= Bangudae Petroglyphs =

Coordinates: 35.5991°N 129.185°E

UNESCO World Heritage Site
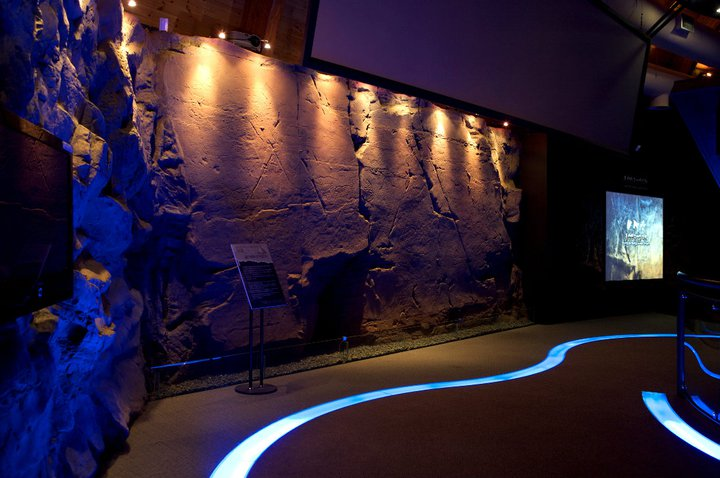
- Bangudae replica
- Interactive map of Bangudae Petroglyphs
- Part of: Petroglyphs along the Bangucheon Stream
- Criteria: Cultural: i, iii
- Reference: 1740
- Inscription: 2025 (47th Session)

Korean name
- Hangul: 반구대 암각화
- Hanja: 盤龜臺 巖刻畫
- RR: Bangudae amgakhwa
- MR: Pan'gudae amgakhwa

The Bangudae (Daegok-ri) Petroglyphs (Korean: 반구대 암각화) are pre-historic engravings on flat vertical rock faces on the riverside of the Daegokcheon (Bangucheon) stream, a branch of the Taehwa River, which runs eastward and joins the East Sea at Ulsan. They are the National Treasure of South Korea No. 285 and were registered on the UNESCO World Heritage List in 2025.

The petroglyps were engraved using stone and metal tools, spanning from 5,000 BCE to the ninth century CE.

The Bangudae rocks are around 8 m wide and around 5 m high. The surrounding ten rock faces have a small number of engravings as well. The name Bangudae comes from the Korean ban (반), the word for a shell, gu (구), meaning a turtle; and dae (대), a structure or a site since the carving site forms itself like the back of turtle.

== Discovery ==
The date of the first discovery dates back to December 24, 1970. The Dongguk University Buddhist investigation team accidentally discovered rocks with geometric patterns such as concentric circles and rhombus in Cheonjeon-ri, Ulju-gun, Ulsan. (Note: Moon Myung-dae(문명대), the first finder at the time and the present-day emeritus professor of Dongguk University said that his team had been working on the Buddhist relic excavations around Ulsan area. The Buddhist-founded university has been the hub of surveying Korean Buddhist art. According to some testimonies of the villagers, he started to scope adjacent cliffs.) The following year, in 1971, about 2 km away from the Cheonjeon-ri petroglyphs, the team also found the Daegok-ri Bangudae petroglyphs in 1971, which was filled with about 300 sea animals, land animals, and hunting figures.

== Geography ==
Major bedrock in the middle stream of Daegok-cheon is a sedimentary rock called the Daegu Formation, which is composed of greenish gray or dark gray sandstone, siltstone, shale, and purple siltstone mixed with mudstone and conglomerates in alternating rock layers.

The rocks consist of shale and hornfels oriented toward the north and they shine for a while at sunset. It is a rare case, in that many of the rock arts occur on south facing, providing visibility. As an overhanging cliff they are in the structure of a rock shelter. It is believed that people congregated around huge rocks to take place several rituals.

== Description ==
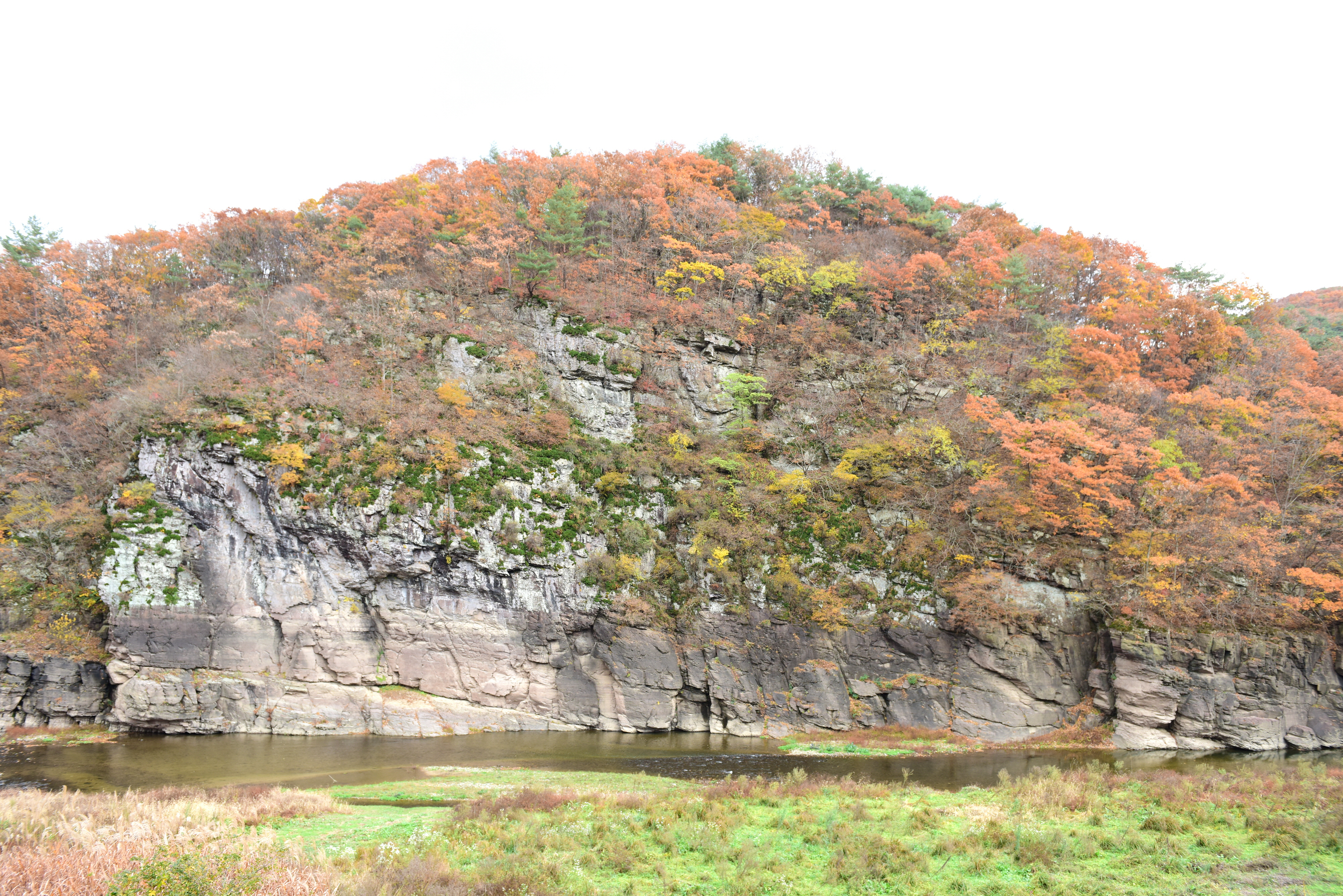
The cliff where the petroglyphs are engraved.

According to the statistical data provided by the Ulsan Petroglyph Museum of Bangudae, 312 petroglyphs are engraved. In total, 312 engravings can be seen, of which 200 figures are accounted for as the animals and 23 are unidentified creatures. Representations of cetaceans are the most frequent, being 28% of the figures. In terms of theme, the representations are either anthropomorphic, depicting the body or face of a human; zoomorphic, showing sea and land animals; or hunting and fishing tools.

The engravings of whales and deer were made in most cases by carving out the body, while those of land animals mostly consist of outlines and patterns drawn on the rock surface, suggesting the differences in the time of production, given the overlapping relationships of the depictions. At the site, cetaceans are most important, followed by deer and land animals in that order, and there are a small number of turtles, deer, seals, fish, and birds. Both sea and land animals are described as being pregnant, referring to the ancient people’s desire for food and fertility. Since these kinds of images are hard to find out around the world, the value the Bangudae site holds is considered to be huge.

=== Human figures ===
The figures are side views of the whole body with a somewhat exaggerated penis or front images of people with mask-like faces spreading their four limbs. There are engravings of people hunting animals with a bow, raising their hands, and playing a long rod like a musical instrument, recalling hunting and religious acts.

The anthropomorphous figures blowing a long stick or showing its masked face is presumed to be a mythical (religious) person. Some are drawn with animals like deer, suggesting that the hunting was done primarily by men.

=== Animal figures ===
Shapes and features enable the species to be discriminated. Most of them are whales and concentrated on the left main rock face. Ungulate mammals like deer and predatory animals like tigers, leopards, and wolves are mainly on the right main rock face. Animals whose species can be identified include large cetaceans such as the northern right whale, the humpback whale, the right whale, the gray whale, and the sperm whale. There are also sea animals such as sea turtles, seals, and salmon-like fish; sea birds; and land animals such as red deer, musk deer, roe deer, water deer, tigers, leopards, wolves, foxes, raccoon dogs, and wild boars.

==== Sea animals ====
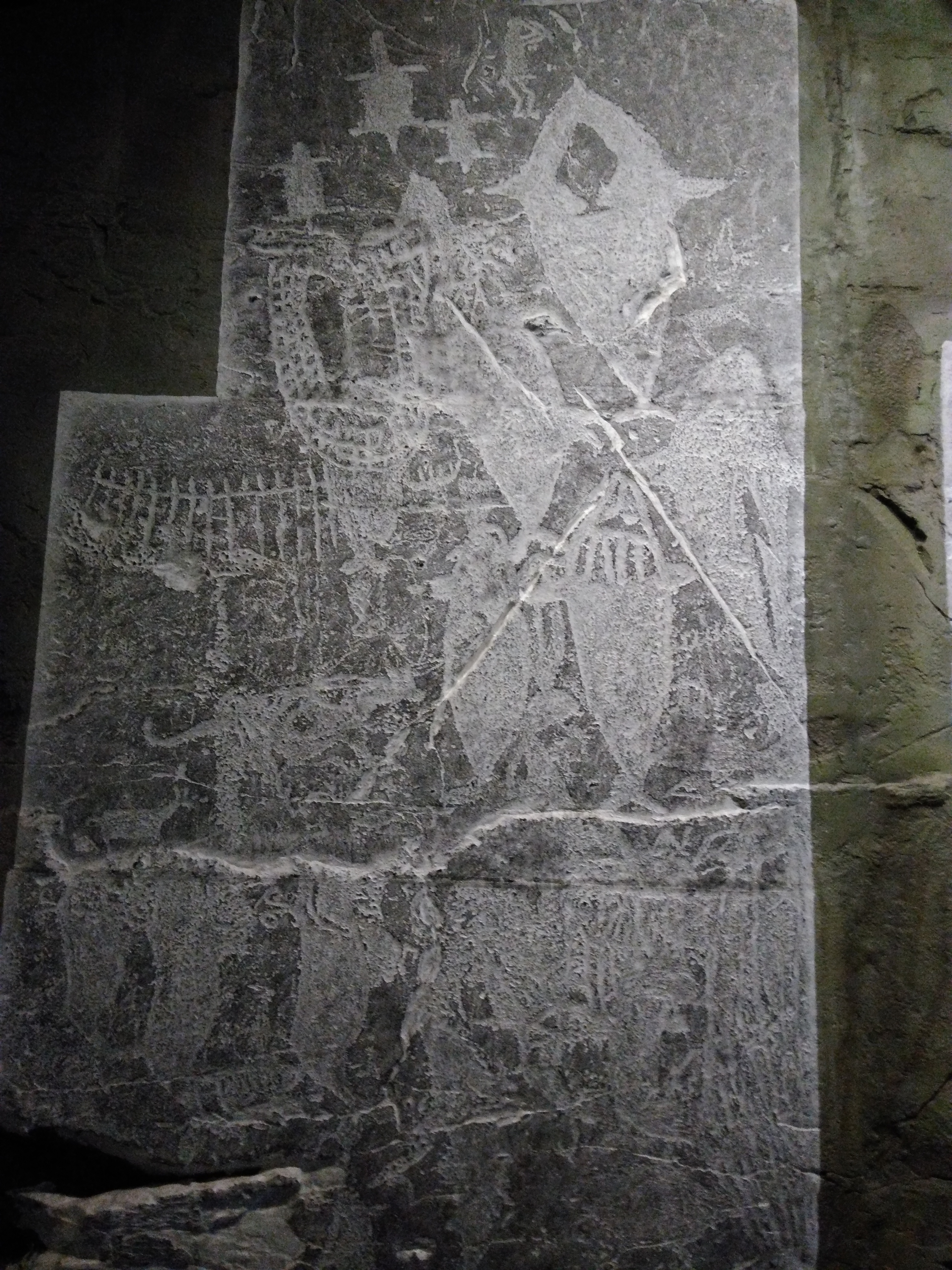
Bangudae Petroglyphs replica in the Gyeongju National Museum

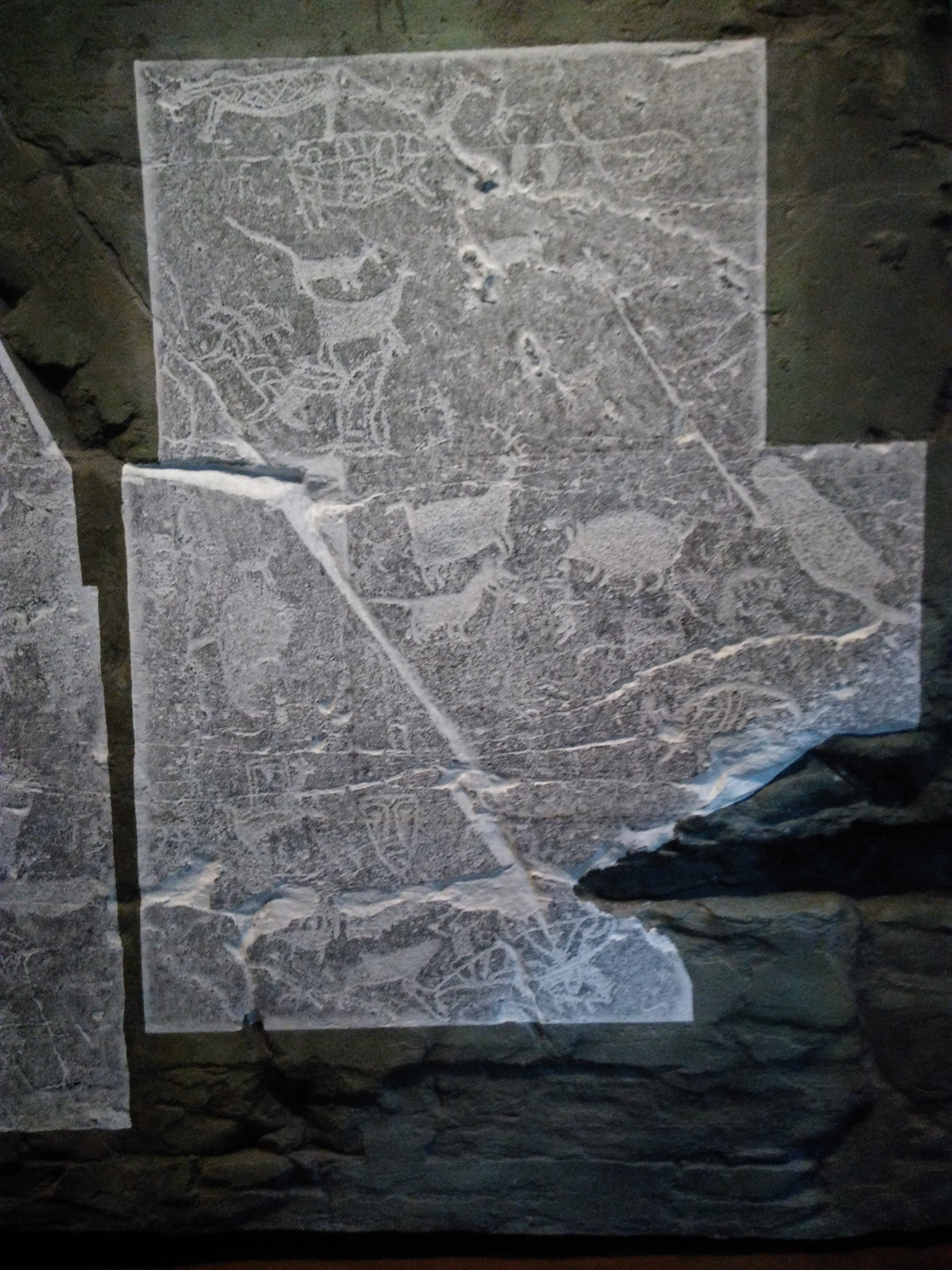
One part of the petroglyph describing a Sperm whale and a group of running deer.

The Bangudae Petroglyphs present a prehistoric catalogue of marine fauna, featuring approximately 70 individual carvings dedicated strictly to ocean animals. Among these aquatic figures, cetaceans form a dominant category, alongside meticulously carved sea turtles, pinnipeds like seals, and various species of large saltwater fish.

Because people in the area once relied on whales for their livelihood, they often treated whales as objects of faith. In Ulsan, a whale shrine still exists. Cetacean figures showcase remarkable anatomical realism, capturing gray whales, humpback whales, sperm whales, and right whales with clear species-specific attributes. For example, the gray whale is depicted as a bit thinner than other whales, having five longitudinal lines on the neck and eyes and mouth. Notably, the petroglyphs depict a mother gray whale carrying a calf on her back, reflecting the species' behavioral ecology where mothers physically support their young to reach the surface for respiration. This demonstrates that Neolithic humans possessed a direct, empirical understanding of marine ecology. The illustration of whales shows their hunting activities in accordance with a bird's-eye view, which makes beholders to feel a better sense of reality.

The three turtles on the upper left of the main rock face appear to be guiding whales swimming in a group. Since sea turtles come to shore to spawn between early spring and summer, ancient myth often regarded them as symbolic animals crossing the boundary between sea and land. In the case of fish, heads of fish looking like sharks are depicted sideways, and there are salmon jumping above the sea surface. Sea birds are mostly described as flocking around the whales, which possibly were catching their prey.

==== Land animals ====
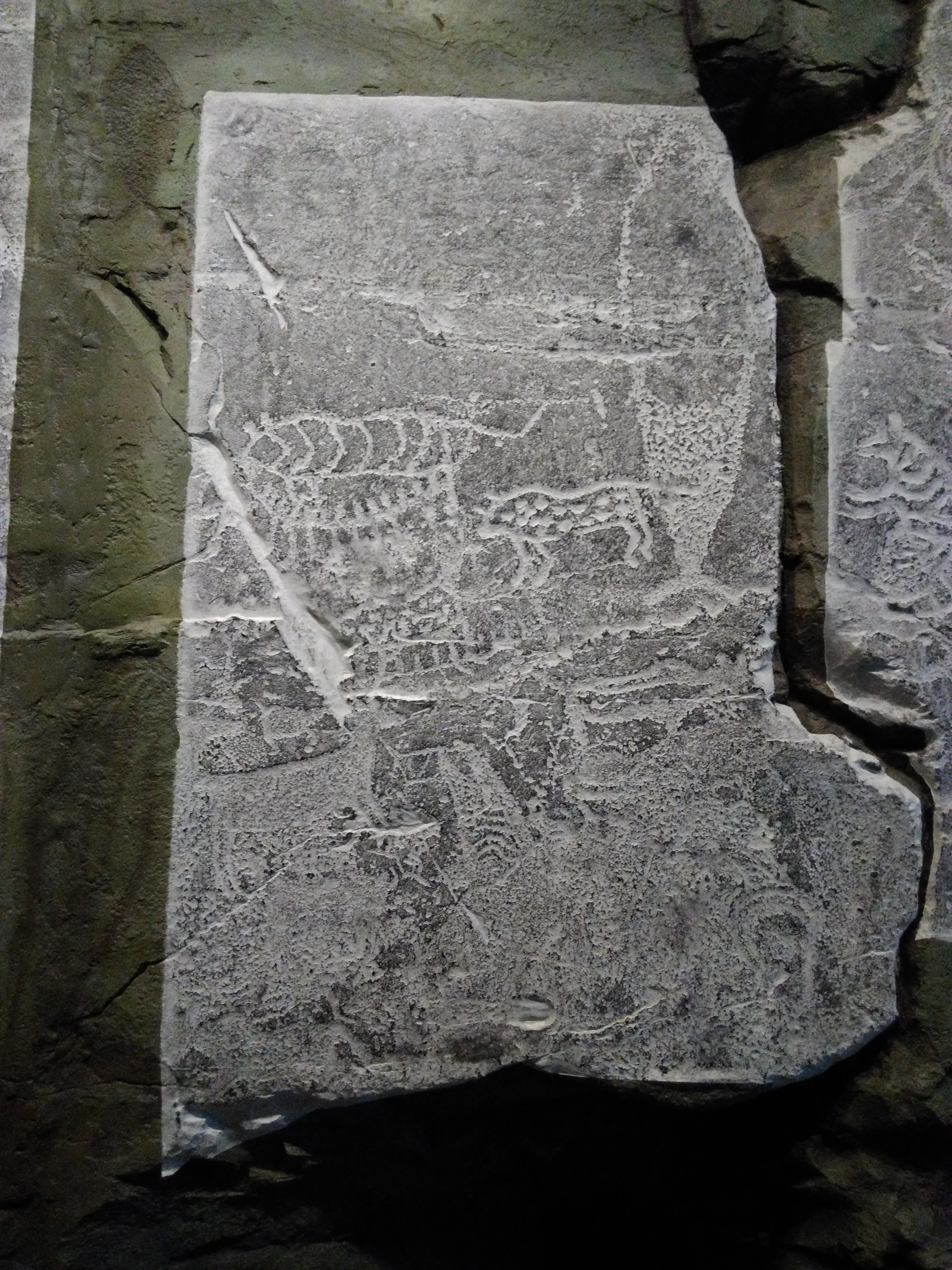
The replica depicting tigers and whales.

Most of the land animals are shown in a side view, which can best express the shape of four-limbed land animals. Some species can be classified according to the shape of body, skin patterns, the length of the tail and legs, and the shoulder line. These include sika deer, red deer, musk deer, roe deer, and water deer, most of which were deeply valued as prey for the hunting. For instance, the roe deer is depicted with a more angular rump compared to other species of deer, and the water deer—an endemic species of the Korean Peninsula—is portrayed with a relatively rounded shape.

Among the felines depicted in the engravings, tigers, leopards, lynxes, and leopard cats can be identified, while the Canidae portrayed include foxes, wolves, raccoon dogs, and dholes. Feline species can be distinguished by their fur colors and patterns. Tigers, for example, have black stripes across their entire bodies, whereas leopards and lynxes are marked with black spots. Cuon alpinus have a short snout and limbs, straight ears, and dropped-down tails, while the raccoons have a short head, a pointed snout and thin legs.

=== Tools ===
Tools relating to hunting and fishing such as boats, floats, harpoons, fishing nets, fish pounds, and bows provide information on the age of the rock art and livelihood of the time. For example, one scene shows people standing in a curved boat connected via a line to a whale. Around 5–17 people are on boats surrounding whales. The bows and sterns are semi-circular and are connected to a harpoon stuck into the body of a whale and to floats hanging on rope. The tools are almost identical to those used by natives for whaling today. This kind of depiction strongly suggests whaling played an important role in social cohesion in the lives of the people, similar to that which has been observed in historic Inuit populations.

This site also has scenes of whales and tigers being captured with a net. As an exceptional scene on rocks in the globe, hunting scenes of both whales in the sea and tigers on the land represent the symbolic meaning of man’s place in prehistoric times.

=== Indeterminate figures ===
Engravings of uncertain theme and content have been classified into two types: those of unknown theme which are in good condition and those of unknown shape which have been worn and damaged over time and are therefore hard to decode. Some have signs with certain patterns, but it is hard to classify them on the basis of engravings on the rock alone. Signs are conceptual expressions that are impossible to find in real life but are repeated expressions of a certain pattern.

== Dating ==
According to the results of an analysis of animal bones discovered in a shell midden in Ulsan and widespread along the southeastern coasts and of research on Ulsan Bay's archaeological environment, the site dates from 6,000 to 1,000 BC., suggesting whaling played an important role in social cohesion in the lives of the people, similar to that which has been observed in historic Inuit populations. Many relics related to the themes of the rock art were found at Neolithic sites, include deer pattern pottery, net pattern pottery and shell mask discovered in the Shell Mound in Dongsam-dong, Busan, a figure with human faces in Osan-ri in Yangyang County, a small clay wild pig excavated from the shell midden on Yokjido island of Tongyeong, the clay figure of a woman in Sinam-ri in Ulsan, and a small clay seal excavated from the shell midden in Sejuk-ri, Ulsan. Furthermore, a boat was excavated from the shell midden in Bibong-ri, Changnyeong County, and during the Hwangseong-dong site excavation research project conducted by the Korea Archaeology and Art History Research Institute a whale bone stuck with a harpoon was found, which empirically proves whaling.

The layers which contain the bones of captured whales date back to 5500 to 4700 BP. Consequently, considering livelihoods in that period, hunting and fishing tools, related relics, and contemporary contents, the rock art seems to have been made between the early and mid-Neolithic era.

From the abundant representations of marine animals, the site seems to be in close relationship with hunter-fishers attributed to the Neolithic era (between 8000 BP and 3500 BP). Consequently, the Bangudae site has the most ancient evidence of whaling worldwide and is considered highly important not only as a first whaling representation but also for understanding prehistoric maritime culture in the northern Pacific area.

== Preservation concerns ==
In 2025, the petroglyphs were designated a World Heritage Site by UNESCO.

The Sayeon Dam, built from 1962 to 1965 and expanded between 1999 and 2002, helps supply Ulsan with drinking water but has caused the rocks on which the petroglyphs are carved to be flooded for about eight months of every year. This periodic flooding raises concerns of erosion and water damage of the rock-art motifs, which are considered to be masterpieces of prehistoric art and an invaluable source of prehistoric information.

As of 2026, a central government-level solution to the relevant issue has been underway. The Ministry of Climate, Energy and Environment has decided to install gates on Sayeon Dam, the "dumb dam."

== Ulsan petroglyph museum ==
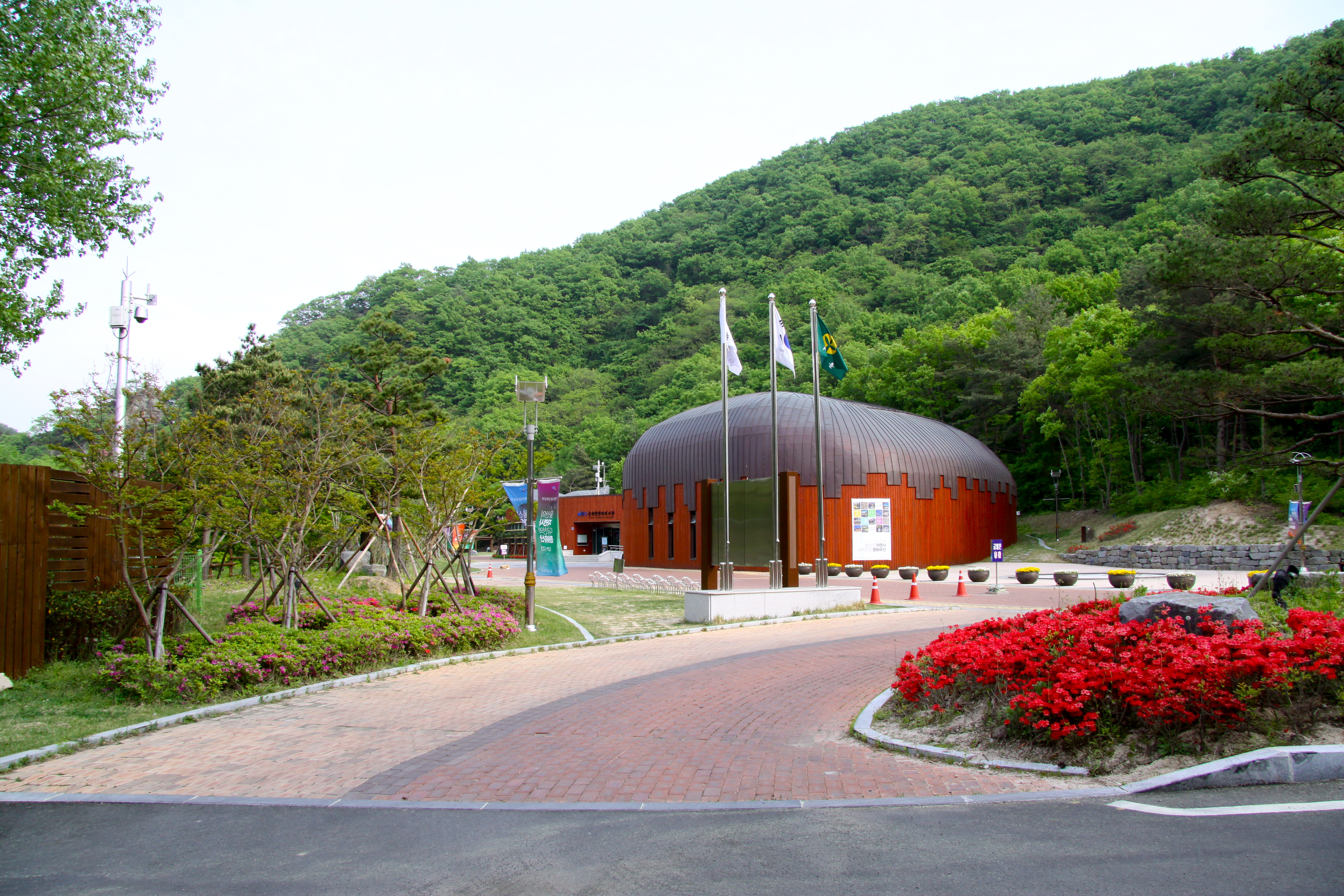
The front view of the museum.

The Ulsan Petroglyph Museum was established in 2008 in order to further introduce the petroglyph in Ulsan and play a crucial role in analyzing petroglyphs in the Korean Peninsula. Built on an 8,960 square meter site, the wooden structure is designed in the shape of a sperm whale, featuring a two-story layout with a total floor area of 2,025 square meters.

Ulsan Metropolitan City is building high-resolution detailed photographs and hyperspectral data. The hyperspectral imaging is a technology that captures and analyzes subtle differences on rock surfaces—difficult for the human eye to distinguish—by photographing them across multiple wavelengths of light. The new center for managing and protecting the world heritage will be completed by 2030.

== Similar sites ==
In evaluating the global importance of the site, ICOMOS compared it to six other rock art locations in East Asia (spread across Russia, Mongolia, Japan, and China). Among these, only the petroglyphs of Sikachi-Alyan and the Tsagaan Salaa rock art reflect a similarly prolonged cultural history. However, they lack the iconographic diversity and density of carvings found in the Bangudae petroglyphs. The fishing and cetacean motifs portrayed near Ulsan are absent in Japan and China, appearing to a comparable degree only in Pegtymel site in Chukotka and the Karelia site in European Russia.

== Miscellaneous ==
- Ulju county office released 10 types of illustrations representing original patterns of Bangudae Petroglyphs, which have been applied to several public areas.
- The Ulsan post office issued special stamps of the prehistoric heritage in July 2026.
- The Ulsan metropolitan government initiated a unique promotion through the domestic snack ‘Goraebab’ (Whale Food) manufactured by the Orion company. The 40 year-old lasting snacks' limited edition has the intention to commemorate the first anniversary of the masterpiece’s UNESCO listing by packaging featured prehistoric whale motifs.

== See also ==
- Prehistoric Korea
- Jeulmun pottery period
- Mumun pottery period
- List of South Korean tourist attractions
- National Treasure (South Korea)

== Sources ==
- Lee, Sangmog (2012). Chasseurs de baleines, la frise du Bangudae. errance. ISBN 9782877724586.
- Kim, Won-yong. Art and Archaeology of Ancient Korea. Taekwang, Seoul, 1986.
- Nelson, Sarah M. The Archaeology of Korea. Cambridge University Press, Cambridge, 1993, pp. 154.
- Lee, Sang-Mog; Robineau, Daniel (January–March 2004). "The cetaceans of the Neolithic rock carvings of Bangu-dae (South Korea) and the beginning of whaling in the North-West Pacific". L'Anthropologie. 108 (1): 137–151. doi:10.1016/j.anthro.2004.01.001.
- Lee, Sang-Mog (July–August 2013). "La vie des chasseurs de baleine coréens gravée sur la pierre, 7000 ans avant notre ère". Dossiers d'Archéologie (in French) (358): 78–81.
- 암각화와 신성한 공간 [The Petroglyph and sacred place]. Ulsan Petroglyph museum. 2021. ISBN 979-11-975744-4-3.
