= Jeulmun pottery period =

Korean historical period

- Geographical range: Korean Peninsula
- Period: Neolithic
- Dates: c. 8000 – c. 1500 BC
- Followed by: Mumun pottery period

Korean name
- Hangul: 즐문 토기 시대
- Hanja: 櫛文 土器 時代
- RR: jeulmun togi sidae
- MR: chŭlmun t'ogi sidae

The Jeulmun pottery period (Korean: 즐문 토기 시대) is an archaeological era in Korean prehistory broadly spanning the period of 8000–1500 BC. This period subsumes the Mesolithic and Neolithic cultural stages in Korea, lasting c. 8000–3500 BC ("Incipient" to "Early" phases) and 3500–1500 BC ("Middle" and "Late" phases), respectively. Because of the early presence of pottery, the entire period has also been subsumed under a broad label of "Korean Neolithic".

The Jeulmun pottery period is named after the decorated pottery vessels that form a large part of the pottery assemblage consistently over the above period, especially 4000–2000 BC. Jeulmun (즐문; 櫛文) means "Comb-patterned". A boom in the archaeological excavations of Jeulmun period sites since the mid-1990s has increased knowledge about this important formative period in the prehistory of East Asia.

The Jeulmun was a period of hunting, gathering, and small-scale cultivation of plants. Archaeologists sometimes refer to this life-style pattern as "broad-spectrum hunting and gathering".

== Incipient Jeulmun ==
The Ubaid culture and contemporary cultures circa 5000 BC

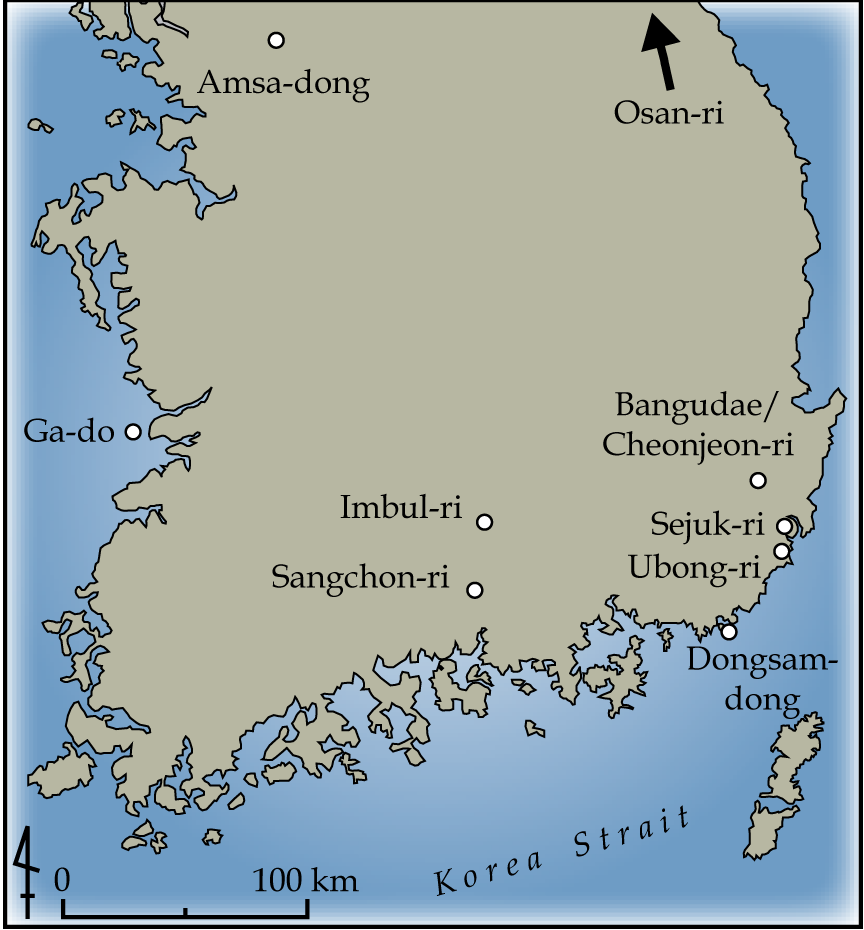
Map of archaeological sites in the southern Korea peninsular during the Jeulmun period

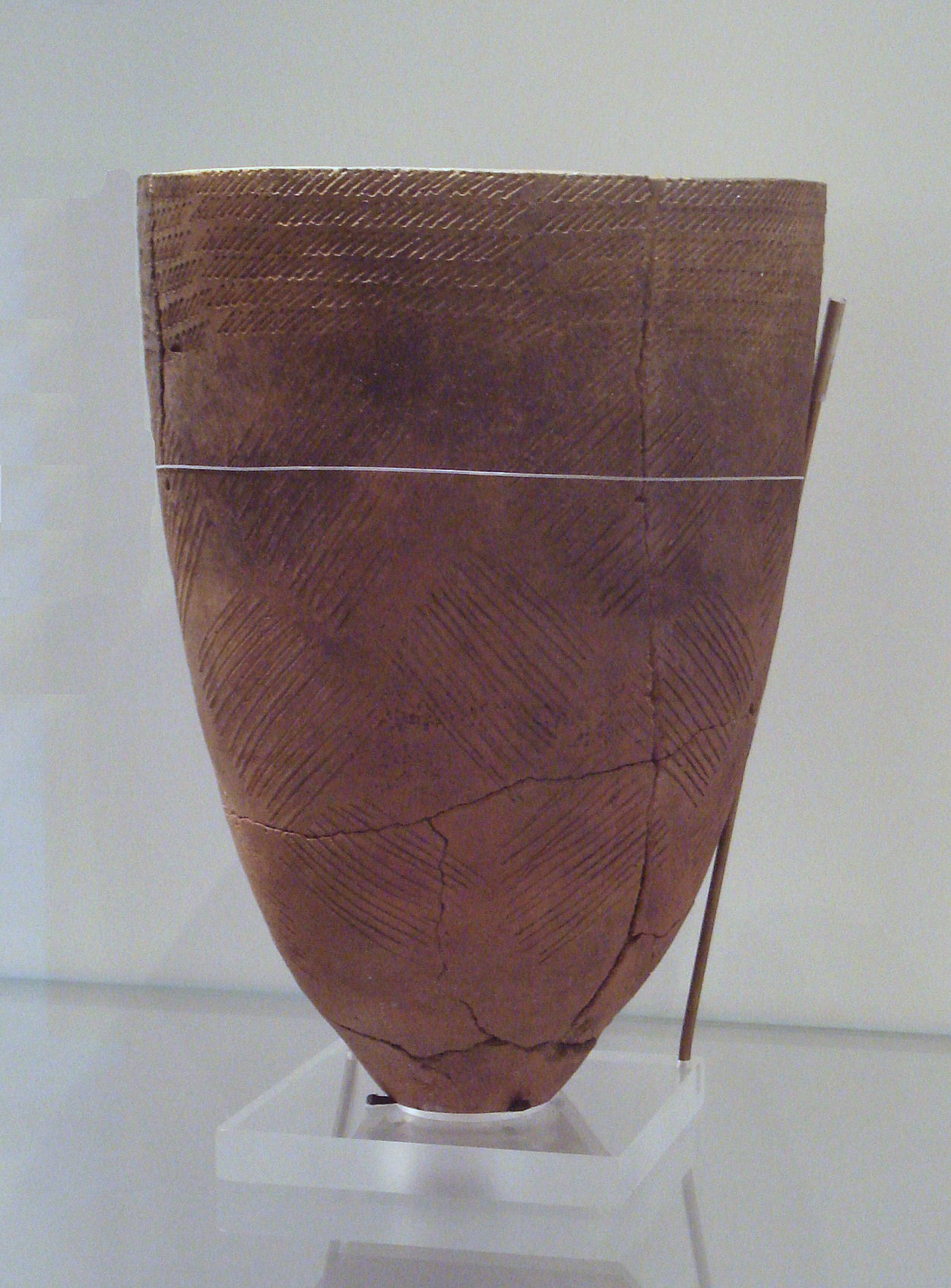
Korean earthenware vessel in the classic Jeulmun comb-pattern style. Various patterns cover the majority of the vessel surface. C. 4000 BC, Amsa-dong, Seoul. British Museum.

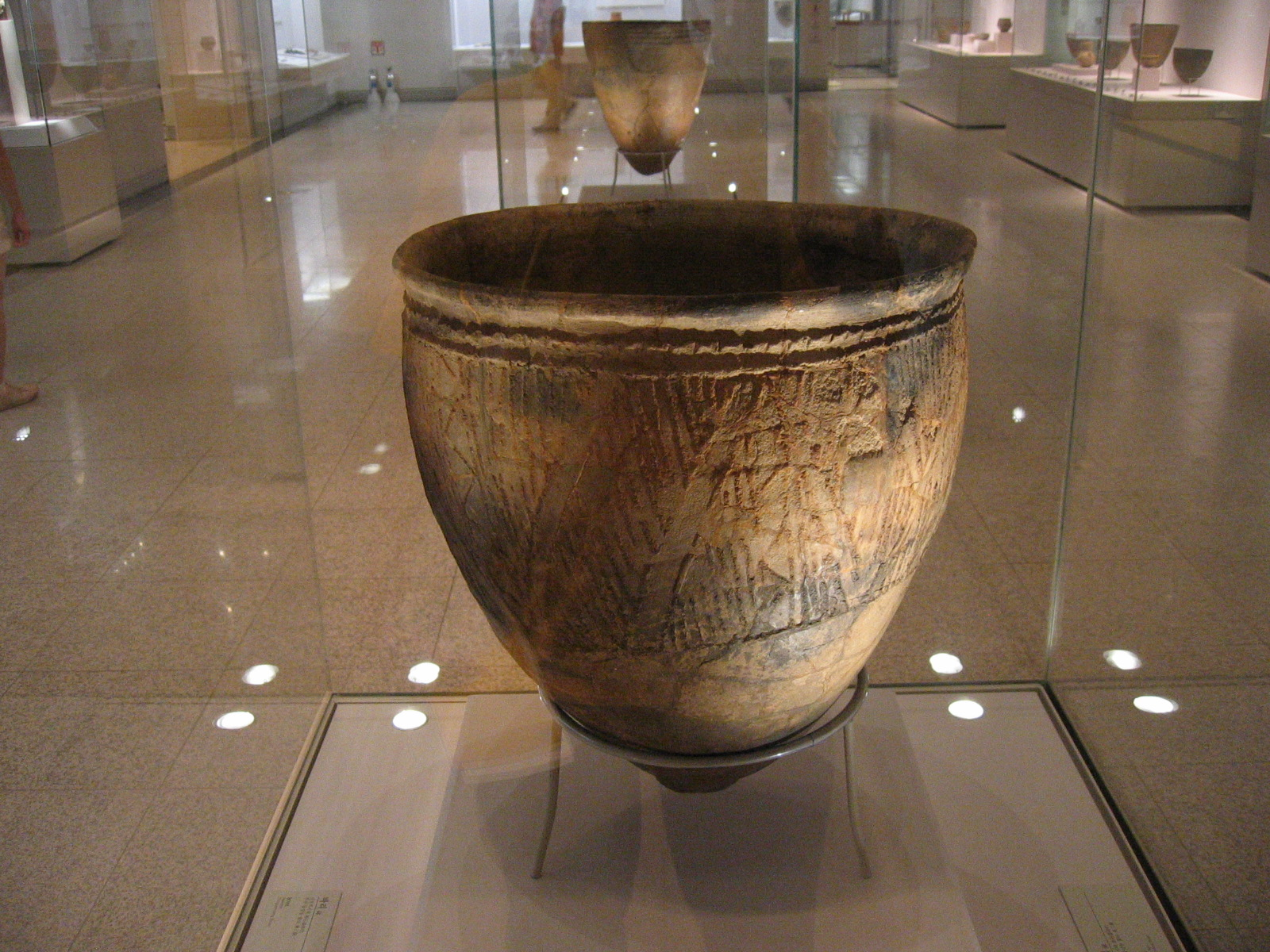
Classic Jeulmun vessel with wide mouth, c. 3500 BC. From National Museum of Korea.

The origins of the Jeulmun are not well known, but raised-clay pattern Yunggimun pottery (융기문토기; 隆起文土器) appears at southern sites such as Gosan-ni in Jeju Province and Ubong-ni on the seacoast in Ulsan. Some archaeologists describe this range of time as the "Incipient Jeulmun period" and suggest that the Gosan-ni pottery dates to 10,000 BC. Samples of the pottery were radiocarbon dated, and although one result is consistent with the argument that pottery emerged at a very early date (i.e., 10,180±65 BP [AA-38105]), other dates are somewhat later. If the earlier dating holds true, Yunggimun pottery from Gosan-ni would be, along with central and southern China, the Japanese archipelago, and the Russian Far East, among a group of the oldest known pottery in world prehistory. Kuzmin suggests that more absolute dating is needed to gain a better perspective on this notion.

== Early Jeulmun ==
The Early Jeulmun period (c. 6000–3500 BC) is characterized by deep-sea fishing, hunting, and small semi-permanent settlements with pit-houses. Examples of Early Jeulmun settlements include Seopohang, Amsa-dong, and Osan-ri. Radiocarbon evidence from coastal shellmidden sites such as Ulsan Sejuk-ri, Dongsam-dong, and Ga-do Island indicates that shellfish were exploited, but many archaeologists maintain that shellmiddens (or shellmound sites) did not appear until the latter Early Jeulmun.

== Middle Jeulmun ==
Choe and Bale estimate that at least 14 Middle Jeulmun period (c. 3500–2000 BC) sites have yielded evidence of cultivation in the form of carbonized plant remains and agricultural stone tools. For example, Crawford and Lee, using AMS dating techniques, directly dated a domesticated foxtail millet (Setaria italica ssp. italica) seed from the Dongsam-dong Shellmidden site to the Middle Jeulmun. Another example of Middle Jeulmun cultivation is found at Jitam-ri (Chitam-ni) in North Korea. A pit-house at Jitam-ri yielded several hundred grams of some carbonized cultigen that North Korean archaeologists state is millet. However, not all archaeologists accept the grains as domesticated millet because it was gathered out of context in an unsystematic way, only black-and-white photos of the find exist, and the original description is in Korean only.

Cultivation was likely a supplement to a subsistence regime that continued to heavily emphasize deep-sea fishing, shellfish gathering, and hunting. "Classic Jeulmun" or Bitsalmunui pottery (빗살무늬토기) in which comb-patterning, cord-wrapping, and other decorations extend across the entire outer surface of the vessel, appeared at the end of the Early Jeulmun and is found in West-central and South-coastal Korea in the Middle Jeulmun.

== Late Jeulmun ==
The subsistence pattern of the Late Jeulmun period (c. 2000–1500 BC) is associated with a de-emphasis on exploitation of shellfish, and the settlement pattern registered the appearance of interior settlements such as Sangchon-ri (see Daepyeong) and Imbul-ri. Lee suggests that environmental stress on shellfish populations and the movement of people into the interior prompted groups to become more reliant on cultivated plants in their diets. The subsistence system of the interior settlements was probably not unlike that of the incipient Early Mumun pottery period (c. 1500–1250 BC), when small-scale shifting cultivation ("slash-and-burn") was practiced in addition to a variety of other subsistence strategies. The Late Jeulmun is roughly contemporaneous with Lower Xiajiadian culture in Liaoning, China. Archaeologists have suggested that Bangudae and Cheonjeon-ri, a substantial group of petroglyph panels in Ulsan, may date to this sub-period, but this is the subject of some debate.

Kim Jangsuk suggests that the hunter-gatherer-cultivators of the Late Jeulmun were gradually displaced from their "resource patches" by a new group with superior slash-and-burn cultivation technology and who migrated south with Mumun or undecorated pottery (무문토기; 無文土器). Kim explains that the pattern of land use practiced by the Mumun pottery users, the dividing up of land into sets of slash-and-burn fields, eventually encroached on and cut off parts of hunting grounds used by Jeulmun pottery users.

== See also ==
- Prehistory of Korea
- List of archaeological periods
- Jōmon pottery
- Pit-Comb Ware culture
