= Prehistoric Korea =

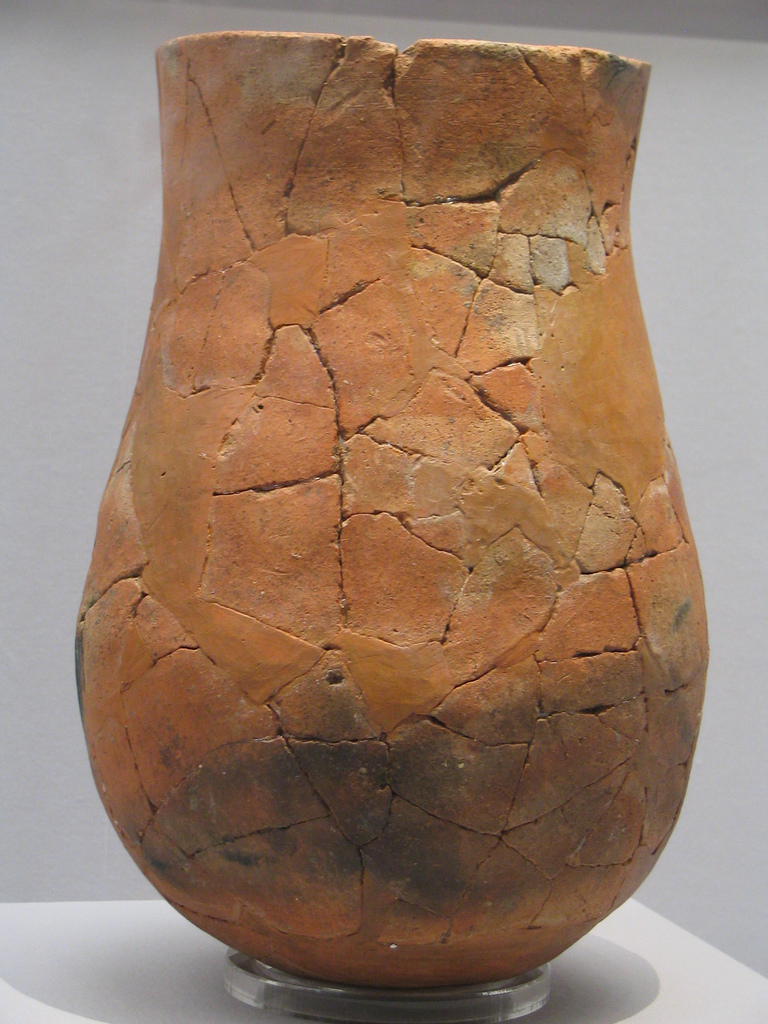
Globular, high-collared jar with slightly flaring rim

Prehistoric Korea is the era of human existence in the Korean Peninsula for which written records do not exist. It nonetheless constitutes the greatest segment of the Korean past and is the major object of study in the disciplines of archaeology, geology, and palaeontology.

== Geological prehistory ==
Geological prehistory is the most ancient part of Korea's past. The oldest rocks in Korea date to the Precambrian. The Yeoncheon System corresponds to the Precambrian and is distributed around Seoul extending out to Yeoncheon-gun in a northeasterly direction. It is divided into upper and lower parts and is composed of biotite-quartz-feldspar schist, marble, lime-silicate, quartzite, graphite schist, mica-quartz-feldspar schist, mica schist, augen gneiss, and garnet-bearing granitic gneiss. The Korean Peninsula had an active geological prehistory through the Mesozoic, when many mountain ranges were formed, and slowly became more stable in the Cenozoic. Major Mesozoic formations include the Gyeongsang Supergroup, a series of geological episodes in which biotite granites, shales, sandstones, conglomerates andesite, basalt, rhyolite, and tuff that were laid down over most of present-day Gyeongsang-do Province.

The remainder of this article describes the human prehistory of the Korean Peninsula.

== Periodization ==
Historians in Korea use the three-age system to classify Korean prehistory. The three-age system was applied during the post-Imperial Japanese occupation period as a way to refute the claims of Imperial Japanese archaeologists who insisted that, unlike Japan, Korea had "no Bronze Age" and because Korea has always had an earlier documented start of civilization than Japan and Bronze Age Korea even influenced the formation of pre-Bronze Age Japan to Iron Age Japan.

- Bissalmuneui or Jeulmun pottery period ("Neolithic") 8000–1500 BC
  - Incipient 8000–6000 BC
  - Early 6000–3500 BC
  - Middle 3500–2000 BC
  - Late 2000–1500/1000 BC
- Mumun pottery period ("Bronze Age") 1500/1000–300 BC
- Samhan / Proto–Three Kingdoms Period ("Iron Age") 100 BC to 300 AD

There are some problems with the three-age system applied to the situation in Korea. This terminology was created to describe prehistoric Europe, where sedentism, pottery and agriculture go together to characterize the Neolithic stage. The periodization scheme used by Korean archaeologists proposes that the Neolithic began in 8000 BC and lasted until 1500 BC. This is despite the fact that palaeoethnobotanical studies indicate that the first bona fide cultivation did not begin until circa 3500 BC. The period of 8000 to 3500 BC corresponds to the Mesolithic cultural stage, dominated by hunting and gathering of both terrestrial and marine resources.

Korean archaeologists traditionally (until the 1990s) used a date of 1500 or 1000 BC as the beginning of the Bronze Age. This is in spite of bronze technology not being adopted in the southern portion of the Korean Peninsula until circa 700 BC, and the archaeological record indicates that bronze objects were not used in relatively large numbers until after 400 BC.

This does leave Korea with a proper Bronze Age, albeit a relatively short one, as bronze metallurgy began to be replaced by ferrous metallurgy soon after it had become widespread.

== Paleolithic ==
Map of Paleolithic sites of the Korean peninsula (clickable map)

The origins of this period are an open question but the antiquity of hominid occupation in Korea may date to as early as 500,000 BC. Yi and Clark are somewhat skeptical of dating the earliest occupation to the Lower Palaeolithic.

At Seokjang-ri, an archaeological site near Gongju, Chungcheongnam-do Province, artifacts that appear to have an affinity with Lower Paleolithic stone tools were unearthed in the lower levels of the site. Bifacial chopper or chopping-tools were also excavated. Hand axes and cleavers produced by individuals in later eras were also uncovered.

From Jeommal Cave a tool, possibly for hunting, made from the radius of a hominid was unearthed, along with hunting and food preparation tools of animal bones. The shells of nuts collected for nourishment were also uncovered.

In Seokjang-ri and in other riverine sites, stone tools were found with definite traces of Palaeolithic tradition, made of fine-grain rocks such as quartzite, porphyry, obsidian, chert, and felsite manifest Acheulian, Mousteroid, and Levalloisian characteristics. Those of the chopper tradition are simpler in shape and chipped from quartz and pegmatite. Seokjang-ri's middle layers showed that humans hunted with these bola or missile stones.

During the Middle Paleolithic Period, humans dwelt in caves at the Jeommal Site near Jecheon and at the Durubong Site near Cheongju. From these two cave sites, fossil remains of rhinoceros, cave bear, brown bear, hyena and numerous deer (Pseudaxi gray var.), all extinct species, were excavated.

The earliest radiocarbon dating for the Paleolithic human fossils from the Gunang Cave based on deer bones from the same layer suggests that human occupation on the southern Korean peninsula began between 40,900 and 44,900 calibrated years Before Present. From an interesting habitation site at Locality 1 at Seokjang-ri, excavators claim that they excavated some human hairs of Mongoloid origin along with limonitic and manganese pigments near and around a hearth, as well as animal figurines such as a dog, tortoise and bear made of rock. Reports claim that these were carbon dated to some 20,000 years ago.

A distinctive technology of the Korean later Palaeolithic is a type of flaked stone tool known as stemmed points. Korean foragers used stemmed points for hunting in more challenging environments as local temperatures gradually decreased during the introduction of stemmed points. Stemmed point use was associated with more residential and less mobile behaviors and the appearance of stemmed points was probably not related to population dynamics.

The Palaeolithic ended when pottery production began c. 8000 BC.

== Jeulmun pottery period ==
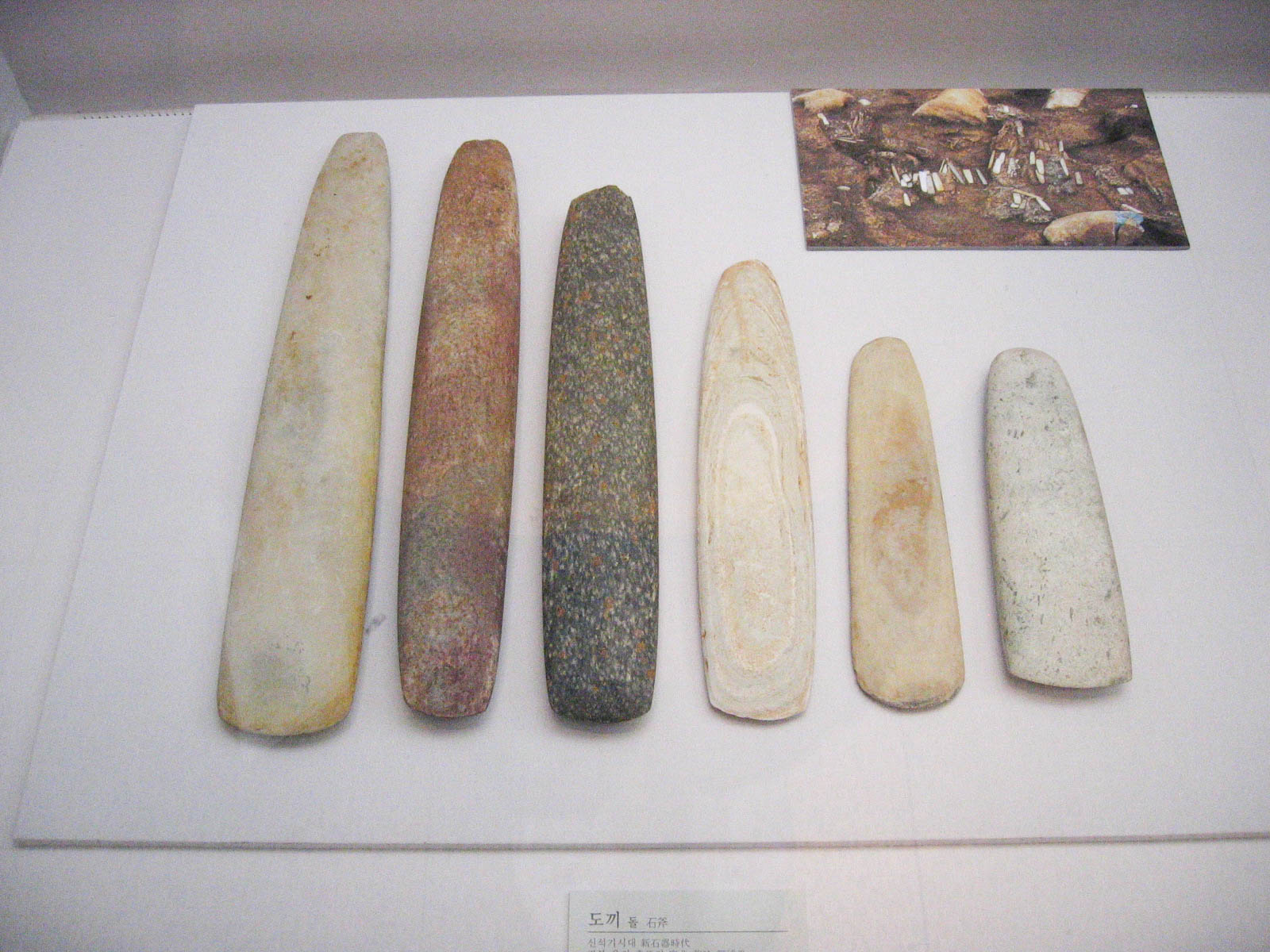
Korea Mesolithic age axes

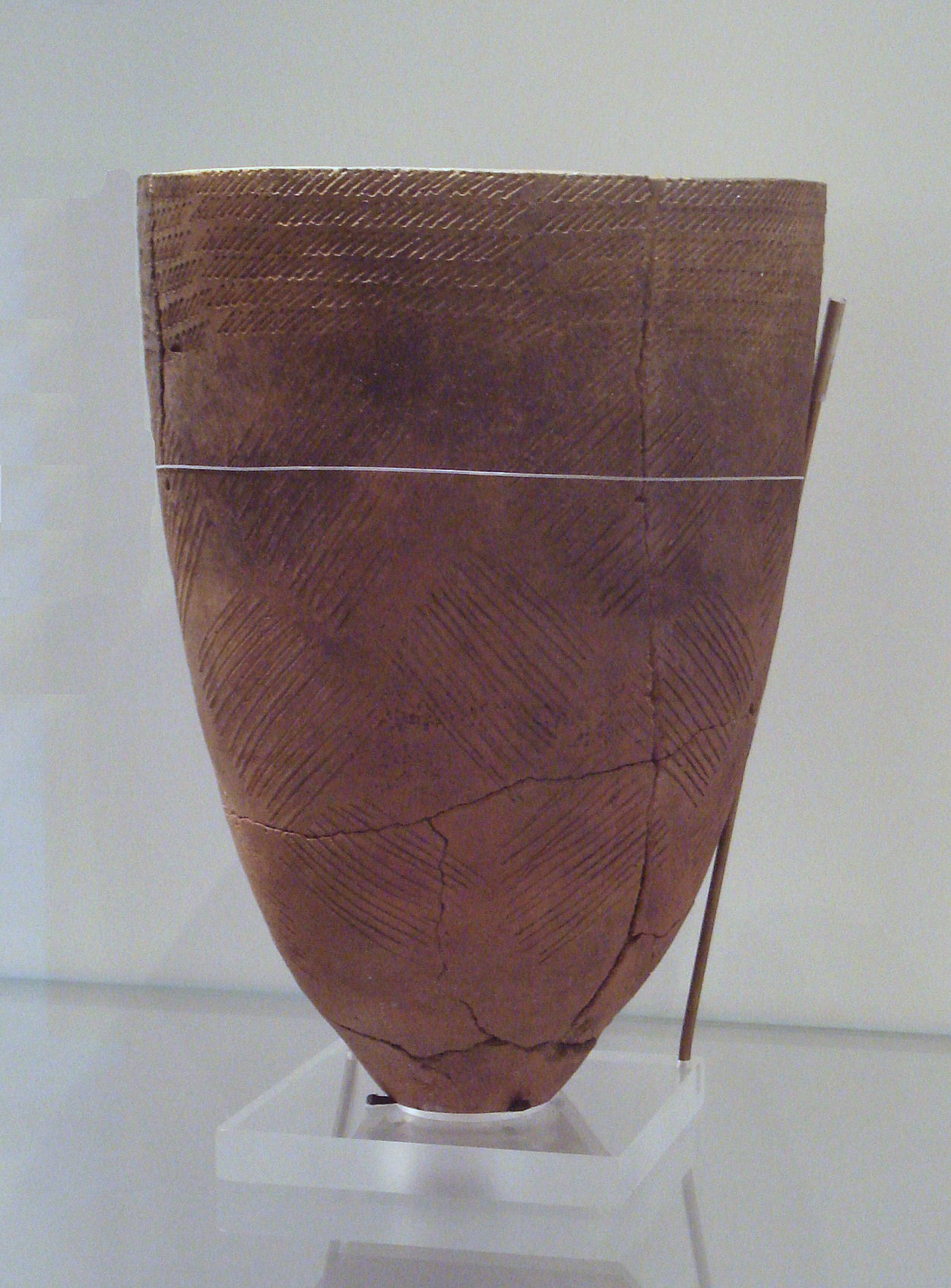
Korean earthenware vessel in the classic Jeulmun comb-pattern style over the whole vessel. c. 4000 BC, Amsa-dong, Seoul. British Museum

The earliest known Korean pottery dates back to c. 8000 BC or before. This pottery is known as Yunggimun pottery (ko:융기문토기) is found in much of the peninsula. Some examples of Yunggimun-era sites are Gosan-ri in Jeju Province and Ubong-ri in Greater Ulsan. Jeulmun or Comb-pattern pottery (즐문토기) is found after 7000 BC, and pottery with comb-patterns over the whole vessel is found concentrated at sites in west–central Korea between 3500 and 2000 BC, a time when a number of settlements such as Amsa-dong and Chitam-ni existed. Jeulmun pottery bears basic design and form similarities to that of the Russian Maritime Province, Mongolia, the Amur and Sungari River basins of Manchuria, the Baiyue of southeastern China and the Jōmon culture in Japan.

The people of the Jeulmun practiced a broad spectrum economy of hunting, gathering, foraging, and small-scale cultivation of wild plants. It was during the Jeulmun that the cultivation of millet and rice was introduced to the Korean peninsula from the Asian continent.

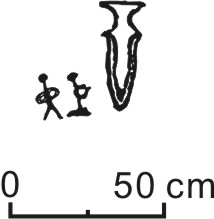
Representations of a dagger (right)and two human figures, one of which is kneeling (left), carved into the capstone of Megalithic Burial No. 5, Orim-dong, Yeosu, Korea

== Mumun Pottery Period ==
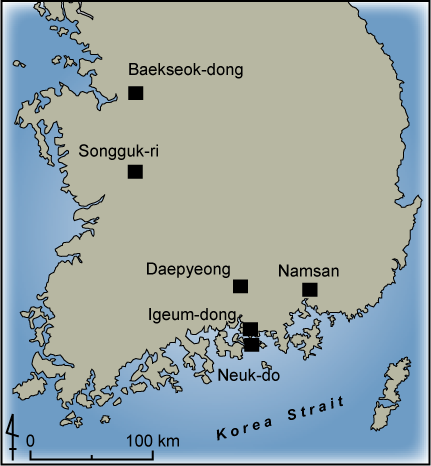
Settlement sites of the Mumun period

Agricultural societies and the earliest forms of social-political complexity emerged in the Mumun pottery period (c 1500–300 BC). People in southern Korea adopted intensive dry-field and paddy-field agriculture with a multitude of crops in the Early Mumun Period (1500–850 BC). The first societies led by chiefs emerged in the Middle Mumun (850–550 BC), and the first ostentatious elite burials can be traced to the Late Mumun (c 550–300 BC). Bronze production began in the Middle Mumun and became increasingly important in Mumun ceremonial and political society after 700 BC. The Mumun is the first time that villages rose, became large, and then fell: some important examples include Songgung-ni, Daepyeong, and Igeum-dong. The increasing presence of long-distance exchange, an increase in local conflicts, and the introduction of bronze and iron metallurgy are trends denoting the end of the Mumun around 300 BC.

The Bronze Age reaches Korea beginning about 800 BC, via Chinese transmission. Bronze metallurgy does not become widespread until the 4th century BC and soon gives way to the transition to ferrous metallurgy, complete by about the 1st century BC.

== Iron Age ==
The transition from the Late Bronze to Early Iron Age in Korea begins in the 4th century BC. This corresponds to the later stage of Gojoseon, the Jin state period in the south, and the Proto–Three Kingdoms period of the 1st to 4th century AD.

The period that begins after 300 BC can be described as 'protohistoric', a time when some documentary sources seem to describe societies in the Korean peninsula. The historical polities described in ancient texts such as the Samguk sagi are an example.

The historical period in Korea begins in the late 4th to mid 5th centuries, when as a result of the transmission of Buddhism, the Korean Three Kingdoms modified Chinese writing to produce the earliest records in Old Korean.

== Mythological prehistory ==
Ancient texts such as the Samguk sagi, Samguk yusa, Book of the Later Han, and others have sometimes been used to interpret segments of Korean prehistory. The most well-known version of the founding legend that relates the origins of the Korean ethnicity explains that a mythical "first emperor", Dangun, was born from the child of the creator deity's son and his union with a female bear in human form. Dangun built the first city. A significant amount of historical inquiry in the twentieth century was devoted to the interpretation of the accounts of Gojoseon (2333–108 BC), Gija Joseon (1122–194 BC), Wiman Joseon (194–108 BC), and others mentioned in historical texts.

== See also ==
- Bangudae Petroglyphs
- Dongsam-dong Shell Midden
- Prehistoric Asia
- Hŭngsu Child
