= Northern right whale =

There are two species of northern right whale:

- North Pacific right whale (Eubalaena japonica)
- North Atlantic right whale (Eubalaena glacialis)

== See also ==
- Right whale
- Northern right whale dolphin
