= Mumun pottery period =

Korean historical period

- Geographical range: Korean Peninsula
- Period: Late Stone Age, Bronze Age
- Dates: c. 1500 – c. 300 BC
- Preceded by: Jeulmun pottery period

Korean name
- Hangul: 무문토기시대
- Hanja: 無文土器時代
- RR: Mumun togi sidae
- MR: Mumun t'ogi sidae

The Mumun pottery period is an archaeological era in Korean prehistory that dates to approximately 1500–300 BC. This period is named after the Korean name for undecorated or plain cooking and storage vessels that form a large part of the pottery assemblage over the entire length of the period, but especially 850–550 BC.

The Mumun period is known for the origins of intensive agriculture and complex societies on both the Korean Peninsula and the Japanese archipelago. This period or parts of it have sometimes been labelled as the "Korean Bronze Age", after Thomsen's 19th century three-age system classification of human prehistory. However, the application of such terminology in the Korean case may be misleading since local bronze production is not proven to have occurred until approximately the 13th century BCE, early bronze artifacts are rare, and the distribution of bronze is highly regionalized until after 300 BC. A boom in the archaeological excavations of Mumun Period sites since the mid-1990s has recently increased collective knowledge about this formative period in the prehistory of East Asia.

The Mumun period is preceded by the Jeulmun pottery period (c. 8000–1500 BC). The Jeulmun was a period of hunting, gathering, and small-scale cultivation of plants. The origins of the Mumun Period are not well known, but the megalithic burials, Mumun pottery, and large settlements found in the Liao River Basin and North Korea c. 1800–1500 probably indicate the origins of the Mumun Period of Southern Korea. Slash-and-burn cultivators who used Mumun pottery displaced people using Jeulmun period subsistence patterns.

== Chronology ==
=== Early Mumun ===
The Early (or Formative) Mumun (c. 1500–850 BC) is characterized by shifting cultivation, fishing, hunting, and discrete settlements with rectangular semi-subterranean pit-houses. The social scale of Early Mumun societies was egalitarian in nature, but the latter part of this period is characterized by increasing intra-settlement competition and perhaps the presence of part-time "big-man" leadership. Early Mumun settlements are relatively concentrated in the river valleys formed by tributaries of the Geum River in West-central Korea. However, one of the largest Early Mumun settlements, Eoeun (Hangeul: 어은), is located in the Middle Nam River valley in South-central Korea. In the latter Early Mumun, large settlements composed of many long-houses such as Baekseok-dong (Hangeul: 백석동) appeared in the area of modern Cheonan City, Chungcheong Nam-do.

Important long-term traditions related to Mumun ceremonial and mortuary systems originated in this sub-period. These traditions include the construction of megalithic burials, the production of red-burnished pottery, and production of polished groundstone daggers.

In Early Mumun, rice agriculture appears (in addition to the earlier millet farming) alongside stone harvesting knives (in particular lunate and bay shaped).

=== Middle Mumun ===
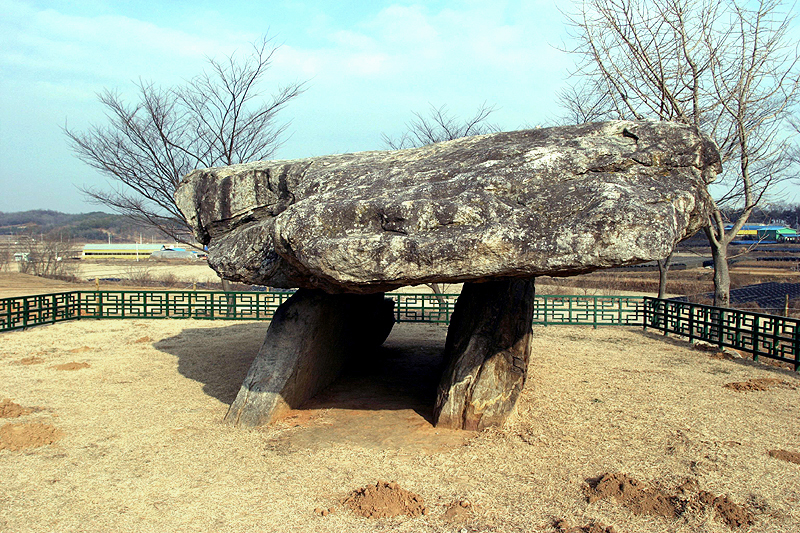
Ganghwa dolmen, South Korea

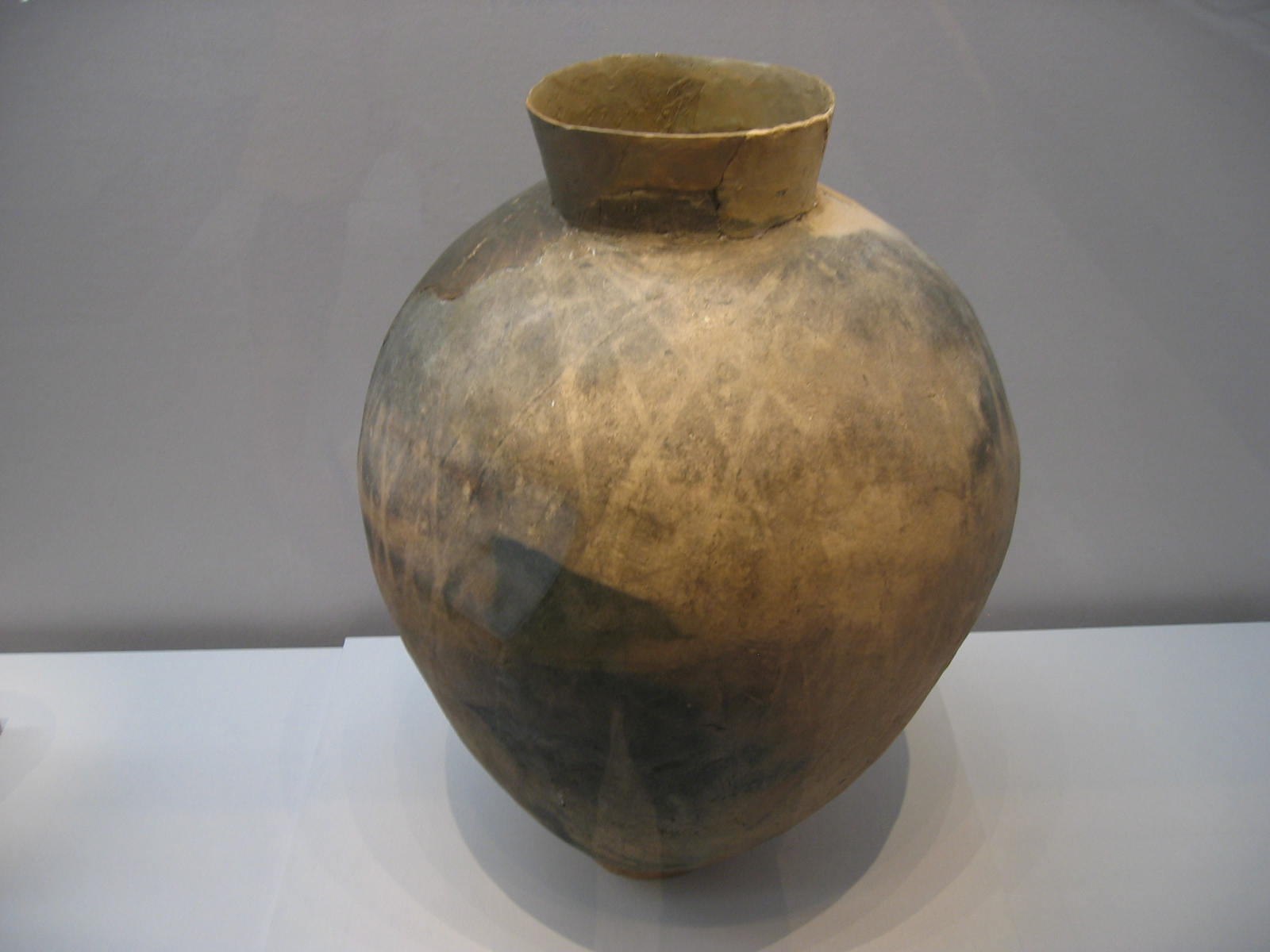
Large Middle Mumun (c. 8th century BC) storage vessel unearthed from a pit-house in or near Daepyeong, H= c. 60–70 cm.

The Middle (or Classic) Mumun (c. 850–550 BC) is characterized by intensive agriculture, as evidenced by the large and expansive dry-field remains (c. 32,500 square metres) recovered at Daepyeong, a sprawling settlement with several multiple ditch enclosures, hundreds of pit-houses, specialized production, and evidence of the presence of incipient elites and social competition. A number of wet-field features have been excavated in southern Korea, indicating that paddy field rice-farming was also practiced.

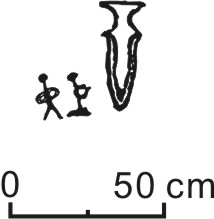
Representations of a dagger (right)and two human figures, one of which is kneeling (left), carved into the capstone of Megalithic Burial No. 5, Orim-dong, Yeosu, Korea.

Burials dating to the latter part of the Middle Mumun (c. 700–550 BC) contain a few high status mortuary offerings such as bronze artifacts. Bronze production probably began around this time in Southern Korea. Other high status burials contain greenstone (or jade) ornaments. A number of megalithic burials with deep shaft interments, substantial 'pavements' of rounded cobblestone, and prestige artifacts such as bronze daggers, jade, and red-burnished vessels were built in the vicinity of the southern coast in the Late Middle Mumun. High status megalithic burials and large raised-floor buildings at the Deokcheon-ni (Hangeul: 덕천리) and Igeum-dong sites in Gyeongsang Nam-do provide further evidence of the growth of social inequality and the existence of polities that were organized in ways that appear to be similar to simple "chiefdoms".

Korean archaeologists sometimes refer to Middle Mumun culture as Songguk-ri Culture (Hanja: 松菊里 文化; Hangeul: 송국리 문화). Co-occurring artifacts and features that are grouped together as Songguk-ri Culture are found in settlement sites in the Hoseo and Honam regions of southeast Korea, but Songguk-ri Culture settlements are also found in western Yeongnam. Excavations have also revealed Songguk-ri settlements in the Ulsan and Gimhae areas. In 2005 archaeologists uncovered Songguk-ri Culture pit-houses at a site deep in the interior of Gangwon Province. The ultimate geographic reach of Songguk-ri Culture appears to have been Jeju Island and western Japan.

Mumun culture is the beginning of a long-term tradition of rice-farming in Korea that links Mumun culture with the present day, but evidence from the Early and Middle Mumun suggests that, although rice was grown, it was not the dominant crop. During the Mumun people grew millets, barley, wheat, legumes, and continued to hunt and fish.

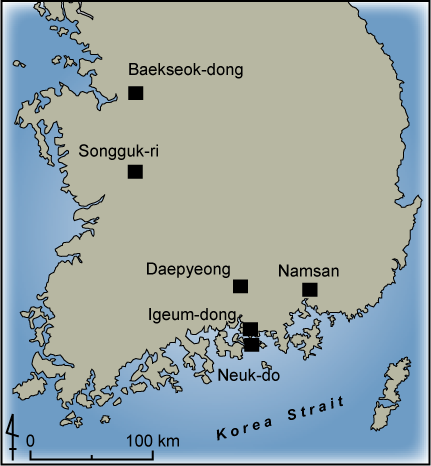
Settlement sites of the Mumun Period that are mentioned in the text of this article.

=== Late Mumun ===
The Late (or Post-classic) Mumun (550–300 BC) is characterized by increasing conflict, fortified hilltop settlements, and a concentration of population in the southern coastal area. A Late Mumun occupation was found at the Namsan settlement, located on the top of a hill 100 m above sea level in modern Changwon City, Gyeongsang Nam-do. A shellmidden (shellmound) was found in the vicinity of Namsan, indicating that, in addition to agriculture, shellfish exploitation was part of the Late Mumun subsistence system in some areas. Pit-houses at Namsan were located inside a ring-ditch that is some 4.2 m deep and 10 m in width. The purpose of this massive ring-ditch may be related to intergroup conflict. Archaeologists propose that the Late Mumun was a period of conflict between groups of people.

The number of settlements in the Late Mumun is much lower than in the previous sub-period. This indicates that populations were reorganized and settlement was probably more concentrated in a smaller number of larger settlements. There are a number of reasons why this could have occurred. There are some indications that conflict increased or climatic change led to crop failures.

According to the traditional Yayoi chronological sequence, Mumun-esque settlements appeared in Northern Kyūshū (Japan) during the Late Mumun. The Mumun period ends when iron appeared in the archaeological record along with pit-houses that had interior composite hearth-ovens reminiscent of the historic period (agungi).

Some scholars suggest that the Mumun pottery period should be extended to c. 0 BC because of the presence of an undecorated ware that was popular between 400 BC and 0 BC called jeomtodae (Korean: 점토대). However, bronze became very important in ceremonial and elite life from 300 BC. Additionally, iron tools are increasingly found in Southern Korea after 300 BC. These factors clearly differentiate the time period 300 BC – 0 from the cultural, technological, and social scale that was present in the Mumun pottery period. The unequal presence of bronze and iron in increased amounts from a few high status graves after 300 BC as sets this time apart from the Mumun pottery period. Thus, the Mumun is described as ending, as a cultural-technical period, by approximately 300 BC.

From about 300 BC, bronze objects became the most valued prestige mortuary goods, but iron objects were traded and then produced in the Korean Peninsula at that time. The Late Mumun-Early Iron Age Neuk-do Island Shellmidden Site yielded a small number of iron objects, Lelang and Yayoi pottery, and other evidence showing that beginning in the Late Mumun, local societies were drawn into closer economic and political contact with the societies of the Late Zhou dynasty, Final Jōmon, and Early Yayoi.

== Mumun cultural traits ==
As an archaeological culture, the Mumun is composed of the following elements:

=== Languages ===
According to Juha Janhunen and Alexander Vovin, Japonic languages were spoken in parts of the Korean Peninsula before they were replaced by Koreanic speakers. According to Whitman and several other researchers, Japonic/proto-Japonic arrived in the Korean peninsula around 1500 BC and was brought to the Japanese archipelago by Yayoi wet-rice farmers at some time between 700–300 BC. Whitman and Miyamoto associate Japonic as the language family associated with both Mumun and Yayoi cultures. Mumun-related populations also likely adopted proto-Japonic languages from populations associated with the Gonggwiri type pottery in the northern Korean Peninsula, who in turn arrived in Korea from the Pianpu Culture of the eastern Liaoxi district or Liaohe basin in southern Manchuria at around 2700 BC. Several linguists believe that speakers of Koreanic/proto-Koreanic arrived in the Korean Peninsula at some time after the Japonic/proto-Japonic speakers and coexisted with these peoples (i.e. the descendants of both the Mumun and Yayoi cultures) and possibly assimilated them. Both Koreanic and Japonic had prolonged influence on each other and a later founder effect diminished the internal variety of both language families.

=== Subsistence ===
- Broad-spectrum subsistence was practiced through the Early Mumun. Evidence excavated from pit-houses and other outdoor household features indicates that hunting, fishing, and foraging was occurring in addition to agriculture.
- Stone tools used in agricultural subsistence activities are common and include semi-lunar blades.
- Intensive wet-field agriculture (paddy farming) was in place in the Middle Mumun. However, even the pit-houses of settlements associated with wet-field archaeological features show evidence that people were also engaged to some degree in hunting and fishing.

=== Settlement ===
- Large rectangular-shaped pit-houses were used in Early Mumun. These pit-houses had one or more hearths, and pit-houses with up to 6 hearths indicate that such features were the living spaces for multiple generations of the same household.
- Some time after 900 BC, small pit-houses were the norm. The plan-shape of these pit-houses are square, circular and oval. They do not have interior hearths—instead, the central area of the pit-house floor is equipped with a shallow oval 'work-pit'.
- Archaeologists see this change in architecture as a social shift in the household. Namely, the tight and multi-generational unit housed under one roof in the Early Mumun changed fundamentally into households formed of groups of semi-independent nuclear family units in separate pit-houses.
- The average settlement in the Mumun was small, but settlements with as many as several hundred pit-houses emerged in the Middle Mumun.

=== Economy ===
- Household production was the basic mode of the Mumun economy, but specialized craft production and a big-man-style redistributive prestige economy emerged in the Middle Mumun.
- Archaeological evidence has documented cases in which it appears that surplus production of crops, stone tools, and pottery occurred in the Middle Mumun.
- Artifacts that illustrate regional redistributive systems and exchange include greenstone ornaments, bronze objects, and some kinds of red-burnished pottery.

=== Mortuary practices ===
- Megalithic burials, stone-cist burials, and jar burials are found.
- Some burials in the latter part of the Middle Mumun are especially large and required a significant amount of labour to construct. A small number of Middle Mumun burials contain prestige/ceremonial artifacts such as bronze, greenstone, groundstone daggers, and red-burnished ware.

== Gallery ==
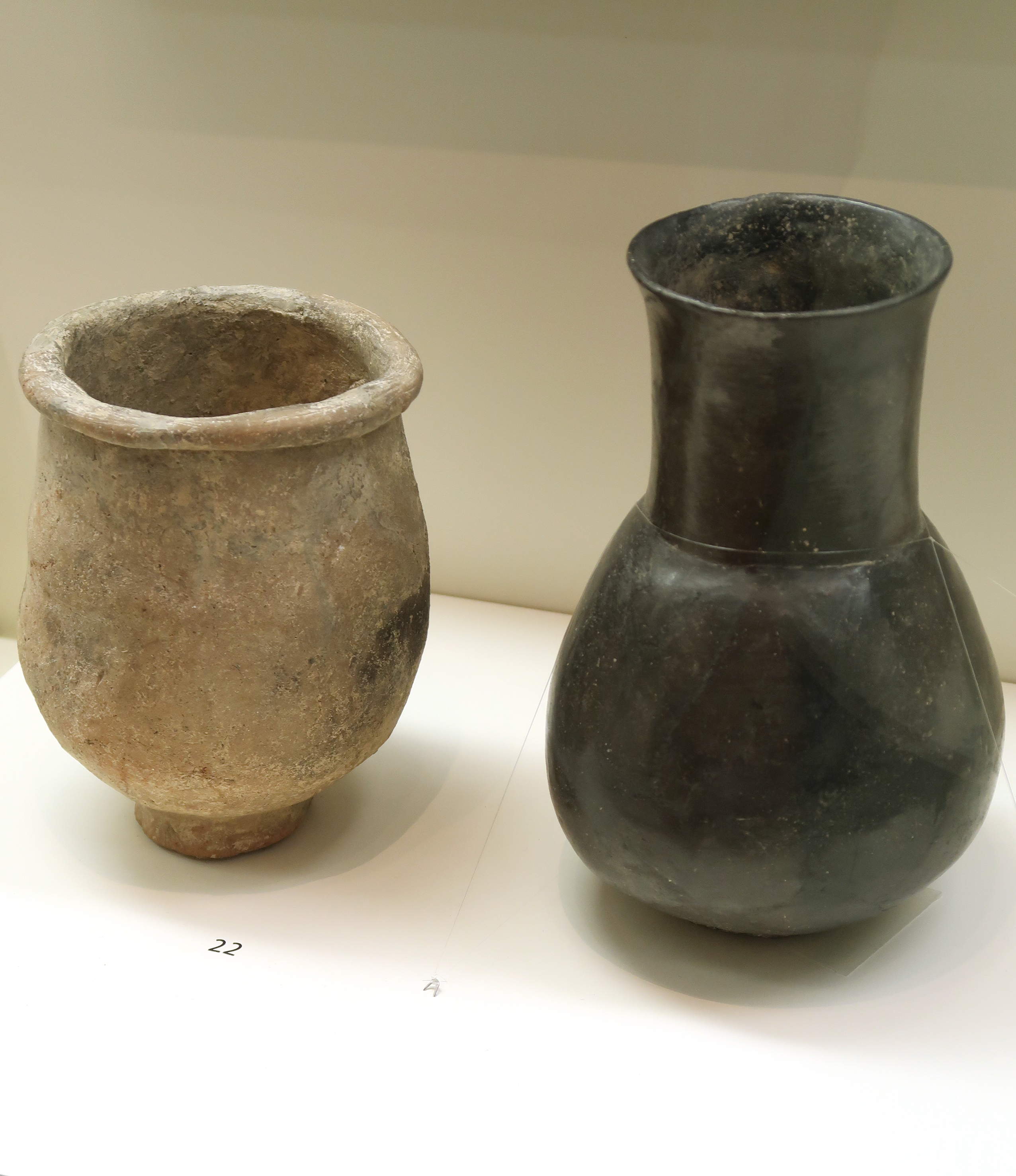

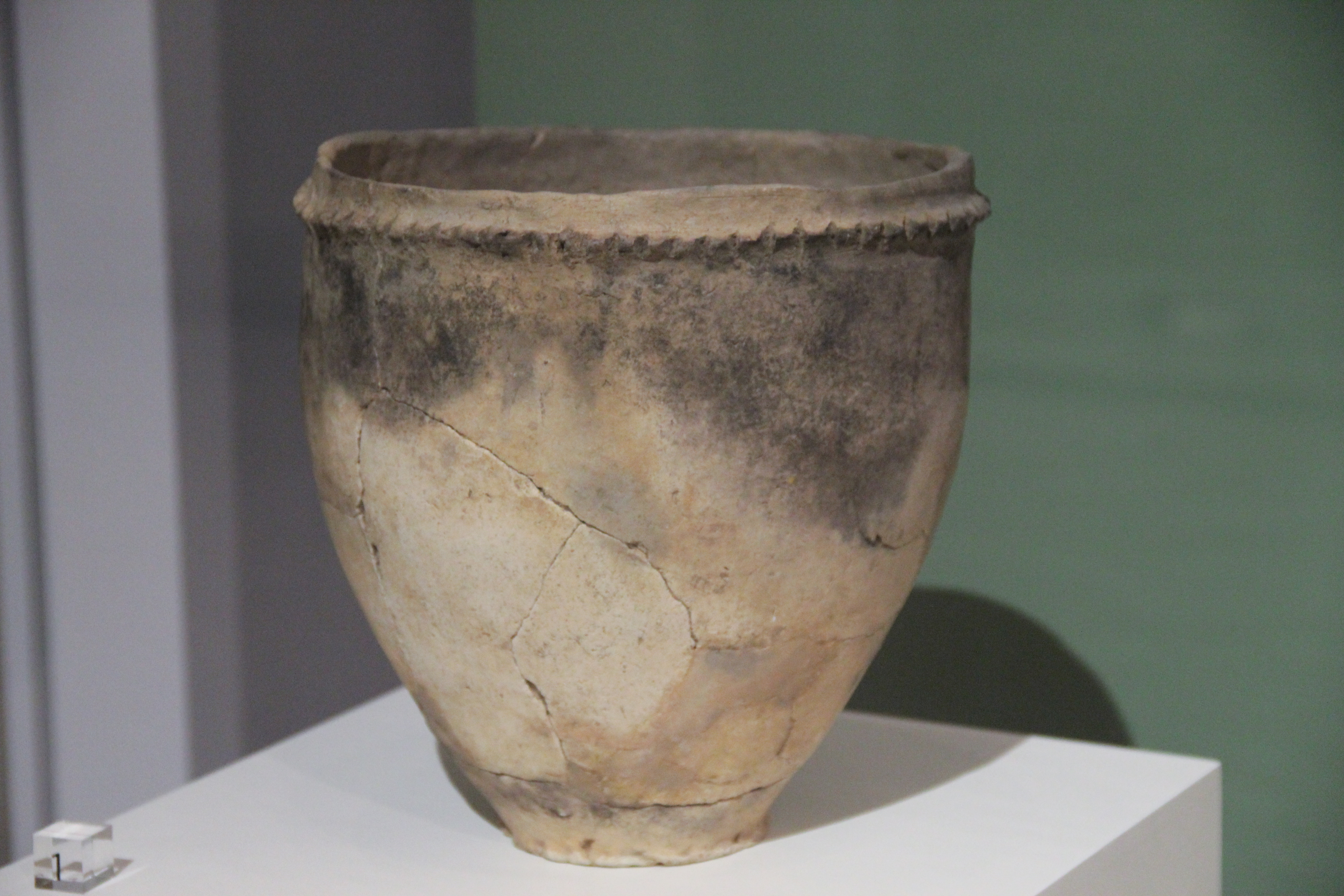

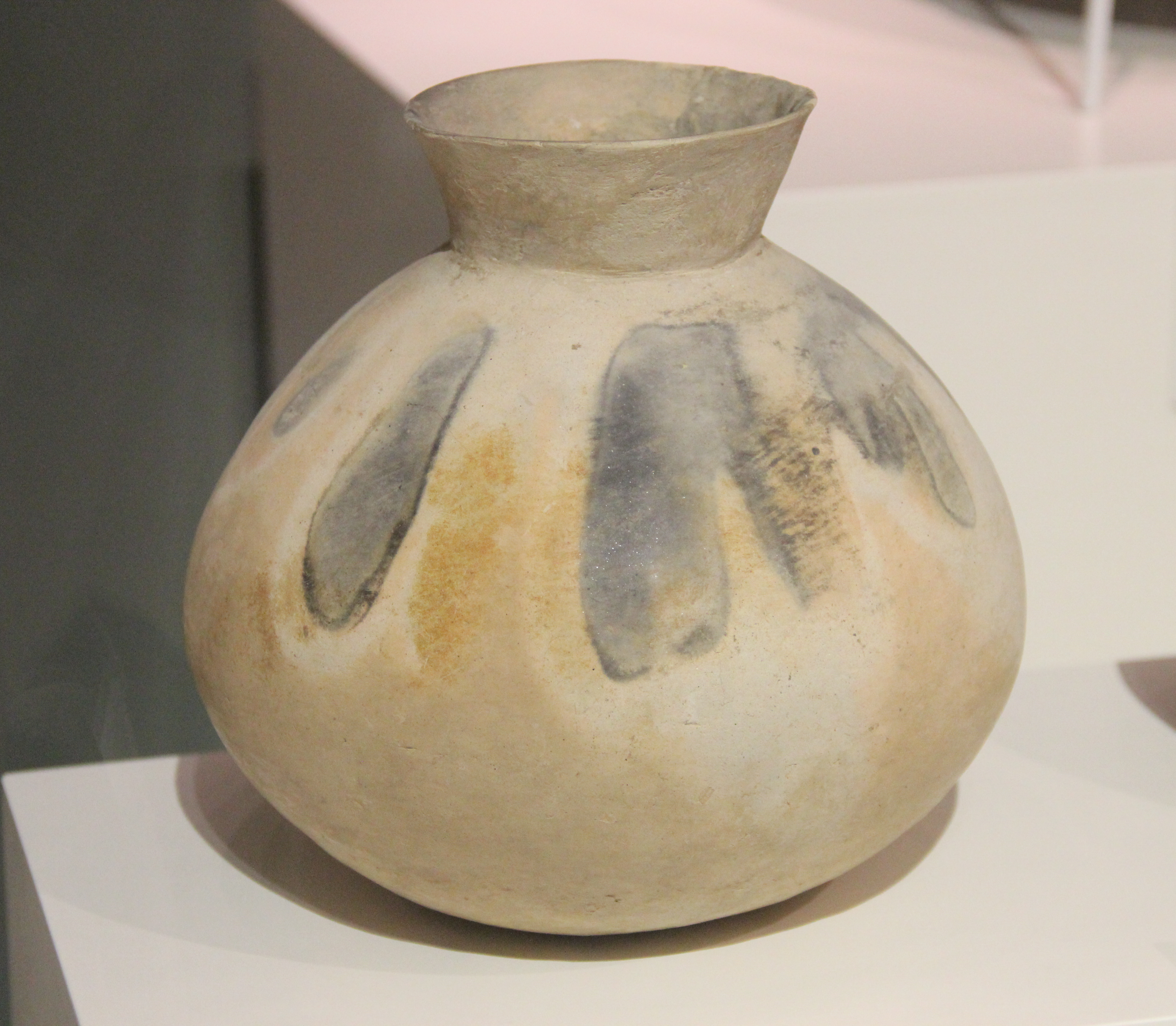

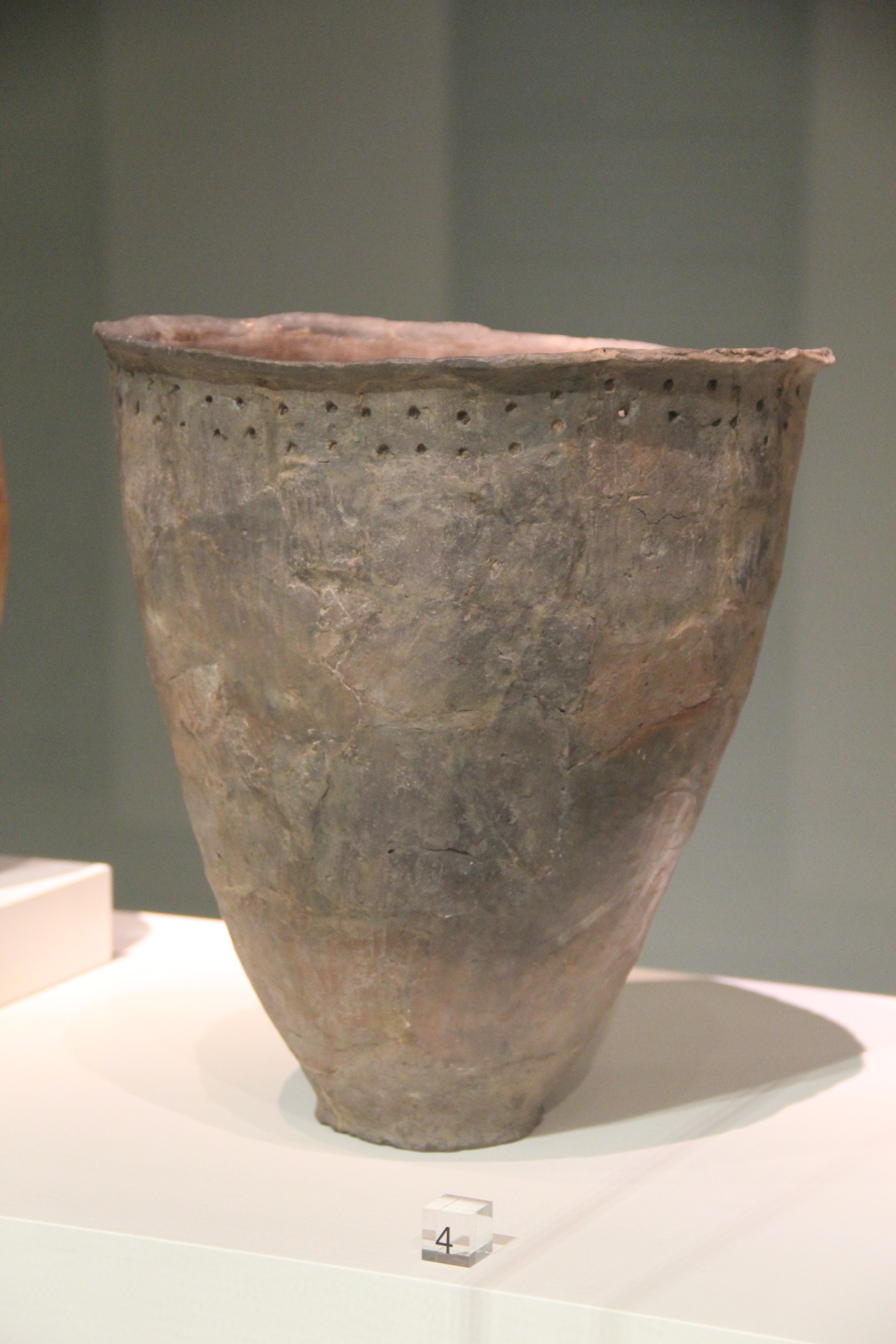

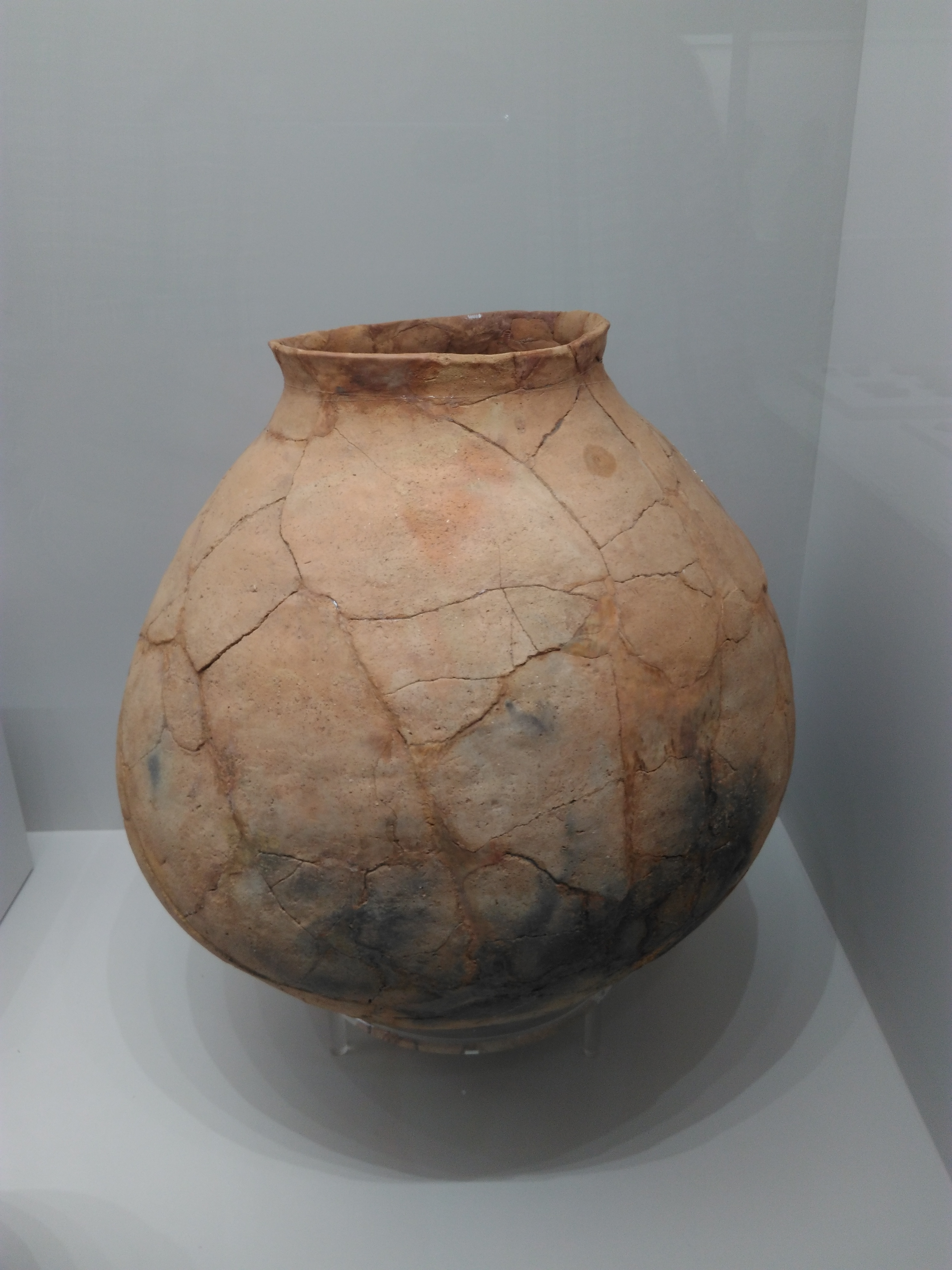

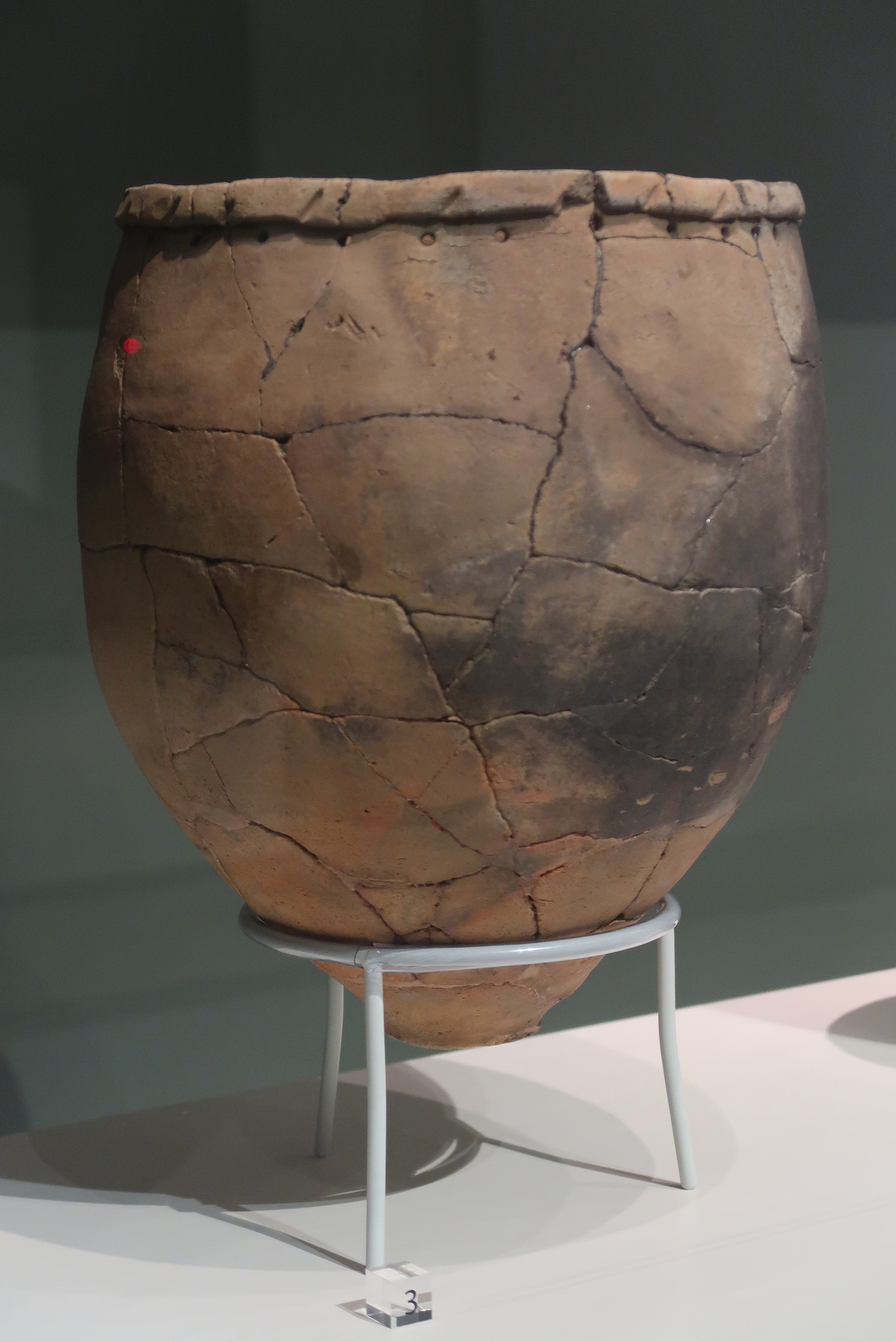

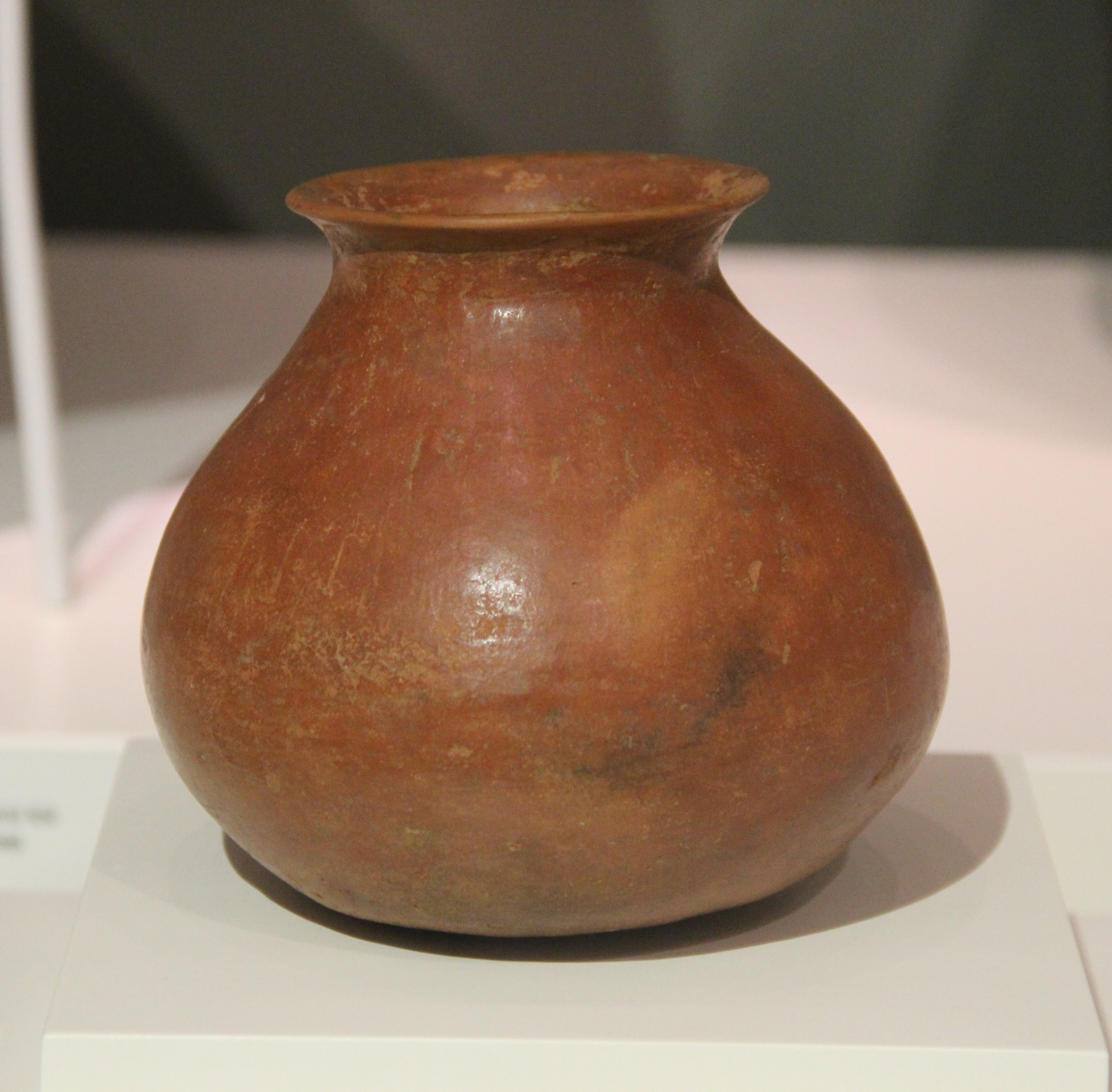

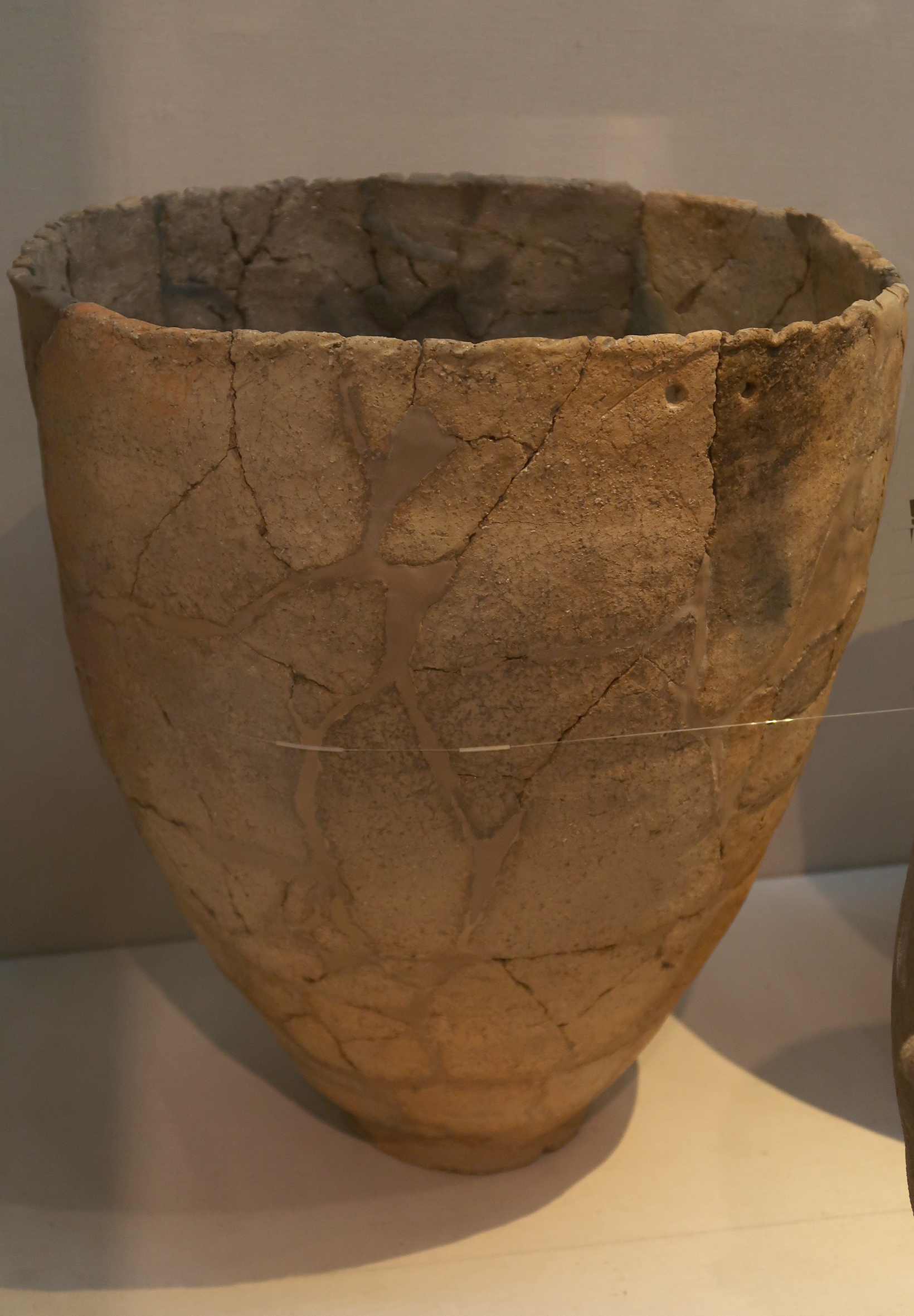

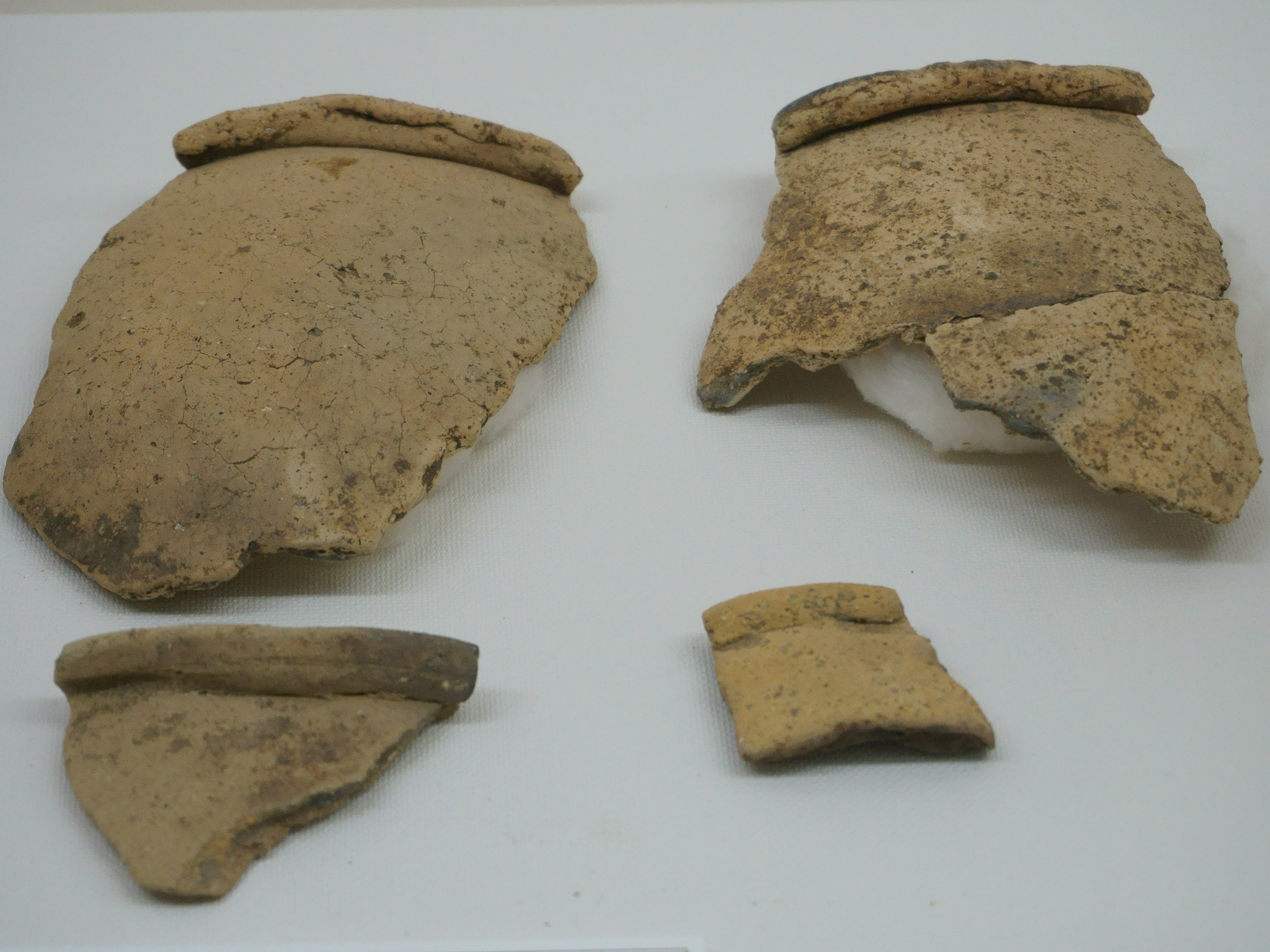

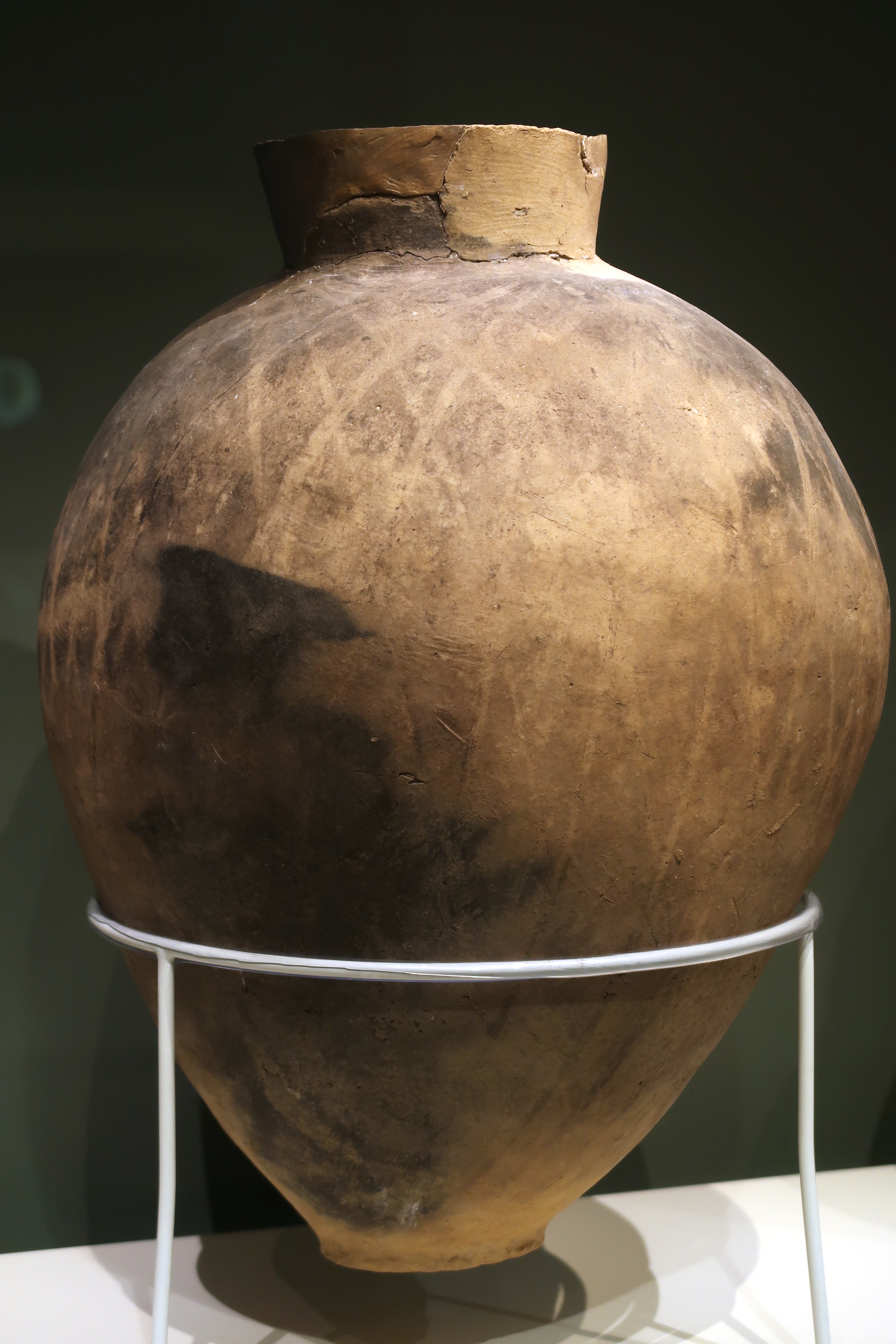

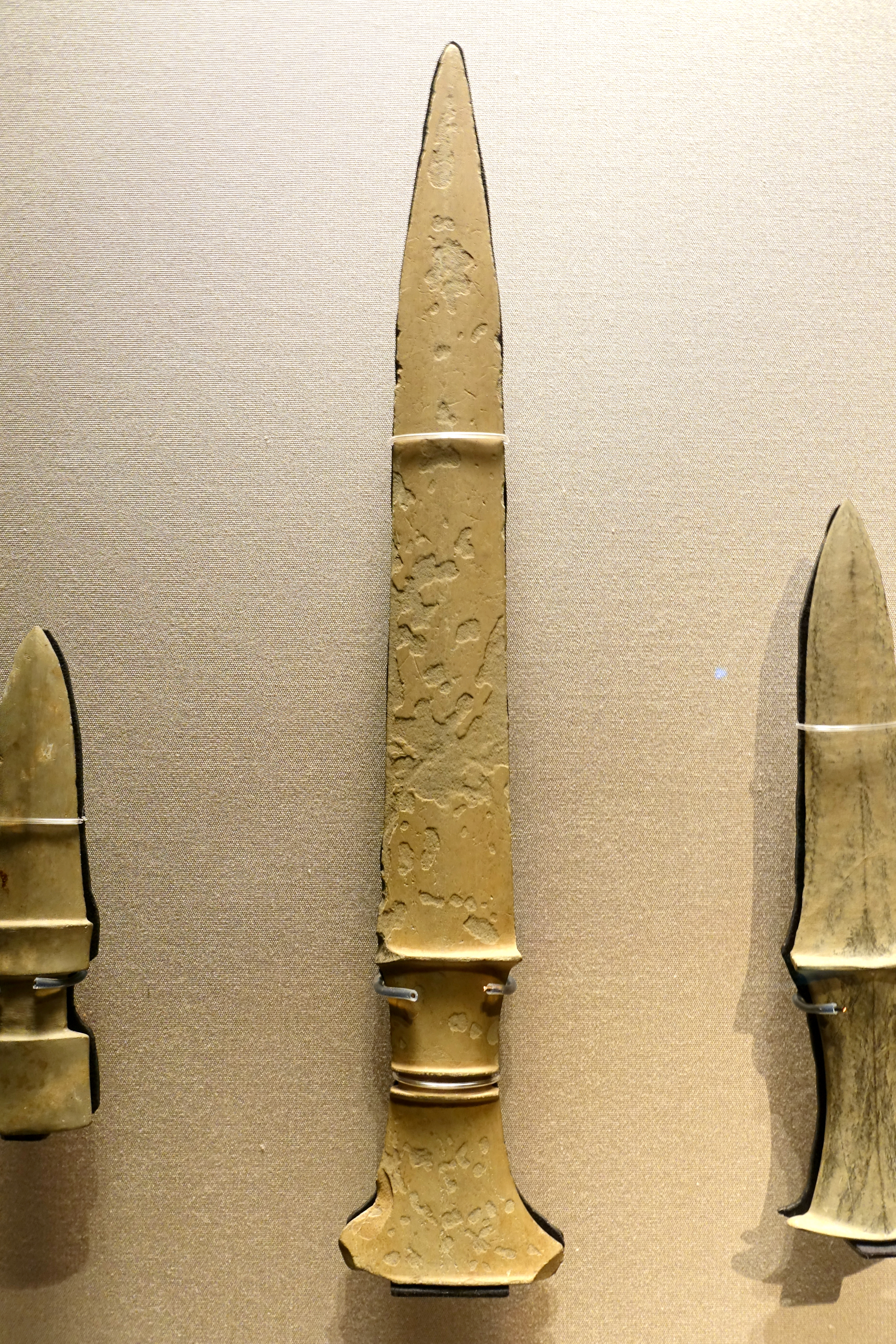

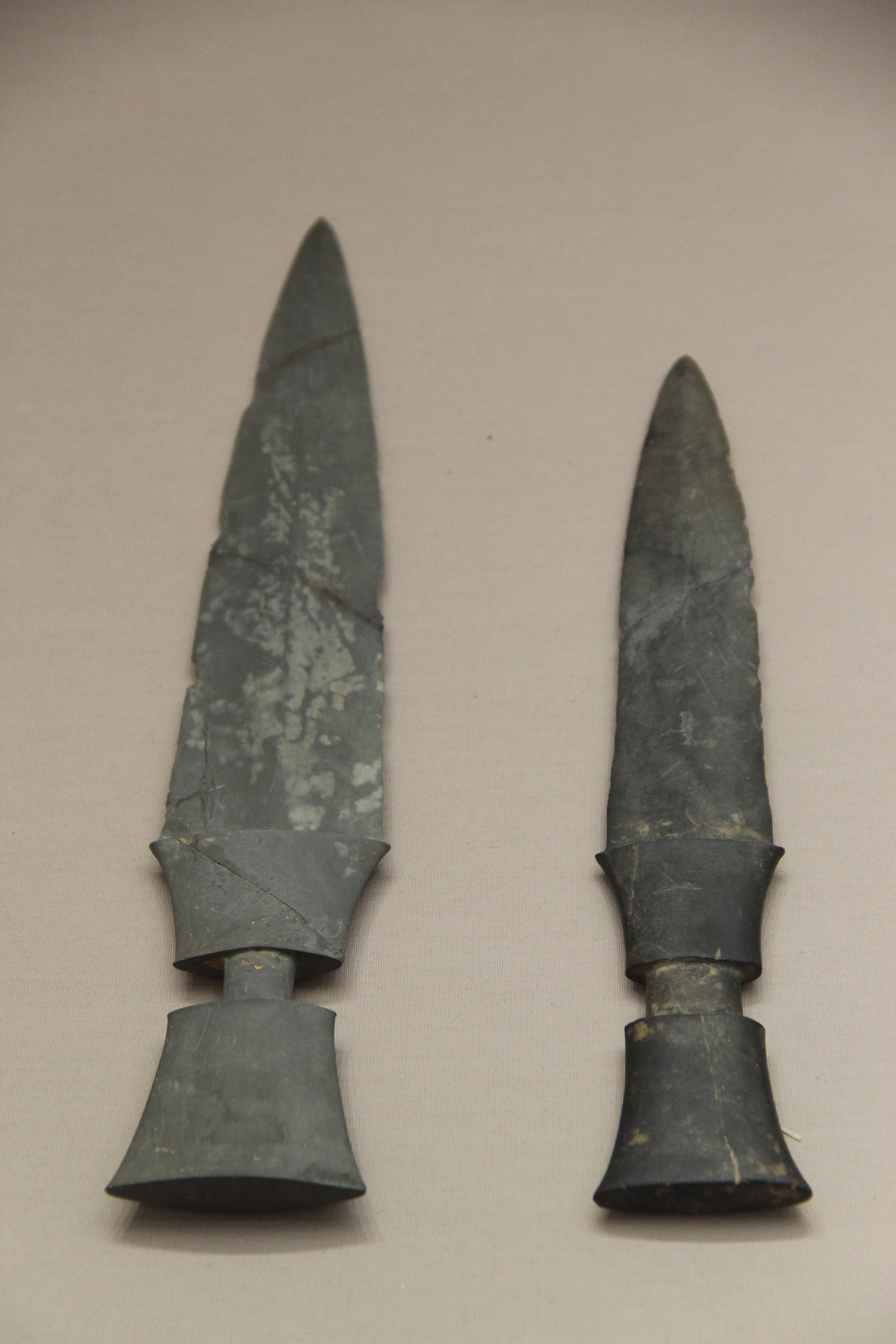

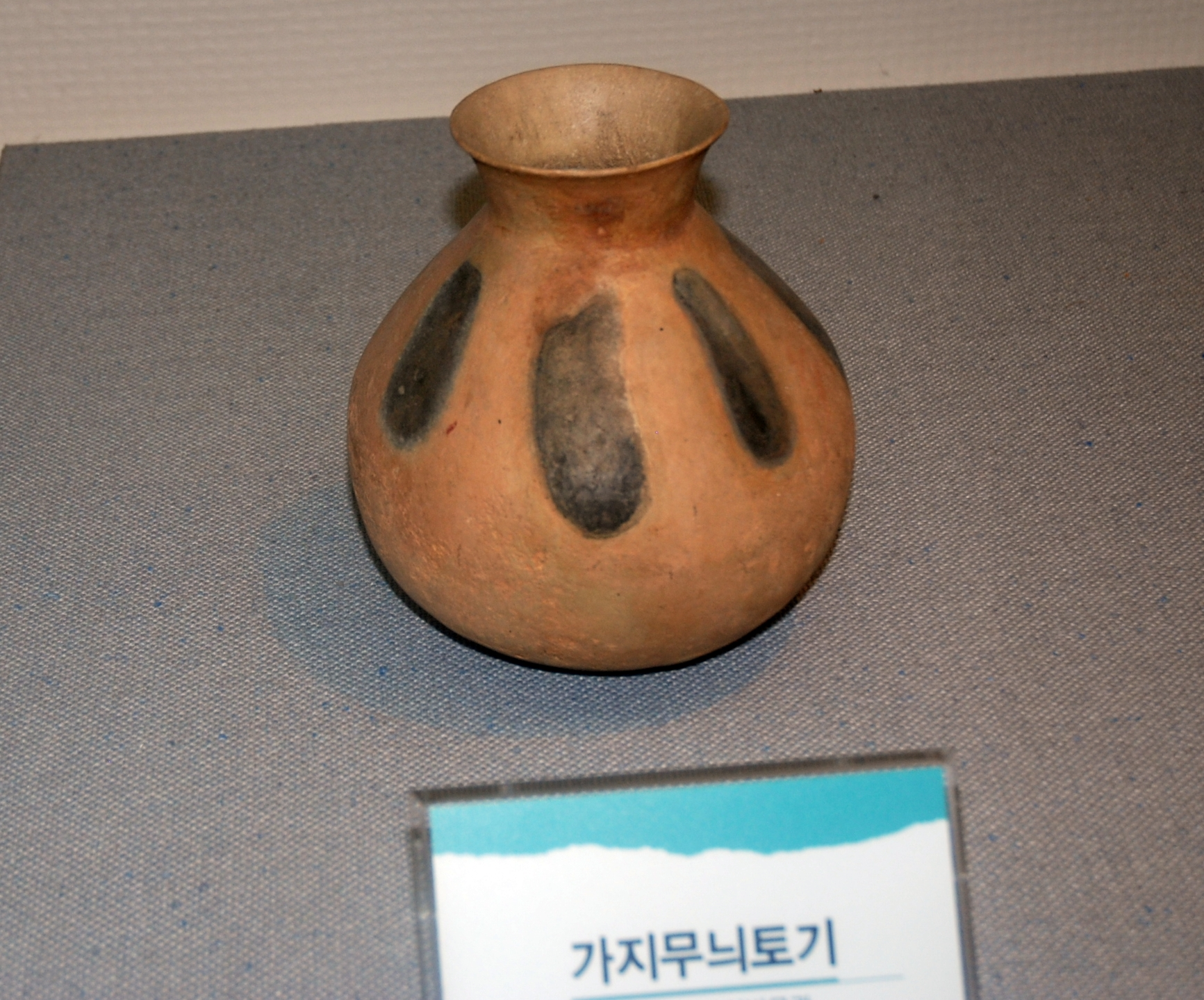

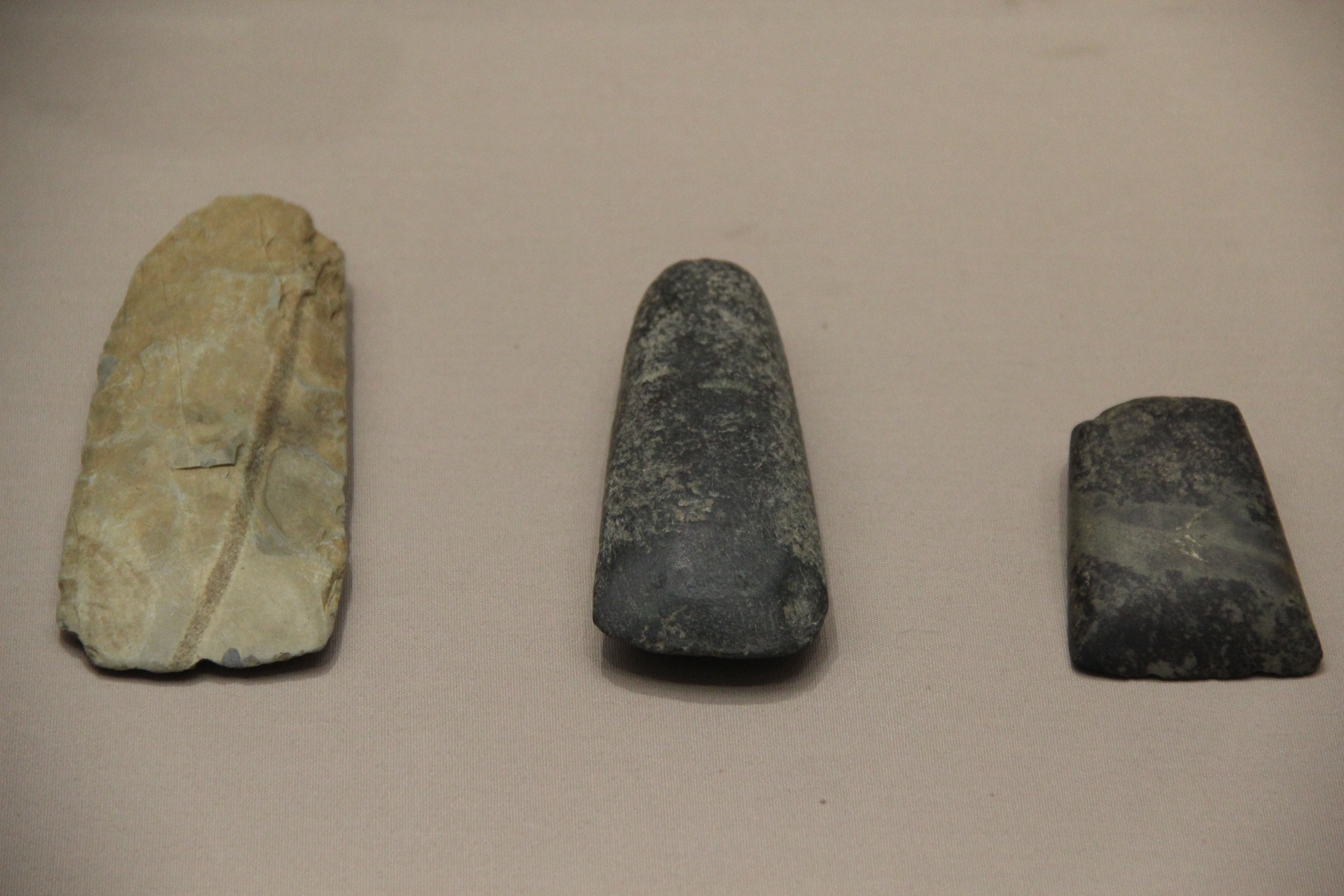

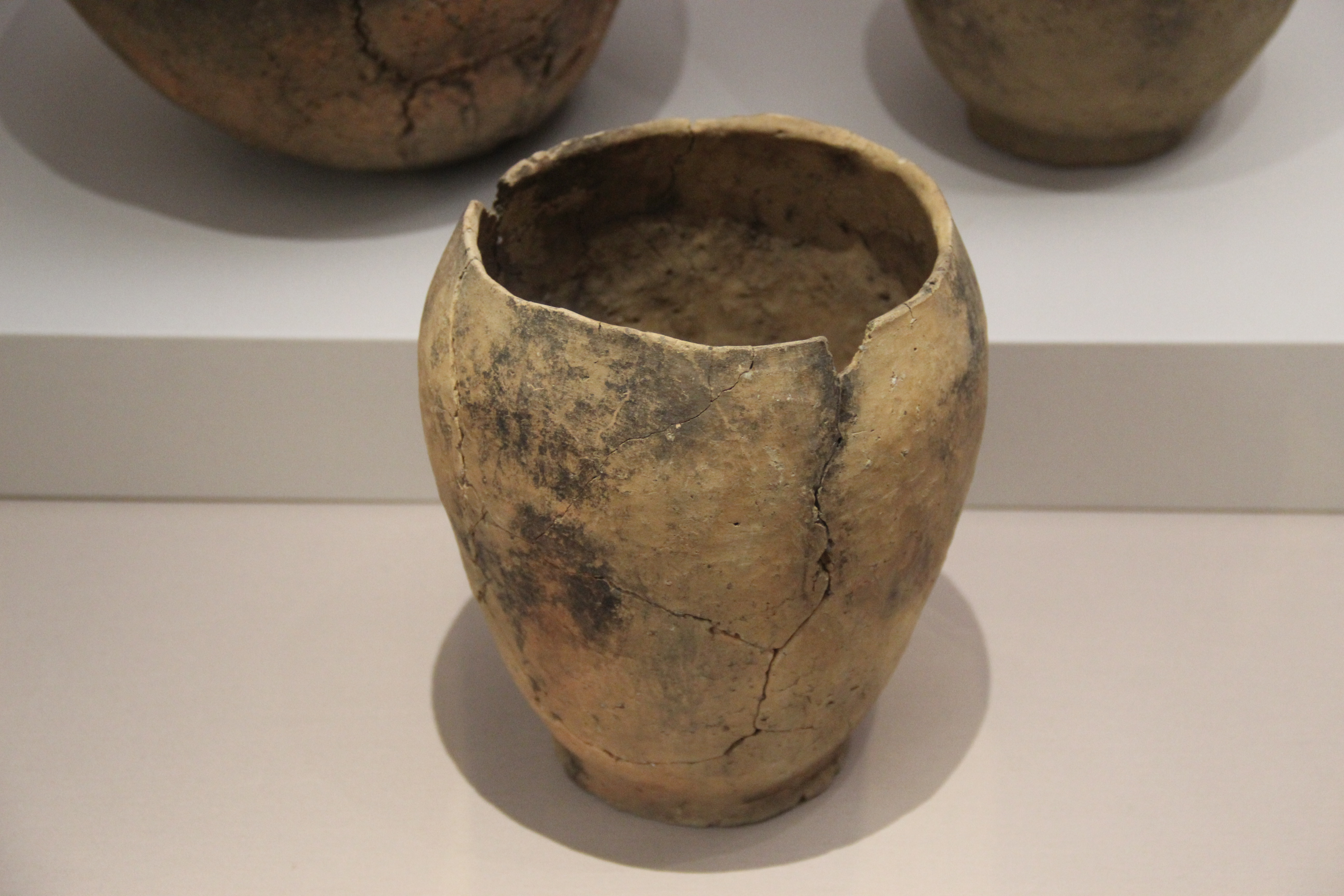

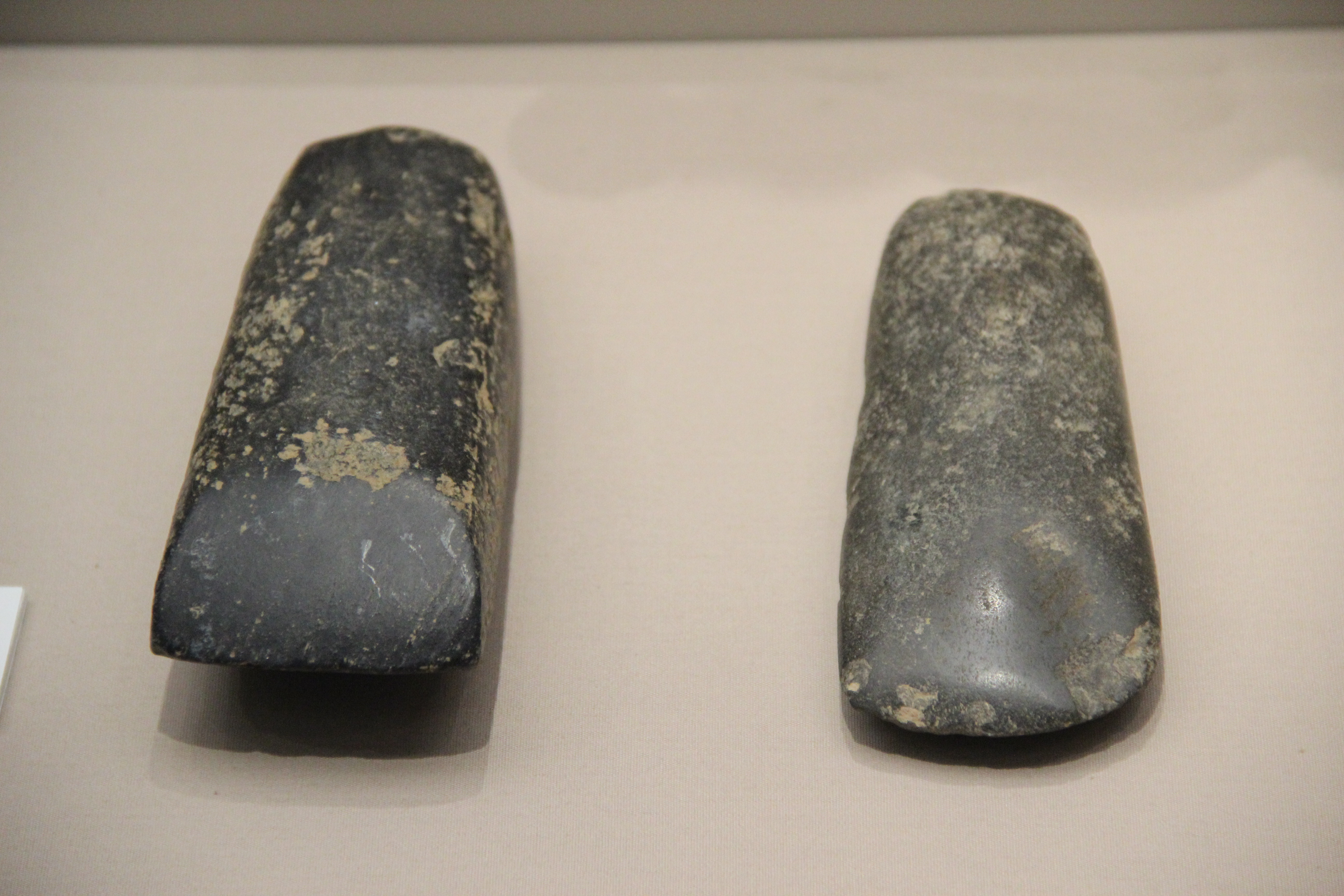

== See also ==
- Liaoning bronze dagger culture
- List of archaeological periods – master list
- Prehistoric Korea

== Sources ==
- Miyamoto, Kazuo (2016), "Archaeological Explanation for the Diffusion Theory of the Japonic and Koreanic Language" (PDF), Japanese Journal of Archeology, 4 (1): 53–75.
- Serafim, Leon A. (2008), "The uses of Ryukyuan in understanding Japanese language history", in Frellesvig, Bjarke; Whitman, John (eds.), Proto-Japanese: Issues and Prospects, John Benjamins, pp. 79–99, ISBN 978-90-272-4809-1.
- Vovin, Alexander (2017), "Origins of the Japanese Language", Oxford Research Encyclopedia of Linguistics, Oxford University Press, doi:10.1093/acrefore/9780199384655.013.277, ISBN 978-0-19-938465-5.
