= Shell Mound in Dongsam-dong, Busan =

Coordinates: 35°04′16″N 129°04′47″E

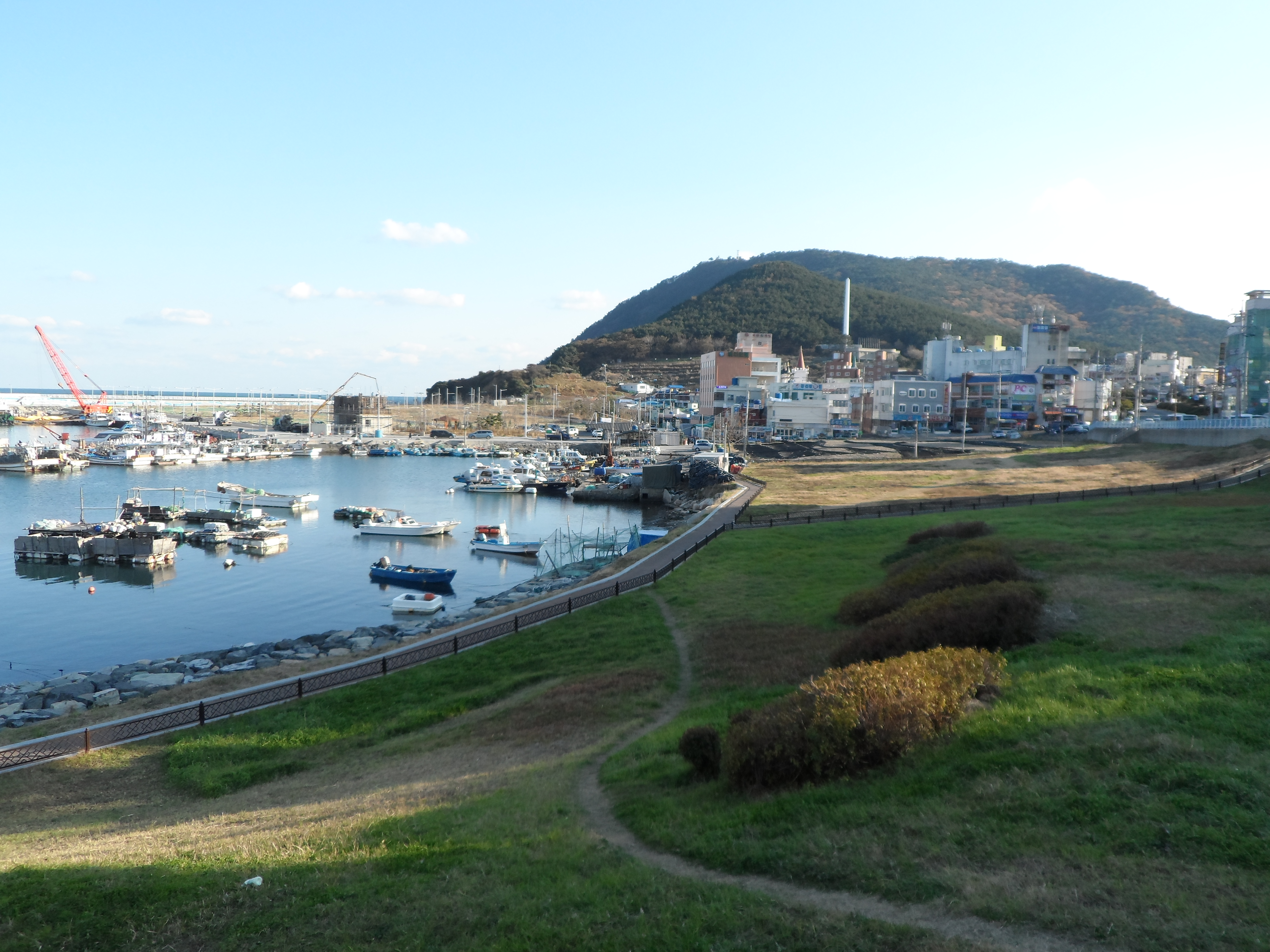

Korean name
- Hangul: 부산 동삼동 패총
- Hanja: 釜山 東三洞 貝塚
- RR: Busan Dongsam-dong paechong
- MR: Pusan Tongsam-dong p'aech'ong

Shell Mound in Dongsam-dong, Busan is located on the west coast of Yeong-do Island in Dongsam-dong, Yeongdo District, Busan, South Korea.

This archaeological site consists of a midden of shells of various mollusc taxa that were discarded in a relatively small or restricted area by people who lived there in the Jeulmun pottery period. It was excavated three times by archaeologists of the National Museum of Korea from 1969 and was found to be among the oldest Jeulmun middens so far discovered in the southern part of the Korean Peninsula. The presence of Yunggimun (appliqué-pattern) pottery indicates the site was occupied for a time between 8000-7000 BP, but many absolute dates generated from carbon that was excavated from the site indicate the site was also occupied in the Middle (c. 3500 BC) and Late (c. 2000 BC) Jeulmun sub-periods.

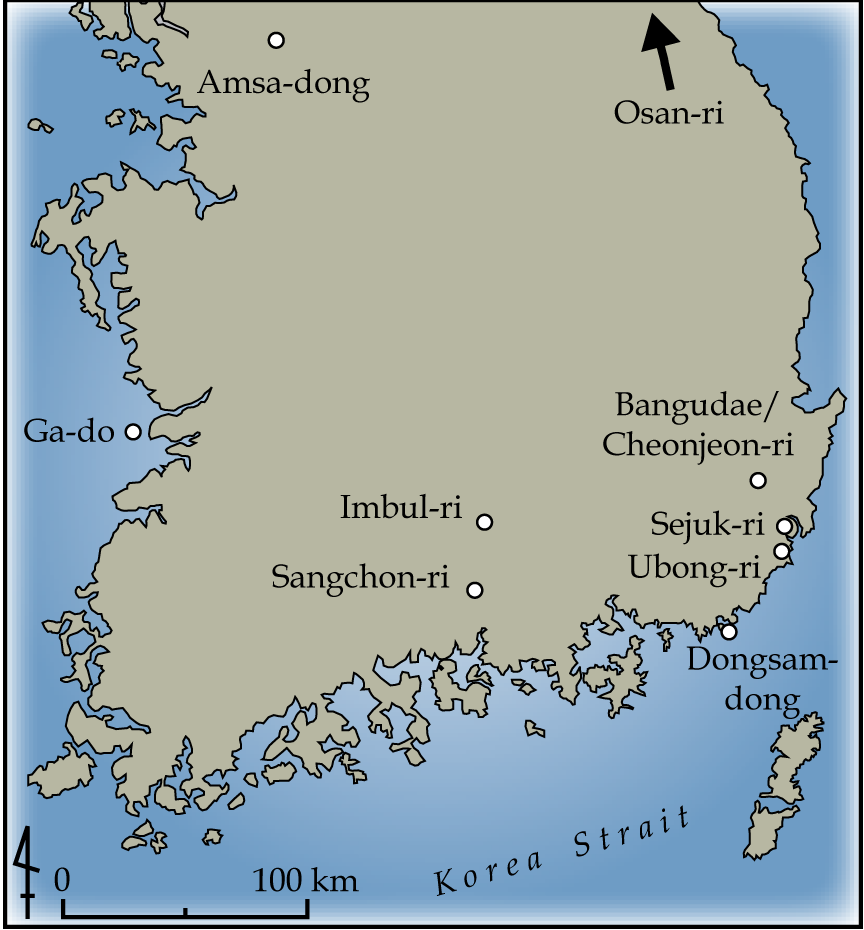
Map showing the location of the Dongsam-dong Shell Midden site and other Jeulmun period archaeological sites in South Korea.

A variety of artifacts, including three types of pottery (patternless, comb-patterned, and appliqué patterned), and tools made of bone and stone were uncovered. Artifacts and features from Dongsam-dong provide insight into the way the people of the area lived as well as into the cultural trends of the times.

The excavated remains have also proved to be valuable for estimating both the influences of Siberian culture on Korea and prehistoric exchange between southern Korea and Kyushu, Japan.

== See also ==
- Prehistoric Korea
