= Moulin d'Olivet =

Watermill in Orbigny, France

Coordinates: 47°11′33″N 1°13′35″E

Le Moulin d'Olivet
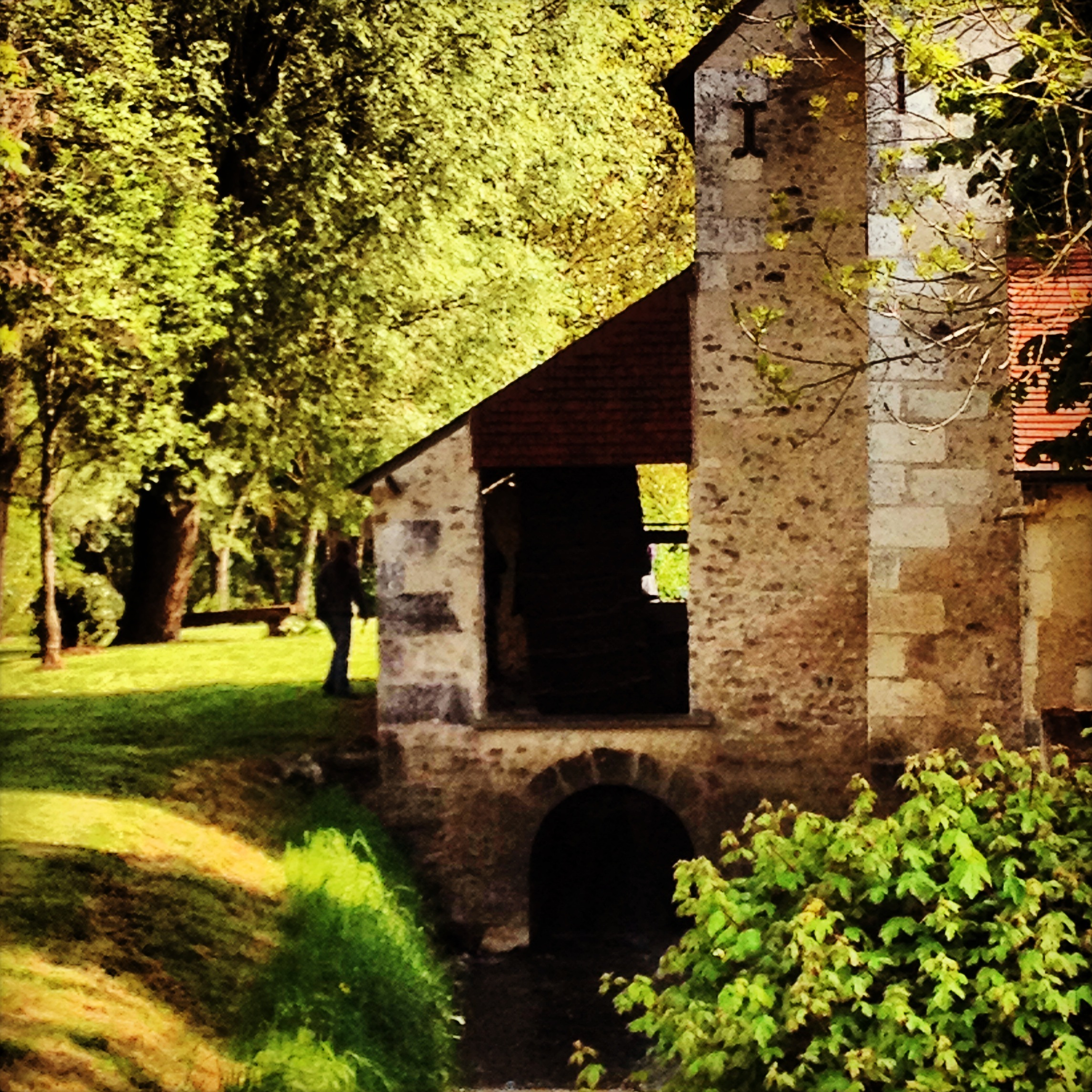

General information
- Type: Watermill
- Town or city: Orbigny, Indre-et-Loire
- Country: France
- Completed: 1763 or earlier
- Designations: grinding grain

The Moulin d'Olivet is an 18th-century watermill located at the lowest point (150 m) of the village Orbigny in the French department of Indre-et-Loire, in the region Centre.

== History ==
The use of the driving force of water is very ancient. In France, during the Middle Ages (5th - 15th century), the rulers of the time, often monks, used several hydraulic steering systems in the abbeys.

For 1000 years, the primitive mechanism which underlies the medieval mill remains the same: a water wheel linked to another wheel controls the rotational movement of the vertical shaft that drives the grinding system. This is the first machine invented by man, and the mill for making flour is the oldest type.

The millers profession - the craft of grinding grains into flour - is one of the oldest agricultural activities of mankind. In Latin mola , originally a mill, refers to the interaction of two wheels grinding cereals. One can conclude that from the 17th to 19th century the mill has been the driving force of a boom in the rural economy. The whole economy was based on the income obtained by applying the water of the rivers.

=== 1763 ===
The oldest registration of Le Moulin d'Olivet in the French archives dates back to December 24, 1763 (Act Thenon-Tours).

=== 1828 ===
The first registration in the municipal register dates from 1828 (Cadastre Napoléonien) with the description: "Moulin d’Olivet, une usine destinée à moudre le blé, sur le ruisseau d’Olivet, dans la commune d’Orbigny." The mill was powered by the force of the water of the river l'Olivet, a tributary of the Indrois river.

=== 1967 ===
Le Moulin d'Olivet was operational as a grain mill until 1967. Inside the historic Miller's House the hydraulic mechanism and the grinding unit have been preserved.

== Cultural Heritage ==
The Miller's House is part of an ancient farm complex, characteristic for the Touraine-region. These traditional farms contained a main building (fr: longère) combined with a few agricultural buildings like barns and stables (fr: bâtiments agricoles) built in a U-shape around a courtyard. Because of its historic architecture, Le Moulin d'Olivet is included in a published book about the Touraine and its traditions.

Other interesting historical:

- Principal building with a high roof structure for a wagon with grains to drive into. The first floor was used for storage.
- Hand masonry and plaster
- Traditional windows (ratio higher than width) and lintels
- Beamed ceilings
- Small barn windows and stone troughs
- Bread-oven in semi-spherical shape
- Stone engraved historical water levels
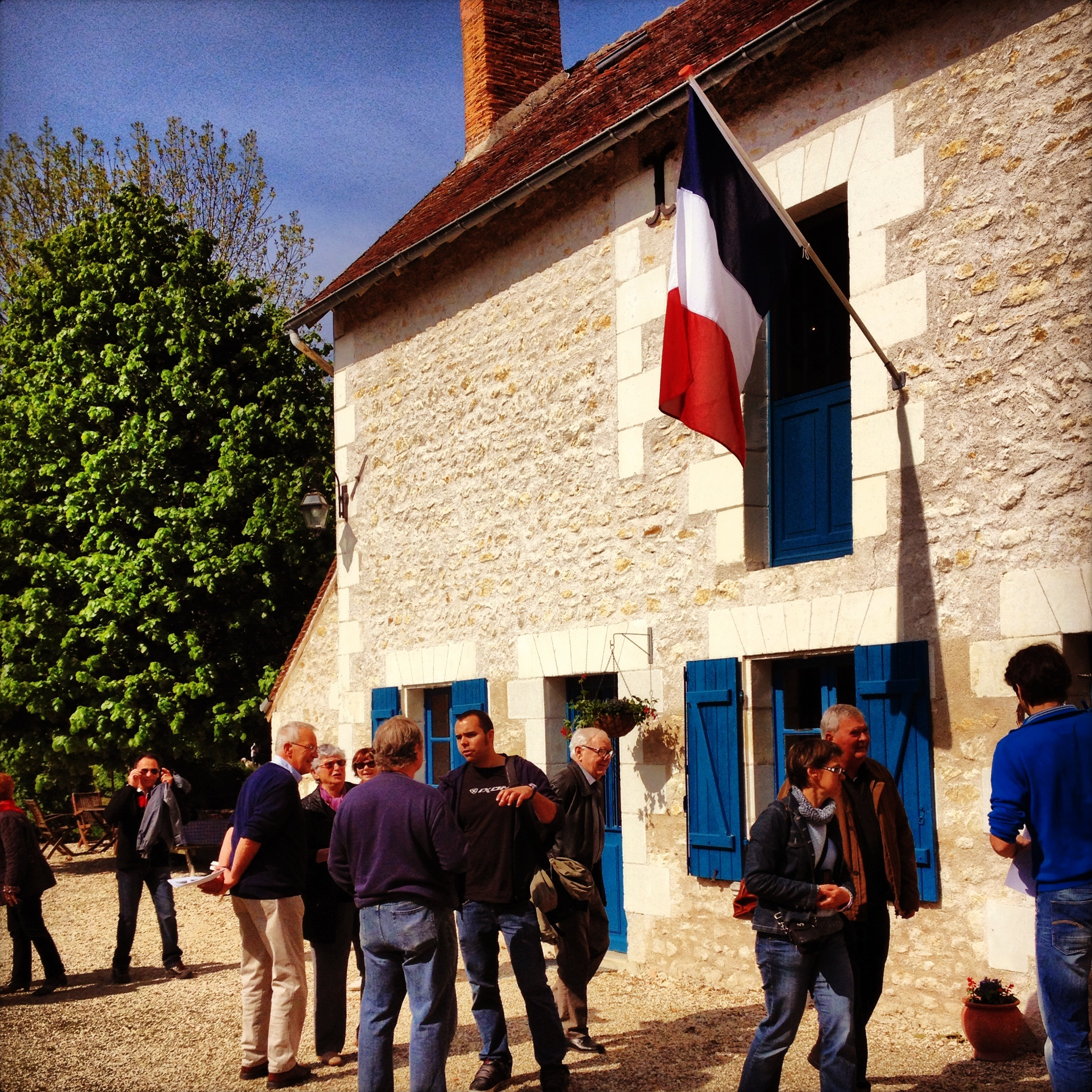
The Miller's House

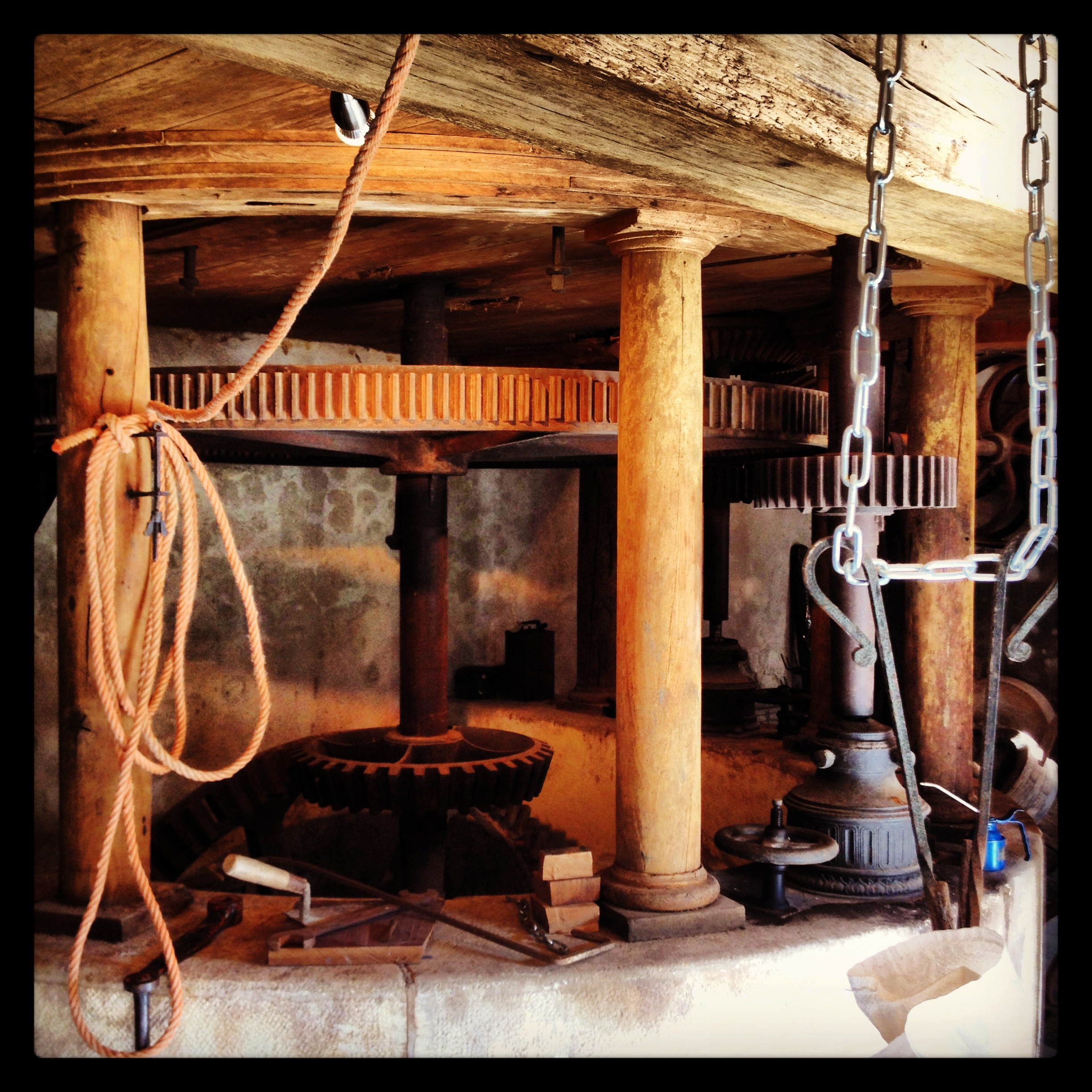
Hydraulic Mechanism

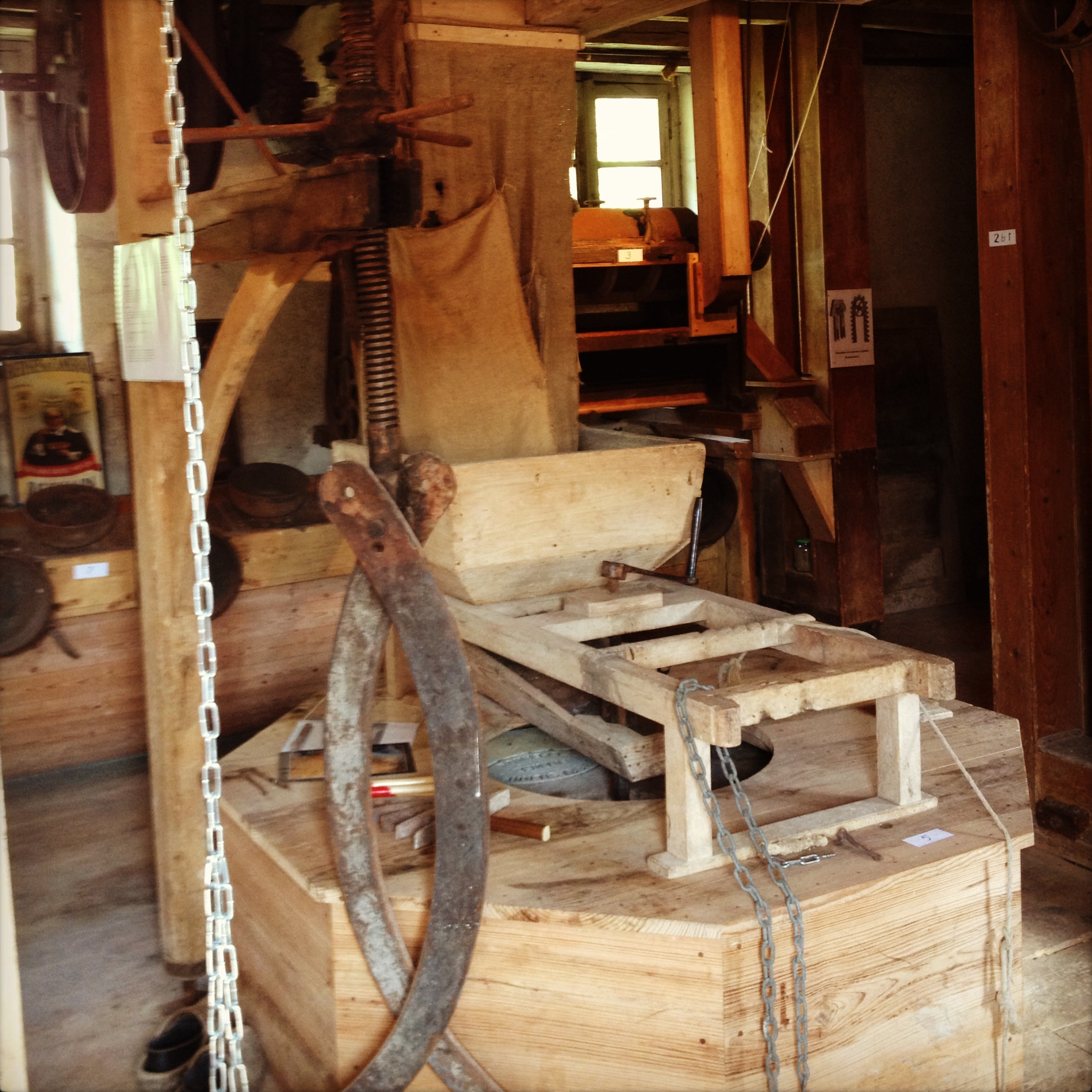
The Millstones

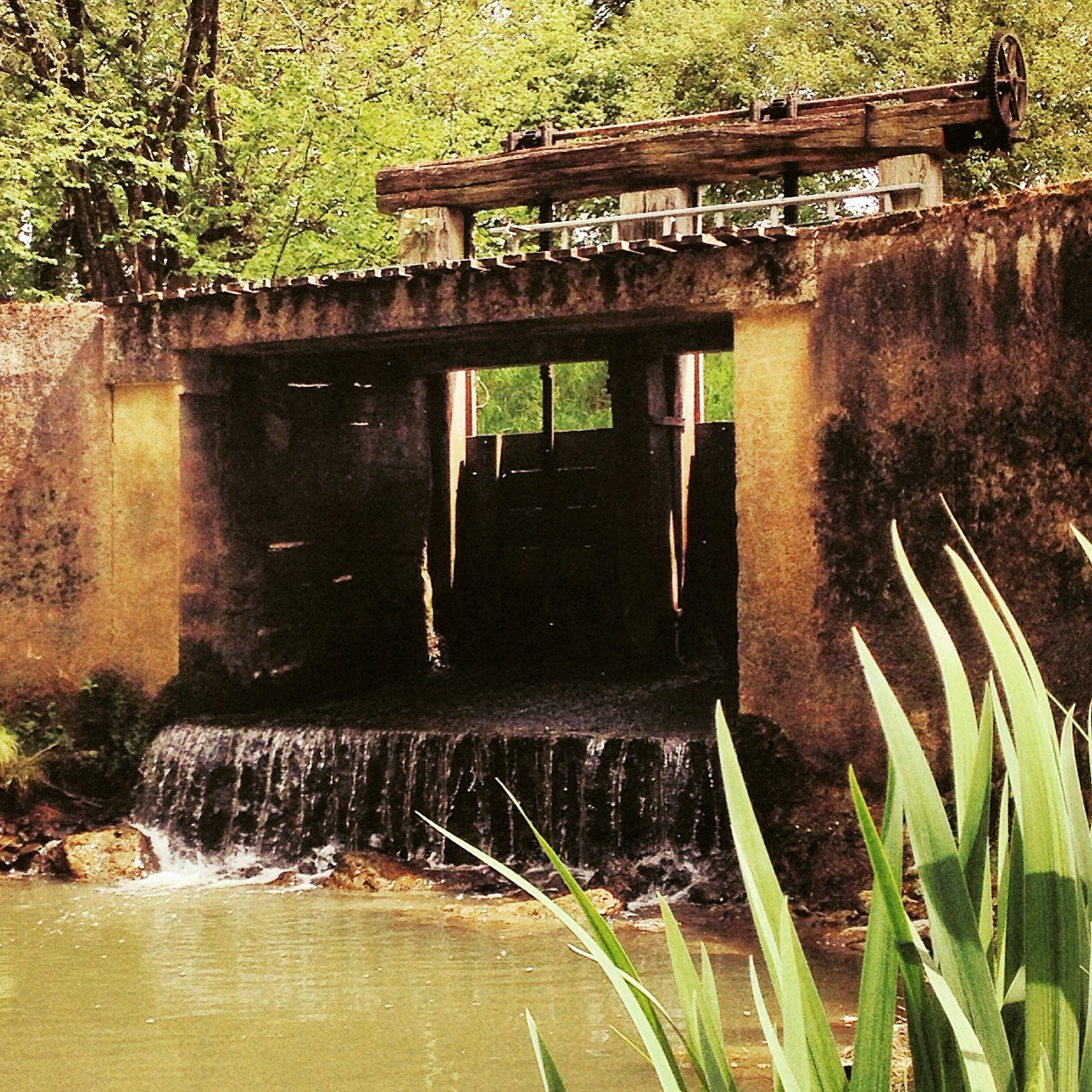
The Sluice
