= Guy Éder de La Fontenelle =

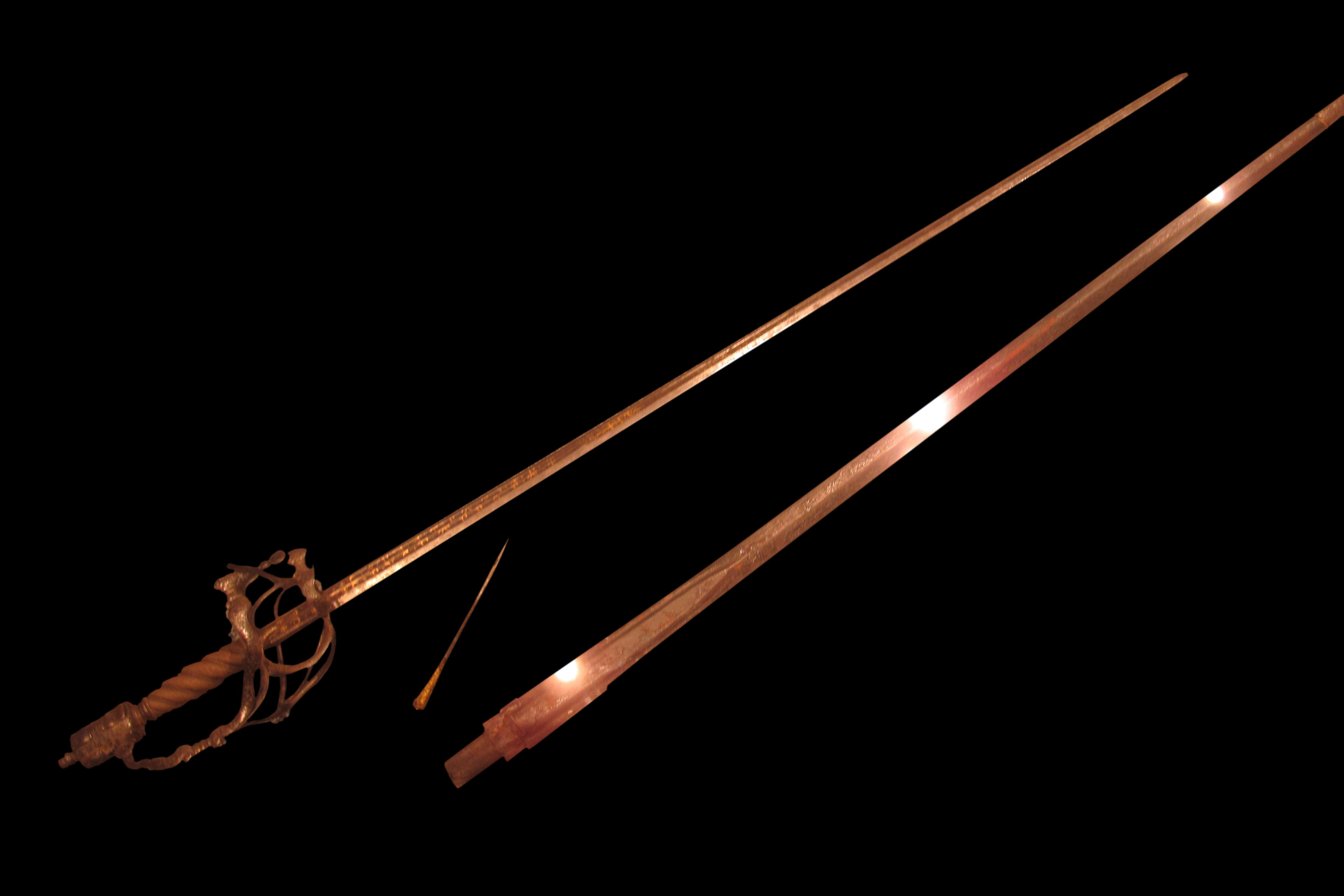
La Fontenelle's sword, on display at the Musée départemental Breton in Quimper.

Guy Éder de Beaumanoir de la Haye (1573 – September 1602), also known by his nicknames La Fontenelle or Ar Bleiz (the "Wolf" in Breton), was a French warlord active in Brittany in the late 16th century.

== Life ==
Born into an old family of Brittany in 1573 in the parish of Bothoa (today called Saint-Nicolas-du-Pélem), his family lived in Beaumanoir Manor at Leslay near Quintin (Côtes-d'Armor).

Followed by a group of young nobles, he took advantage of the weakening of the royal authority during the War of the Holy League, which initially seemed to embrace the Catholic party in going to find the Duke of Maine, Lieutenant General of France in Orléans.

Returning to his native area, he ravaged the Trégor and Cornouaille regions and entered into legend by his cruelty. Commanding a band of 400 riders, he engaged in murders, rapes, massacres and looting.

After ransacking the towns of Penmarc'h and Pont-Croix he is reported to have collected an enormous booty that was piled on the island of Tristan at Douarnenez in which he made his main quarters. He forced the nearby inhabitants into demolishing their own houses to build up the fortifications to his lair. Besieged by thousands of enraged peasants, he is reported to have killed 1,500 of them in a single day.

Regardless, in 1598 he was included in the treaty that Duke Mercœur made with Henri IV and won the king's pardon for his crimes. However, he was accused of having participated in the conspiracy of the Duke of Biron for the benefit of Spaniards, and the Parliament of Paris condemned him to the agony of the breaking wheel for high treason. He was broken on the wheel alive at Paris at the Place de Grève in September 1602.

In 1845 Théodore Hersart de la Villemarqué published a Breton song entitled Fontanella which tells the story of the abduction of Marie Le Chevoir of Coadélan, daughter of a marquis and wealthy heiress who was aged only 8 or 9 years that he would look for in the region of Brest. It is true that he took her from Mézarnou Manor in Plounéventer in 1595 and married her and that she later claimed herself as his widow at the time of his trial and execution.
