= Songguk-ri =

Archaeological type site in South Korea

- Hangul: 송국리 유적
- Hanja: 松菊里 遺蹟
- RR: Songguk-ri yujeok
- MR: Songguk-ri yujŏk

Songguk-ri (Korean pronunciation: [soŋ.ɡuŋ.ni]) is a Middle and Late Mumun-period (c. 850–300 B.C.) archaeological site in Buyeo-gun, Chungcheongnam-do, South Korea. Songguk-ri is a settlement and burial site that is important in the study of Korean prehistory. It is registered as Historical Site No. 249. Songguk-ri is a main point of reference in Korean prehistory—Korean archaeologists have represented the prehistoric village and the material culture excavated from there as the type-site for Middle Mumun Culture in southern Korea.

== History of Excavations ==
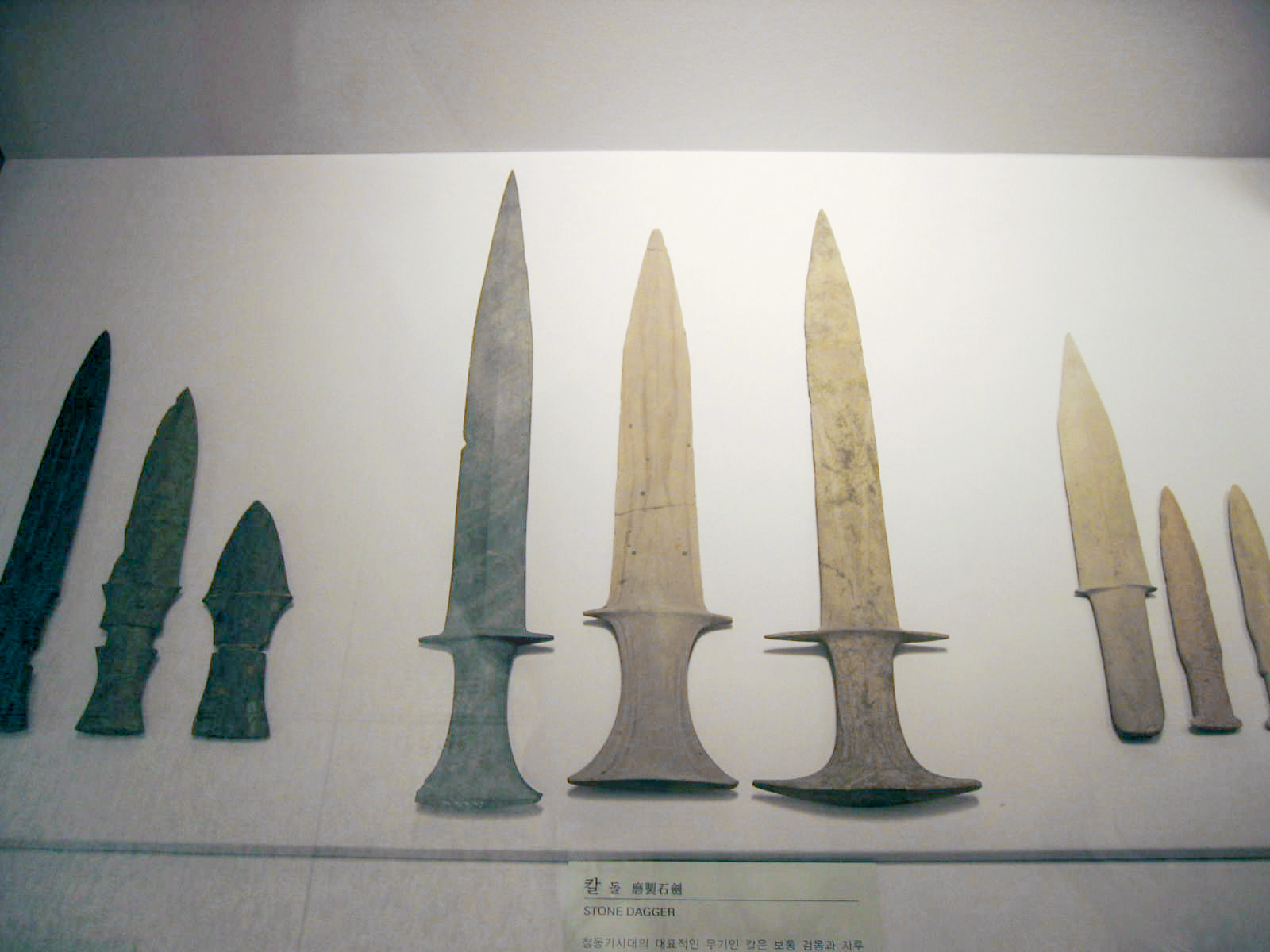
Artifacts excavated from a stone cist burial at Songguk-ri

Excavations began there in 1975 and Songguk-ri was one of the first archaeological sites in South Korea to yield bronze artifacts, large tubular greenstone beads, and pit-houses with rounded plan-shapes. Rounded pit-houses similar with those of Songguk-ri were later found at other archaeological sites along with a suite of other co-occurring artifacts prompting archaeologists to use Songguk-ri as the type site for Middle Mumun culture and label features and artifacts from there and other Middle Mumun sites as 'Songguk-ri Style'. In particular, the term Songguk-ri-style pit-house is the typological name given to Middle Mumun Period dwellings in southern Korea. The site has been excavated a number of times by branches of the National Museum of Korea (Buyeo National Museum 2000; National Museum of Korea 1979, 1986, 1987).

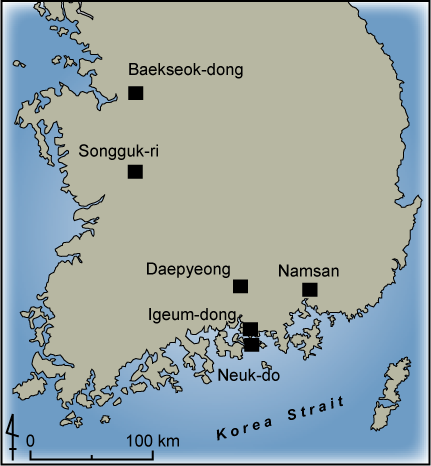
The location of Songguk-ri and other Mumun Period settlement sites in the Korean Peninsula that are mentioned in other Wikipedia articles.

== Layout ==
Groups of pit-houses are found in various spots in an area of almost 100,000 km^{2}. Forty-four pit-houses were excavated at Songguk-ri (O 1997). Pottery that is typically found in the Late Middle Mumun (c. 700–550 B.C.) was unearthed from the pit-houses, but some pit-houses may date to the Late Mumun. Evidence of an imposing palisade erected around one of the residential precincts at the site has been found, leading archaeologists to hypothesize about conflict and competition in the local Mumun society. A number of smaller settlements from the same time period are found within several kilometres of Songguk-ri.

The site also contains a high status stone-cist burial with a Liaoning-style bronze dagger, a number of large tubular-shaped greenstone ornaments, and a finely-made groundstone dagger. A number of jar-burials have been unearthed from the site.

The site was reviewed in 2022.

== Historical significance ==
Songguk-ri was likely part of the central settlement distributed amongst smaller settlements in the Seokseong-cheon River valley that briefly formed a simple chiefdom for approximately one or two generations in the Middle Mumun. Songguk-ri is one of the well-known sites from Korean prehistory that displays some formative examples of characteristics of Protohistoric chiefdoms such as Mahan, Byeonhan, and early states such as Baekje. For example, Songguk-ri contains evidence of several long-term trends in Korean prehistory and protohistory such as the existence of social status distinctions and the use of prestige artifacts such as greenstone and metal (e.g. Liaoning-style bronze dagger) in burials. It is thus that Songguk-ri and other such prehistoric sites of a similar age (e.g. Igeum-dong, Daepyeong, etc.) are referred to when we begin the discussion regarding the origins of social complexity and the formation of states in the Korean Peninsula.

It has been theorised that the Songguk-ri culture was one that saw a significant economic change in subsistence strategy in the creation of rice paddy culture and away from a hunter-gatherer emphasis. Analysis of rice found at Songguk-ri is regarded as demonstrating that in the Bronze Age rice was a community food and not the luxury/ currency that it became in historical times. Bronze hairpins found at Songguk-ri are identified as having been produced from a mould found at Neungsan-ri, Bunyeo. There has been much debate as to the relative dating of the Songguk-ri / "pre-"Songgukri and other indigenous settlements.

Triangular stone harvesting knives, which developed out of lunate-shaped knives, are a characteristic of Songguk-ri culture, and resemble knives also found in Yayoi culture sites.

== Archaeological Reports ==
- Buyeo National Museum 2000 Songguk-ri VI [Songguk-ri Site VI]. Report of the Research of Antiquities of the National Museum, Vol. 6. Buyeo National Museum, Buyeo.
- Gongju National Museum 1993 Songguk-ri V: Mokchaek (1) [Songguk-ri Site V: Wooden Palisade (1)]. Gongju National Museum, Gongju.
- National Museum of Korea 1979 Songguk-ri I [Songguk-ri Site I]. Report of the Research of Antiquities of the National Museum of Korea, Vol. 11. National Museum of Korea, Seoul. 1986 Songguk-ri II [Songguk-ri Site II]. Report of the Research of Antiquities of the National Museum of Korea, Vol. 18. National Museum of Korea, Seoul. 1987 Songguk-ri III [Songguk-ri Site III]. Report of the Research of Antiquities of the National Museum of Korea, Vol. 19. National Museum of Korea, Seoul.
- O, Se-yeon 1997 Buyeo Songguk-ri Yujeok-eui Jugeo Yangsang: [Aspects of Settlement at the Songguk-ri Site, Buyeo]. In Honam Gogohak Jemunje [Problems in the Archaeology of Honam]:159–175. Papers of the 21st National Meetings of the Korean Archaeological Society, Gwangju.

== See also ==
- Prehistory of Korea
- Mumun Pottery Period
- Daepyeong
- Igeum-dong
- Bangudae Petroglyphs
