= Longhouse =

Communal, narrow, single-room building

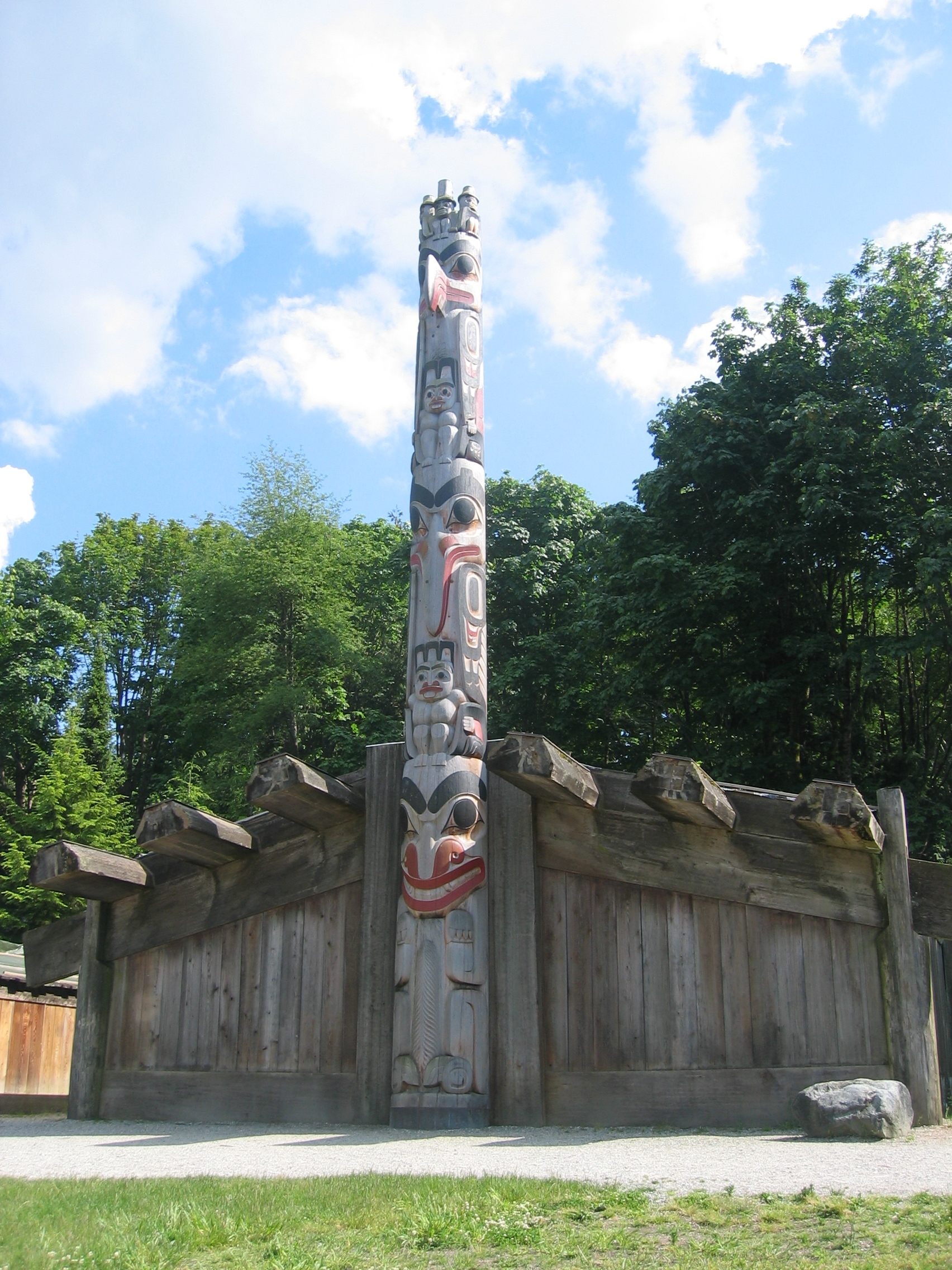
A North American Pacific Northwest Coast-style longhouse at the Museum of Anthropology at the University of British Columbia

A longhouse or long house is a type of long, proportionately narrow, single or multi-room building for communal dwelling. It has been built in various parts of the world including Asia, Europe, and North America.

Many were built from timber and often represent the earliest form of permanent structure in many cultures. Types include the Neolithic long house of Europe, the Norman Medieval Longhouses that evolved in Western Britain (Tŷ Hir) and Northern France (Longère), and the various types of longhouse built by different cultures among the indigenous peoples of the Americas.

== Europe ==
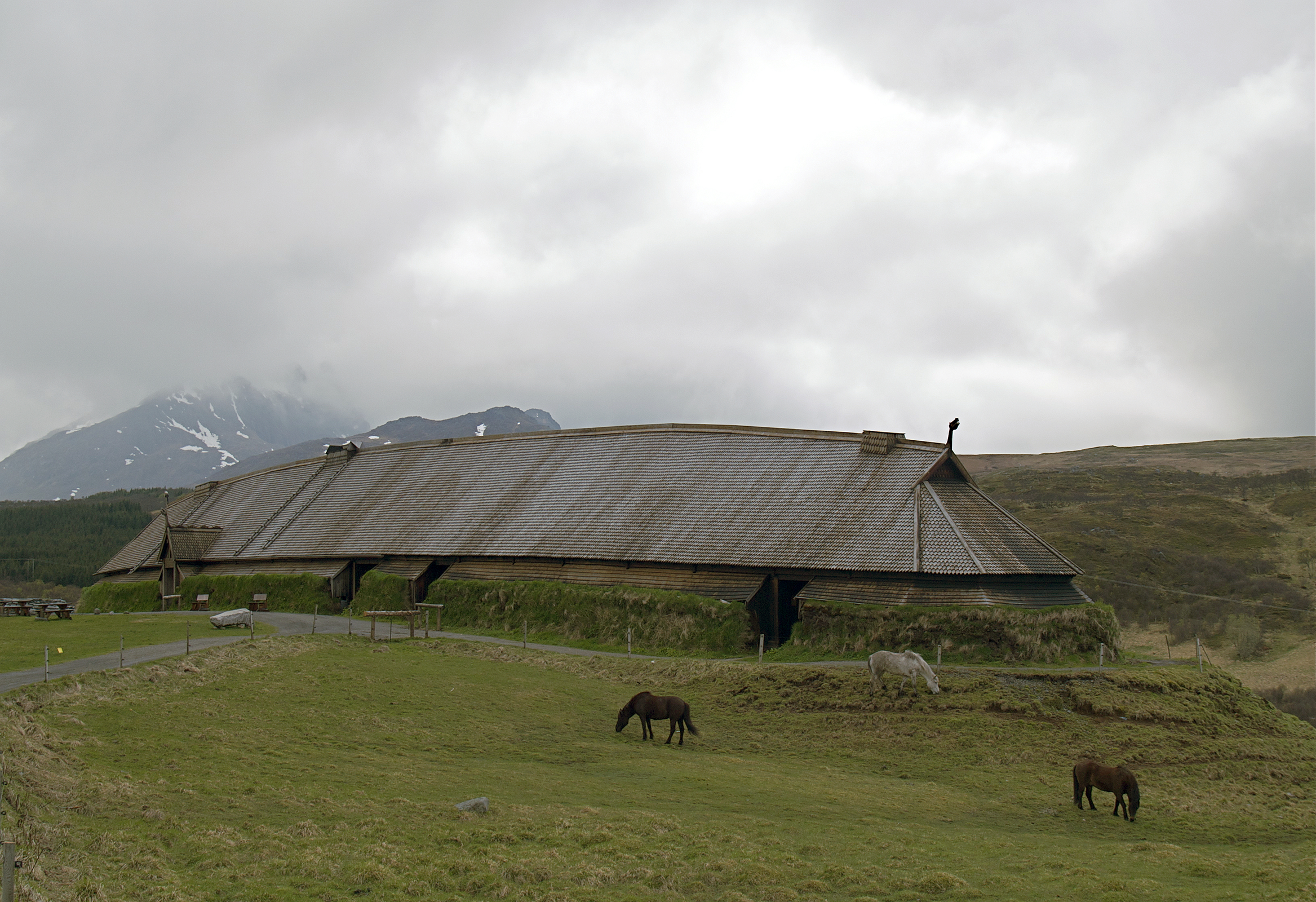
A reconstructed Viking chieftain's longhouse at the Lofotr Viking Museum in Lofoten, Norway

The Neolithic long house type was introduced with the first farmers of Central and Western Europe around 5000 BCE, 7,000 years ago. These were farming settlements built in groups of six to twelve longhouses; they were home to large extended families and kin.

The Germanic cattle-farmer longhouses emerged along the southwestern North Sea coast in the third or fourth century BCE and may be the ancestors of several medieval house types such as the Scandinavian langhus; the English, Welsh, and Scottish longhouse variants; and the German and Dutch Low German house. The longhouse is a traditional form of shelter.

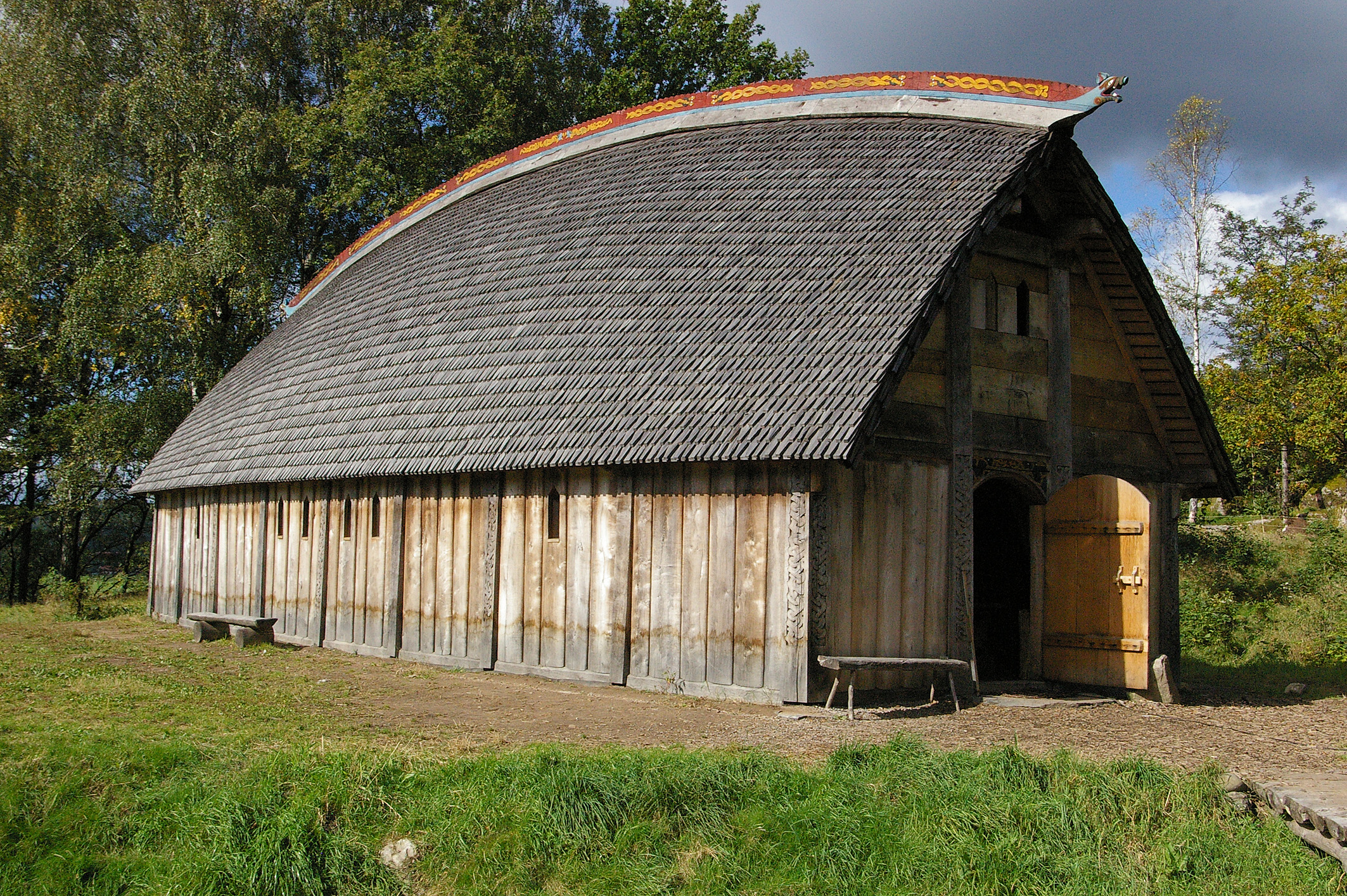
Reconstructed Viking longhouse in Ale, north of Gothenburg, Sweden

Some of the medieval longhouse types of Europe that have survived are the following:

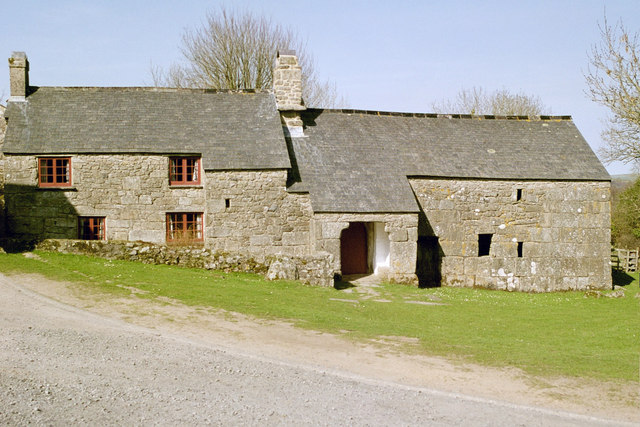
Dartmoor granite longhouse

=== Dartmoor longhouse ===
The Western Brittonic "Dartmoor longhouse" variants in Devon, Cornwall, and Wales, where it is known as the Tŷ Hir, are often typified by the use of cruck construction. It is built along a slope, and a single passage gives access to both human and animal shelter under a single roof.

There are dozens of pre-1600 longhouses remaining on Exmoor and the surrounding area. Some can be dated using dendrochronology to before 1400, but sites can be much older and have names with a Saxon origin. Longhouses on Exmoor are typically a single-storey building, one room deep, laid out as two crucked bays, a cross passage and two crucked bays. As glass was not available until the middle of the 16th century, they were oriented loosely east-west with openings (for a door and latticed unglazed windows) only in the south wall to provide the maximum shelter from the worst weather and catch the sun.

They are often dug into the hillside, the lower parts of the walls being formed from rough stone in mud pointing with cob above since before the 17th century lime cement was virtually unknown.The floors were not made a true level. Livestock were kept at the lower end. A hole was often provided in the base of the end wall for mucking out. The cross-passage (often misnamed, as a breezeway did not pass right through the building) establishes distinct areas for people in one half of the house and livestock in the other but would be needed for only a couple of months at most in the winter. There was a fire pit, sometimes with a stone reredos (as in Hendre’r-ywydd Uchaf Farmhouse, Denbighshire), behind which the smoke rose to the eaves and passed through the thatch.

As skills and wealth increased, after 1500 many had built-in settles, and by 1700 most would have been adapted and have separate buildings for livestock, a second storey, stairways, a chimney with bread oven, an outshot (pantry/larder/dairy which was only accessible from inside the house), glazed windows, lime-screed floors and at least some decorative plasterwork.

=== Other European longhouses ===
Other European longhouse types include the northwest England type in Cumbria, the Scottish longhouse, "blackhouse" or taighean-dubha, and the Scandinavian or Viking Langhus/Långhus and mead hall.

The Western French longhouse or maison longue from Lower Brittany, Normandy, Mayenne, Anjou (also in the Cantal, Lozère and the Pyrenees Ariège), is very similar to the western British type with shared livestock quarters and central drain.

The Old Frisian longhouse or Langhuis developed into the Frisian farmhouse by integrating a large barn, typical of the Gulf house (German: Gulfhaus), which from the 16th century spread from the Southern Netherlands along the North Sea coast to the east and north.

=== Medieval development of the Germanic longhouse ===
Further developments of the Germanic longhouse during the Middle Ages were the Low German house in northern and especially northwestern Germany and its northern neighbour, the Geestharden house in Jutland including Schleswig, with its variant, the Frisian house. With these house types the wooden posts originally rammed into the ground were replaced by posts supported on a base. The large and well-supported attic enabled large quantities of hay or grain to be stored in dry conditions. This development may have been driven because the weather became wetter over time. Good examples of these houses have been preserved, some dating back to the 16th century. The longhouse was 50 to 60 feet long.

== Americas ==
In North America two groups of longhouses emerged: the Native American/First Nations longhouse of the tribes usually connected with the Iroquois (Haudenosaunee) in the northeast, and a similarly shaped structure which arose independently among the indigenous peoples of the Pacific Northwest Coast.

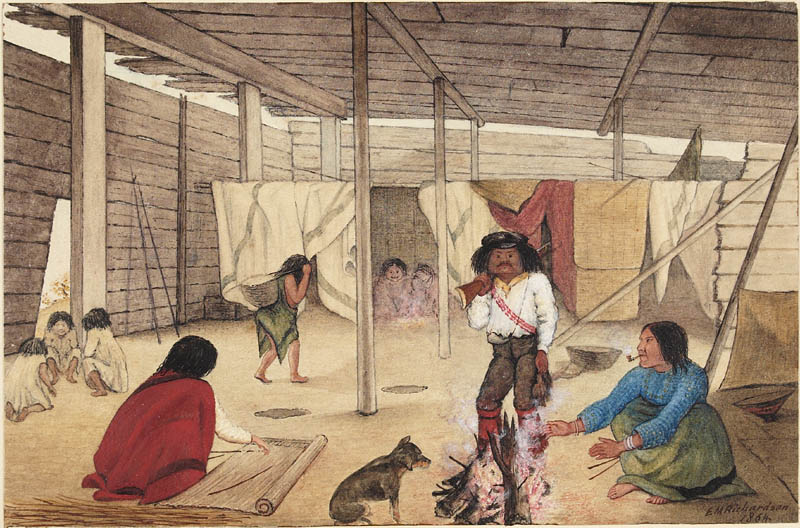
Interior of a Salish longhouse, British Columbia, 1864. Watercolour by Edward M. Richardson (1810–1874).

The longhouses inhabited by the Iroquois were wood boards/bark-covered structures of standardized design "in the shape of an arbor" about 6 to 7 metres (20 to 23 ft) wide providing shelter for several related families. The longhouse had a 3-metre-wide (9.8 ft) central aisle and 2-metre-wide (6.6 ft) compartments, about 6 to 7 metres (20 to 23 ft) long, down each side. The end compartments were usually used for storage. Hearths were spaced about 6 to 7 metres (20 to 23 ft) apart down the aisle, with smoke holes in the roof. Two families shared each hearth. Each longhouse would house several generations of an extended family; a house was built proportionately to the number of families it was expected to contain and might be lengthened over time to accommodate growth. It is possible to infer the population of an Iroquois town from the sizes and number of longhouses it contained.

In Virginia, native tribes lived in longhouses known as yehakins.

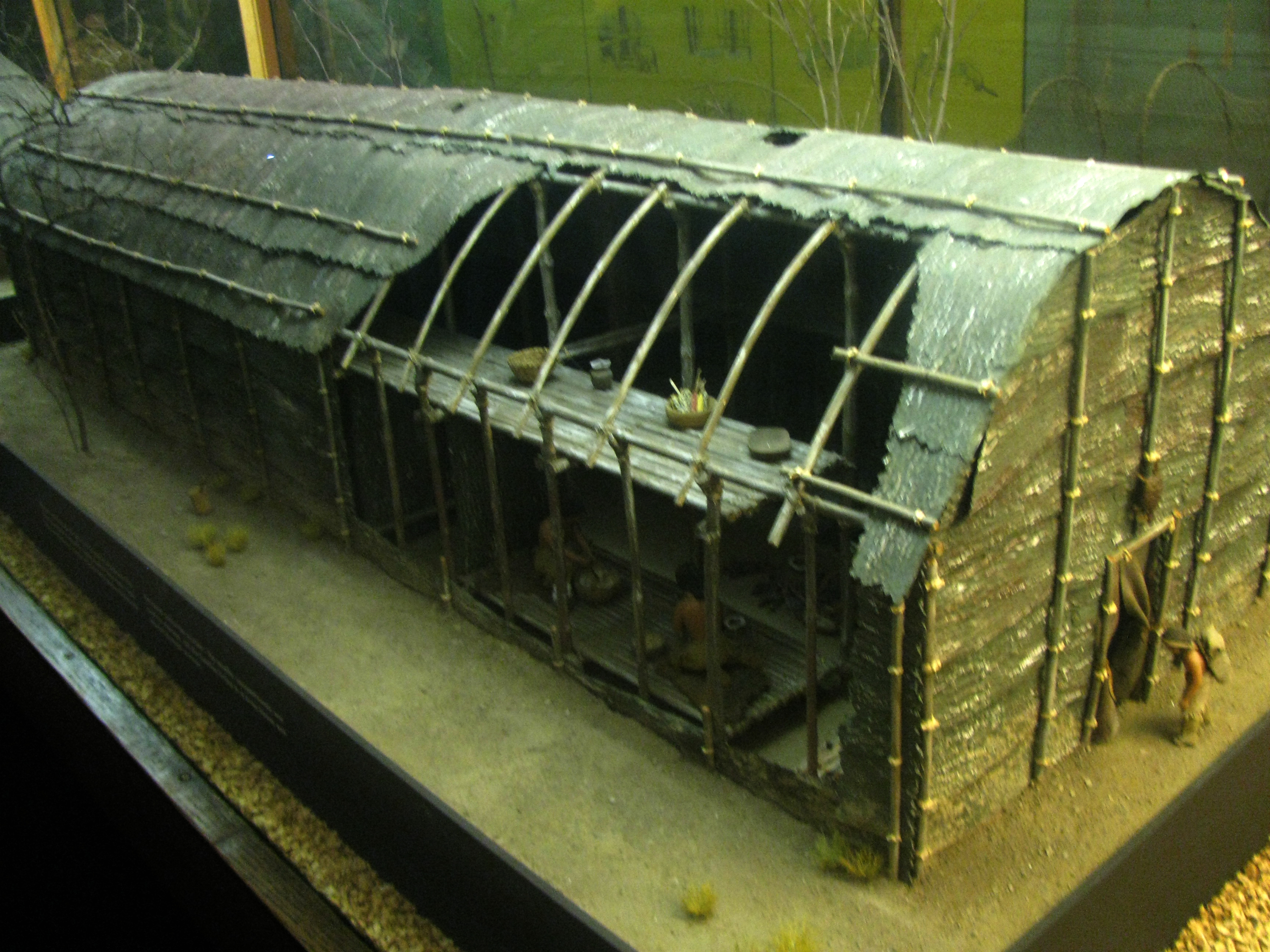
Exterior and cutaway view of an Iroquois longhouse

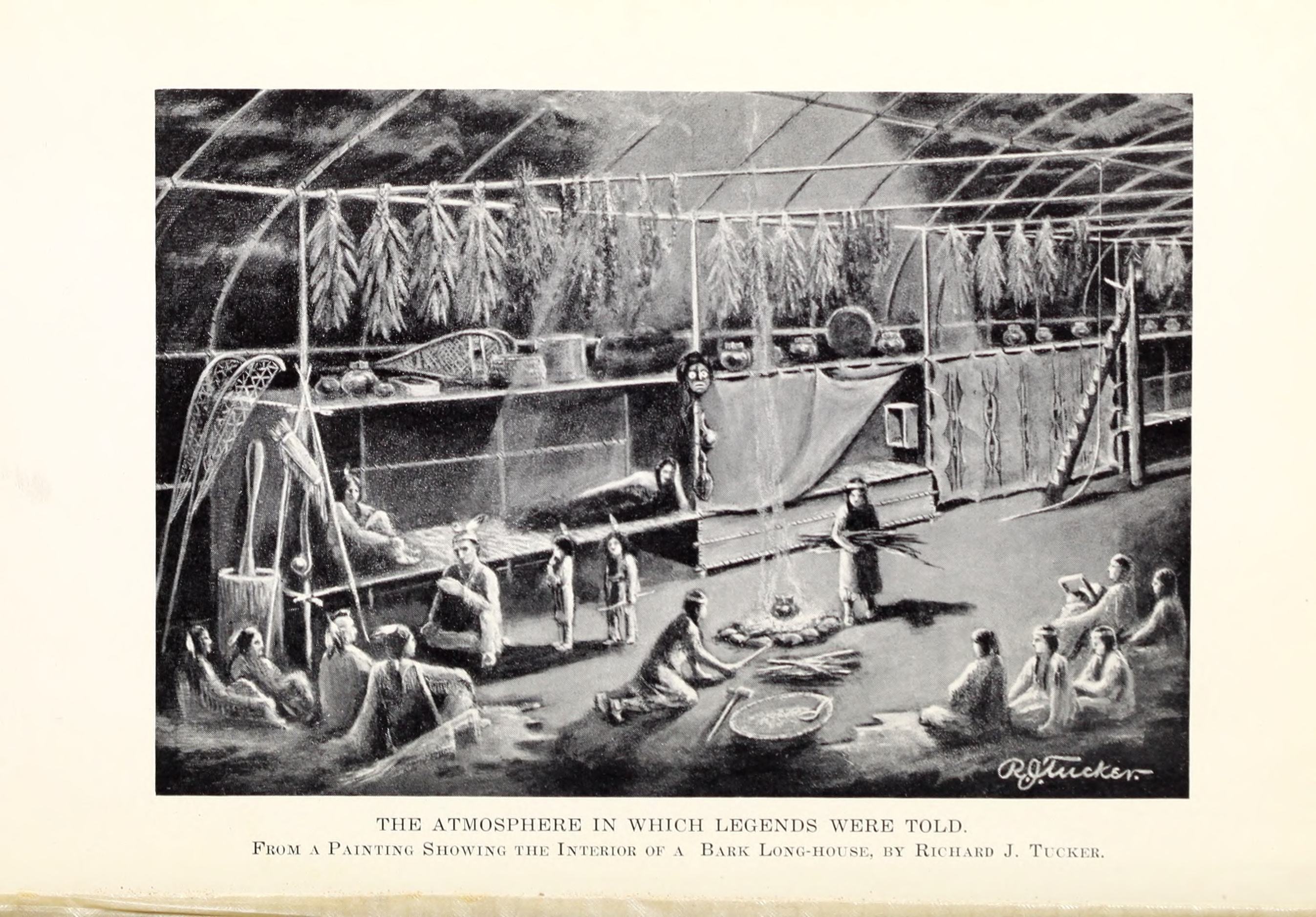
Interior of an Iroquois longhouse

In South America, the Tucano people of Colombia and northwest Brazil traditionally combine a household in a single long house. The Xingu peoples of central Brazil build a series of longhouses in circular formations forming round villages. The ancient Tupi people of the Brazilian coast used to do this as well. The Yanomami people of Brazil and Venezuela build a round hut with a thatched roof that has a hole in the middle, called a shabono, which could be considered a sort of longhouse.

== Asia ==
=== Korea ===
In Daepyeong, an archaeological site of the Mumun pottery period in Korea, longhouses have been found that date to circa 1100–850 BC. Their layout seems to be similar to those of the Iroquois. In these, several fireplaces were arranged along the longitudinal axis of the building. Later, the ancient Koreans started raising their buildings on stilts, so that the inner partitions and arrangements are somewhat obscure. The size of the buildings and their placement within the settlements may point to buildings for the nobles of their society or some sort of community or religious buildings. In Igeum-dong, an excavation site in South Korea, the large longhouses, 29 and 26 metres long, are situated between the megalithic cemetery and the rest of the settlement.

=== Taiwan ===
The longhouse may be an old building tradition among the people of Austronesian origin or intensive contact. The Austronesian language group seems to have spread to southeast Asia and the Pacific islands as well as Madagascar from the island of Taiwan. Groups like the Siraya of ancient Taiwan built longhouses and practiced head hunting, as did, for example the later Dayaks of Borneo.

=== Borneo ===
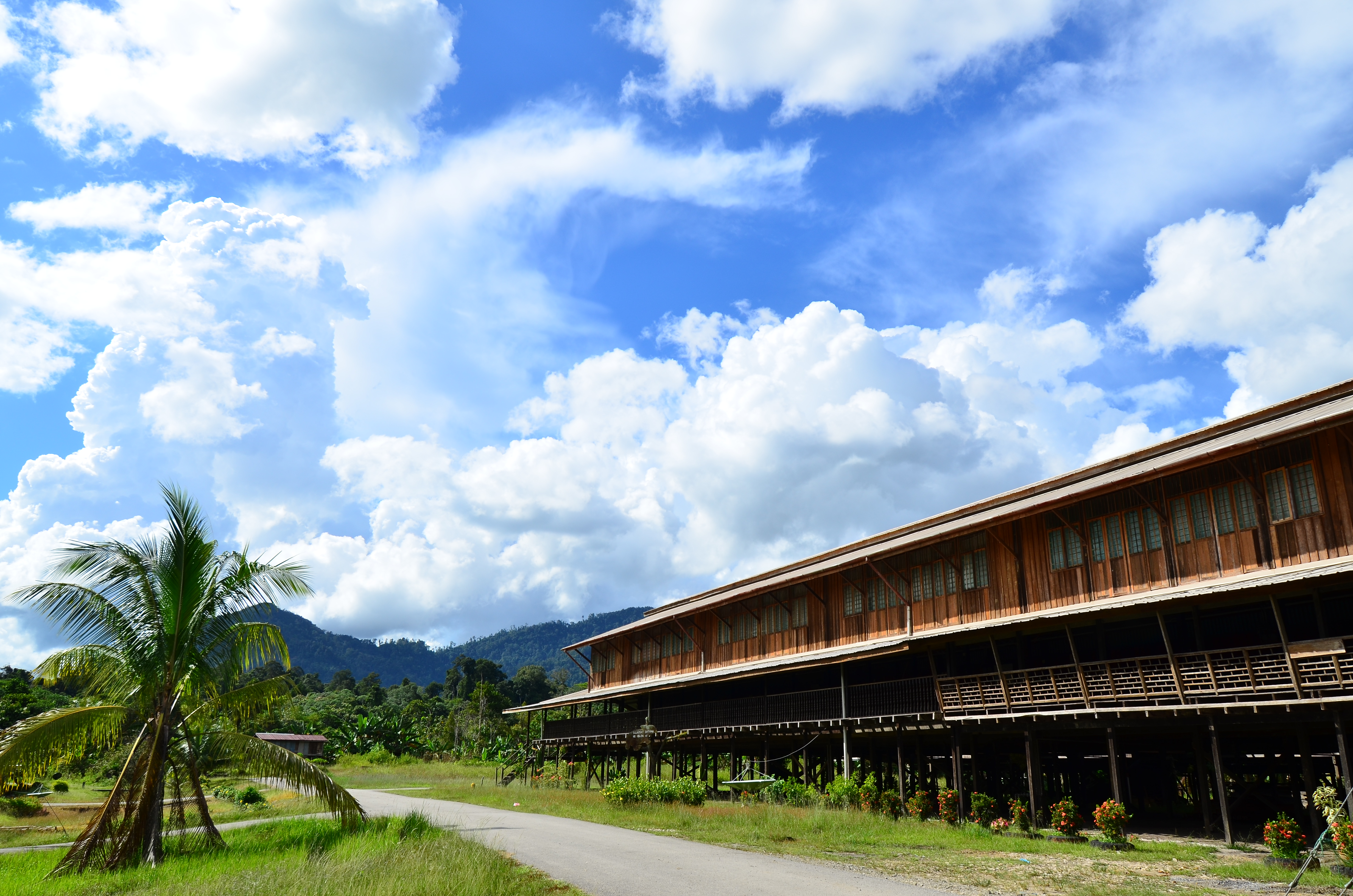
A modern timber longhouse at Sungai Asap, Belaga, Sarawak

Many of the inhabitants of the Southeast Asian island of Borneo (now Indonesian Kalimantan, East Malaysia and Brunei Darussalam), the Dayak, live traditionally in buildings known as Lamin House or longhouses: rumah betang in Indonesia (specifically the western parts of Borneo) and rumah panjang in Malay. Common to most of these is that they are built raised off the ground on stilts and are divided into a more or less public area along one side and a row of private living quarters lined along the other side. This seems to have been the way of building best accustomed to life in the jungle in the past, as otherwise hardly related people have come to build their dwellings in similar ways. One may observe similarities to South American jungle villages also living in large single structures. They are raised and built over a hill, flooding presents little inconvenience and the height acts as defence against enemy attacks. Some longhouses are quite large; up to 1152m.

The entire architecture is designed and built as a standing tree with branches to the right and left with the front part facing the sunrise while the back faces the sunset. Old longhouses in Asia were made of tree trunks as structure members, long leaves as the roof cover, split bamboo or small tree trunks as the flooring and tree bark as the wall coverings. In the past, longhouses were primarily made out of timber sourced from trees such as Eusideroxylon zwageri (Bornean ironwood) so the longhouses were able to stand firm and durable. In modern times many of the older longhouses have been replaced with buildings using more modern materials, like brick or cement, but of similar design. The longhouse building acts as the normal accommodation and a house of worship for religious activities. It is divided into several apartments (bilik) provided for every family in a single village up to three generations, these apartments are connected to a single communal ruai. The first pillar raised in construction of one apartment or tiang pemun has significance through the most senior family member as its caretaker (pun) who holds their heirlooms and which their descendants trace their ancestry via an unbroken "trunk" (tusut) lineage. The entry could double as a canoe dock. Cooling air could circulate underneath the raised floor of the dwelling, and the elevated living areas were more likely to catch above-ground breezes. Livestock could shelter underneath the longhouses for greater protection from predators and the elements. In fact, chickens coops were hung from the main room structure for easy feeding.

The longhouse acts as a domain over many families represented to which rules and prohibitions are enforced onto them by the leader or tuai; any transgressions is believed to make the community "heated" (angat) i.e. prone to disasters and calamities unless appeased or "cooled" (dichelap).

Many place names in Borneo have "Long" in their name (which means river) and most of these are or once were longhouses.

=== Siberut ===
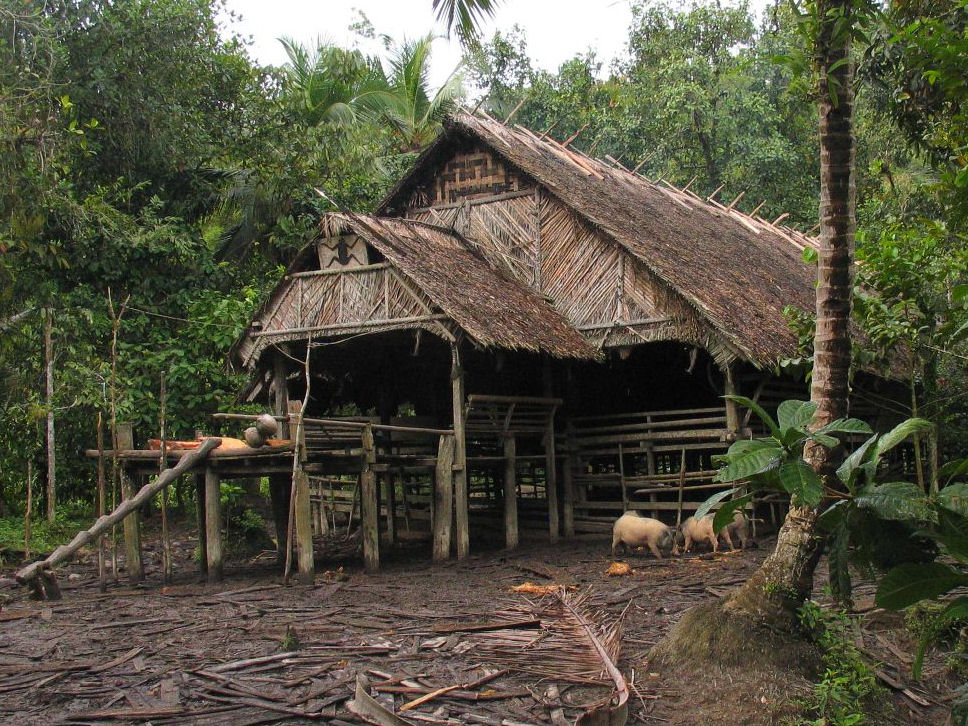
An uma, the traditional communal house of the Sakuddei on the island of Siberut, part of the Mentawai Islands

A traditional house type of the Sakuddei people, on the island of Siberut, part of the Mentawai Islands some 130 kilometres (81 mi) to the west off the coast of Sumatra (Sumatera), Indonesia is also described as a longhouse on stilts. Some five to ten families may live in each, but they are organized differently inside from those on Borneo. From front to back, such a house, called an "uma", regularly consists of an open platform serving as the main entrance place, followed by a covered gallery. The inside is divided into two rooms, one behind the other. On the back there is another platform. The whole building is raised on short stilts about half a metre off the ground. The front platform is used for general activities while the covered gallery is the favorite place for the men to host guests, and where the men usually sleep. The following first room is entered by a door and contains a central communal hearth and a place for dancing. There are also places for religious and ritual objects and activities. In the adjoining room the women and their small children as well as unmarried daughters sleep, usually in compartments divided into families. The platform on the back is used by the women for their everyday activities. Visiting women usually enter the house here.

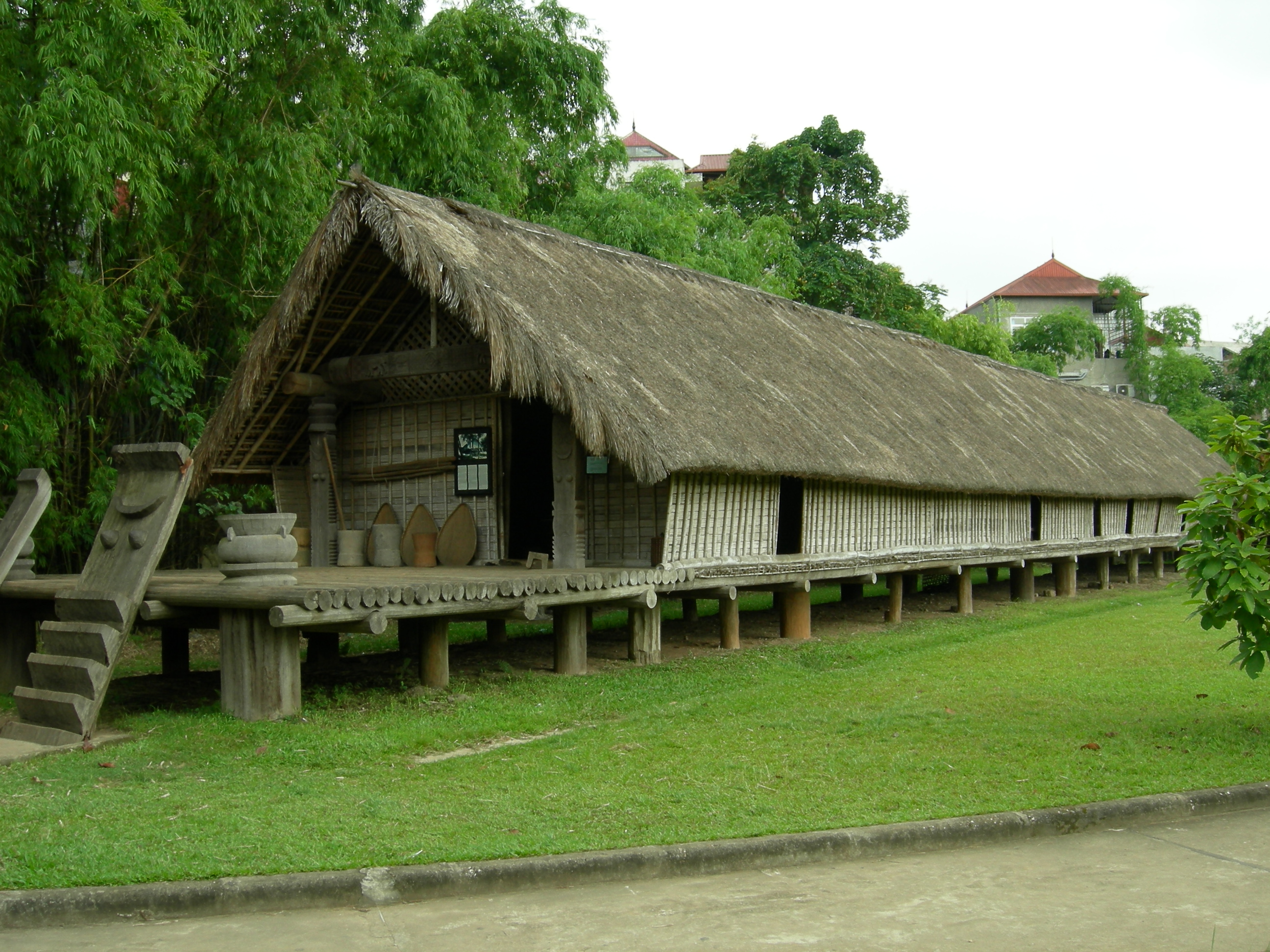
Recreation of a Rade longhouse, as seen in the Vietnam Museum of Ethnology

=== Vietnam ===
The Mnong and Rade of Vietnam also have a tradition of building longhouses (Vietnamese: nhà dài) that are often 30 to 40 metres (98 to 131 ft) long. In contrast to the jungle versions of Borneo these sport shorter stilts and seem to use a veranda in front of a short (gable) side as main entrance.

=== Nepal ===
The Rana Tharu is an ethnic group indigenous to the western Terai of Nepal. Most of them prefer living in longhouses called Badaghar with big families of many generations, sometimes 40–50 people. All household members pool their labor force, contribute their income, share the expenditure and use one kitchen. Traditionally, their houses are built entirely using natural materials such as reed poles for walls and thatch for roofing.

== See also ==
- Housebarn or Byre-dwelling, a related structure
- Indigenous architecture
- Igloo
- Tipi
- Wigwam
- Nakamal, a similar building built by communities in Vanuatu
- Wharenui, a similar structure built by the Māori people of New Zealand
- Dorset culture, a Paleo-Eskimo culture that also built longhouses
- Kampong (village)
- Vernacular architecture

== Bibliography ==
For the longhouses in Sarawak on Borneo, these books were used as sources, among others:

- Morrison, Hedda. [1962] (Fifth impression 1974). Life in a Longhouse – Borneo Literature Bureau Kuching, Sarawak, Malaysia. Printed in Hong Kong by Dai Nippon Printing Co. (Int.) Ltd. – with translations to Malay, Iban and Chinese (Pendiau Dirumah Panjai – Kehidupan Di-Rumah Panjang).
  - Short introduction text followed by the photo section (ca. 170) with quite detailed descriptions to each photo in the four languages.
- Dickson, M.G. [1962] (Third edition (revised) 1968). Sarawak and its People – Borneo Literature Bureau. Printed in Hong Kong by Dai Nippon Printing Co. (Int.) Ltd.
  - Basic school book keeping the language simple and explaining things so children unaware of the world outside of their village can easily understand. Yet, as school books often are, very rich in information. On page 100 is a drawing of a longhouse (cut open) with a detailed description. Some of the photos are from Hedda Morrison; see her book Life in a Longhouse.
