= Daepyeong =

Archaeological site in South Gyeongsang Province, South Korea

Coordinates: 35°13′25″N 127°57′45″E

- Hangul: 대평 유적
- Hanja: 大坪 遺蹟
- RR: Daepyeong yujeok
- MR: Taep'yŏng yujŏk

Daepyeong is a complex prehistoric archaeological site located in the Nam River valley near Jinju in South Gyeongsang Province, South Korea. Pottery typologies and seriations and a host of AMS radiocarbon dates show that the site had a number of occupations over several millennia from c. 3500 BC - AD 500.

This site is very important in Korean and world prehistory because of the many important finds including one of the earliest ditch-enclosed settlements in East Asia, substantial prehistoric dry-fields, a multiple ditch-enclosed residential and production precinct for emerging elites, and the earliest evidence of craft specialization (greenstone or 'jade' ornaments) in prehistoric Korea, well-preserved evidence of other production activities including pottery-making. Several small-scale excavations took place beginning in 1977. Wide-scope, large-scale excavation of Daepyeong and surrounding settlements took place between 1996 and 2000.

== Environment and geography of Daepyeong ==
Prehistoric Daepyeong incorporates in area formed by the curves of the Nam River in a single area of several small, linked alluvial plains that are semi-circumscribed by steep hills of 100–1100 metres. In the north, Daepyeong includes Sonam-ni and Eoeun, and in the south Okbang and Sangchon-ni are included. Eoeun and Okbang make up the central area and are partially protected by a natural levee formed by terracing and changes in the flow of the Nam River.

== Jeulmun Pottery Period (c. 3500-1500 B.C.) ==
Jeulmun pottery sherds are found in light numbers throughout the area, indicating that occupation began at least from the Middle Jeulmun Pottery Period. A settlement with a number of pit-houses dating to the latter part of the Middle Jeulmun was excavated at Sangchon-ni. At the same site charred human skeletal remains were discovered in the corner of a pit-house inside a large vessel apparently used as a burial urn. Additionally, there is evidence of a shallow ditch feature that may represent one of the first ditch-enclosed features in East Asian prehistory. Some carbonized seeds found in association with the pit-houses appear to show that Jeulmun people were engaged in small-scale cultivation.

== Early Mumun Pottery Period (c. 1500-850 B.C.) ==
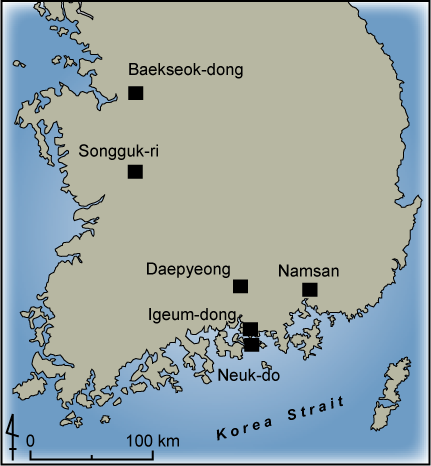
The Daepyeong site and other settlement sites of the Mumun Period

Settlement in the Incipient and Early Mumun Pottery Period I was sparse and concentrated in Eoeun. The same area was the location for a settlement of narrow rectangular pit-houses with plans that are not unlike those of the Huron and Iroquoian longhouses of Southern Ontario, Canada. For example, these pit-houses had a series of 2 - 4 hearths lined down the middle of the structure, indicating that the occupants were likely members of an extended, multi-generational household. Several small hamlets and/or farmsteads were dispersed in and around the main Daepyeong settlement at Eoeun in areas such as Sonam-ni, Okbang, and Sangchon-ni.

== Middle Mumun Pottery Period (c. 850-550 B.C.) ==
Daepyeong became a large central settlement in the Early Middle Mumun (c. 850-700 BC). The focus of the settlement was a large nucleated group of 144 pit-houses in Eoeun. Another nucleated settlement of 115 pit-houses developed in Okbang at about the same time. Archaeological evidence from the Middle Mumun indicates that prominent individuals in Eoeun and Okbang probably competed for dominance in the local area. For example, greenstone production and distribution began in Eoeun and was traded to Okbang and areas outside of Daepyeong. Many ditches and ditch-enclosures appeared in Eoeun and Okbang beginning in the Early Middle Mumun. Perhaps this was due to conflict between Okbang and Eoeun, or the whole of Daepyeong with distant outside settlements. Eventually, 8 substantial ditch-and-palisades were constructed at Okbang. This sub-period sees a pattern in which greenstone artifacts that are made in Eoeun are consumed by those who are buried in the ditch-and-palisade precinct of Okbang.

Archaeologists think that the dry-fields recovered in large-scale excavations most likely date to the Early Middle Mumun. Bale and Ko note that more than 32,000 square metres of dry-fields were recovered at Daepyeong in wide-scope, clearing horizontal excavations. Through detailed and long-term archaeobotanical research, Crawford and Lee of the University of Toronto, Canada discovered the people of Daepyeong had multiple cropping agricultural systems in place even in the Early Mumun.

== Late Mumun, Protohistoric, and Korean Three Kingdoms (c. 550 BC - AD 668) ==
Daepyeong was an important settlement in the Mumun economic system, but as with many simple chiefdoms, it began to decline and then collapsed. The area was likely depopulated at the end of the Late Middle Mumun, c. 550-500 BC. Sangchon-ni may have had an ephemeral Late Mumun occupation, and settlements such as Naechon-ni (DAUM 2001a) appeared in the Korean Proto-historic (c. 300 BC - AD 300/400). Additionally, dry-fields dating to the early Korean Three Kingdoms period have been excavated in Okbang. The area was a part of the Gaya Confederacy during this period, and was later absorbed into the Silla state.

== Importance ==
Daepyeong, a large, complex, and economically important settlement with multiple chronological components, is important for those trying to understand the secondary origins of agriculture in East Asia, the development of complex hunter-gatherers, nucleated settlements, intensive agriculture, incipient social ranking, and simple chiefdoms. This site is on the same scale of archaeological importance as Yoshinogari and Sannai-Maruyama in Japan, and Banpo and Jiangzhai of the Early Chinese Neolithic.

== See also ==
- Prehistory of Korea
- Bronze Age
- Liaoning bronze dagger culture
- Megalithic tomb
- Igeum-dong site
