= Yoshinogari site =

Prehistoric site in Japan

Yoshinogari Site
- 吉野ヶ里 遺跡 (Japanese)
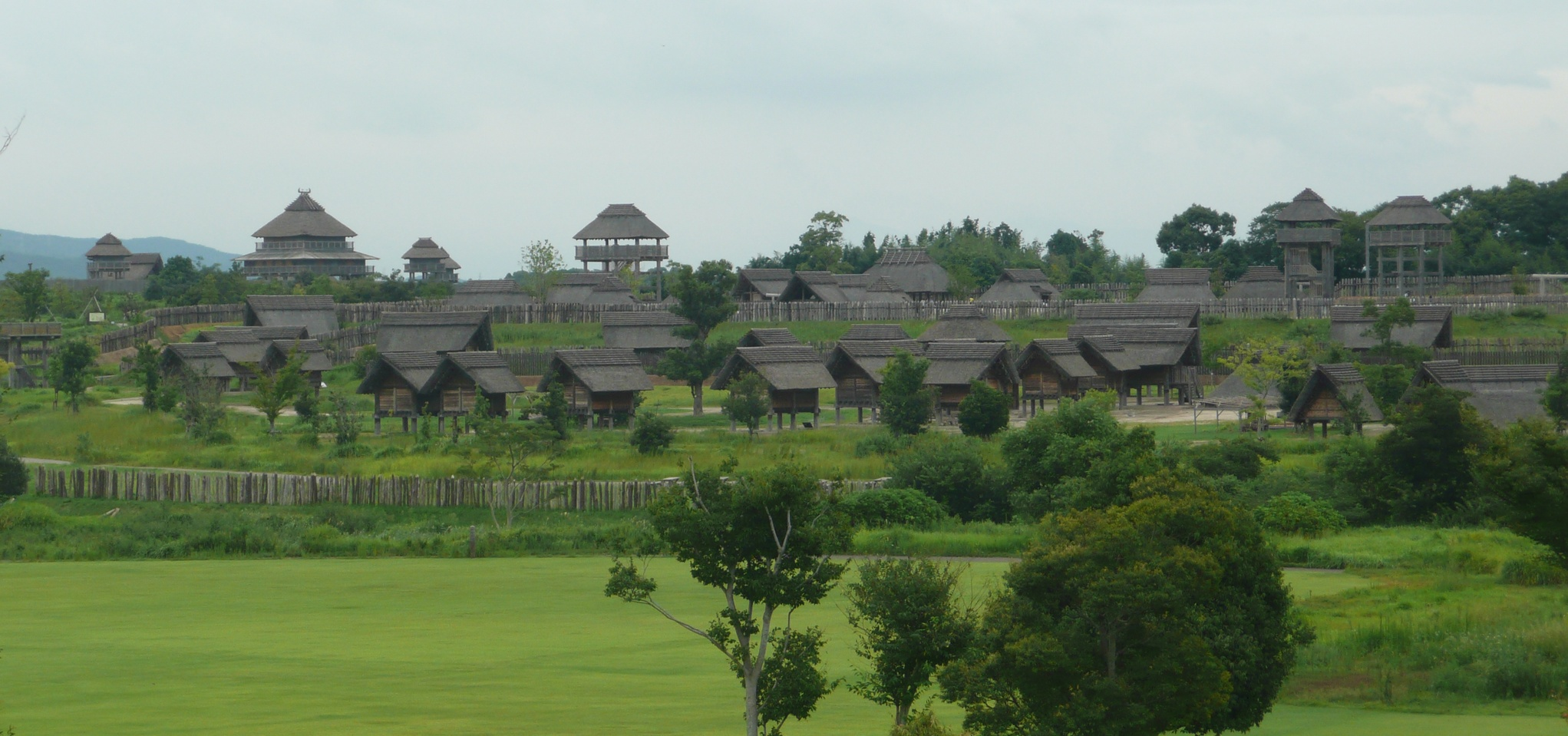
- Reconstructed Yayoi raised-floor buildings at Yoshinogari

- Yoshinogari Yoshinogari site (Japan)
- 33°19′25″N 130°23′26.5″E
- Type: Settlement trace
- Periods: Yayoi period
- Location: Kanzaki - Yoshinogari, Saga, Japan
- Region: Kyushu region

Site notes
- Area: 36 ha (89 acres)
- Excavation dates: 1986-present
- Public access: Yes (park, museum)
- National Special Historic Site of Japan Important Cultural Property

Yoshinogari (吉野ヶ里 遺跡, Yoshinogari iseki) is a large and complex Yayoi period archaeological site located in the town of Yoshinogari and city of Kanzaki in Saga Prefecture, Kyūshū, Japan. According to the Yayoi chronology established by pottery seriations in the 20th century, Yoshinogari dates back to between the 3rd century BC and the 3rd century AD. However, recent attempts to use absolute dating methods such as AMS radiocarbon dating have shown that the earliest Yayoi component of Yoshinogari dates back to before 400 BC.

== Overview ==
The Yoshinogari site is located in eastern Saga Prefecture, with its northern tip at an elevation of around 1,000 meters, transitions to the hilly area at the southern foot of the Sefuri Mountains, the Saga Plain, and the Ariake Sea, gradually lowering in elevation and opening up to the south. During the late Yayoi period, a double moat, consisting of an outer and inner moat, was built. The deep, V-shaped outer moat, measuring approximately 2.5 kilometers in length, encompassed an area of approximately 40 hectares. The moat was fenced with wooden fences, earthen ramparts, and abatis to prevent enemy intrusion. Additionally, several watchtowers were placed within the moat for guarding and intimidating purposes. There are two inner moats within the larger outer moat, with buildings clustered within them. The northern settlement is named the North Inner Bloc, and the southern settlement the South Inner Bloc. Remains of buildings have been discovered both inside and outside the Inner Bloc. Pit dwellings and raised-floor buildings are thought to have been the residences of those involved in rituals and their entourage, and have been found within the inner bloc, along with the main altar, east altar, and shrine where rituals were held. Archaeological excavations have also uncovered raised-floor warehouses for storing food, storage pits, pits, and remains of bronze tool manufacturing.

The jar coffins, stone coffins, and pit tombs, where many bodies were buried together, are thought to be a communal cemetery for ordinary people such as residents and soldiers. Meanwhile, two burial mounds (named the "North Burial Mound" and "South Burial Mound," respectively) are located in the southern and northern parts of the site, and are thought to be the tombs of village chiefs and others. Among the human bones excavated in the jar coffins were some with injuries, arrowheads still lodged in them, and some missing above the head, demonstrating the ferocity of the battles reminiscent of the Great War of Wa. Many of the remains were also found buried with ornaments such as glass tubular beads. Bronze mirrors from China, Japanese-style bronze mirrors, bronze daggers, coins, bells, and halberds, iron tools, wooden tools, prehistoric human hair, and many other artifacts have been unearthed from Yoshinogari features. The remains and artifacts excavated share characteristics with those found in northern Kyushu and other parts of Japan, and also share various similarities with those found in mainland China, the Korean Peninsula, and the Ryukyu Islands. This archaeological site is of great importance in Japanese and world prehistory because of the massive size and important nature of the settlement and the artifacts found there.

Numerous examples of Yayoi pottery, stoneware, bronze, ironware, and woodware have been excavated. These include accessories such as magatama and tubular beads, bronze swords, bronze mirrors, textiles, and cloth products, as well as decorative and ritual items. In 1998, a bronze dōtaku was discovered near the site. Additionally, the three Zenpō-kōhō-fun keyhole-shaped tombs within the ruins are thought to have been built on the site after the Yayoi period settlement had disappeared.

== History ==
=== Pre-Yayoi period ===
Knife-shaped stone tools, trapezoidal stone tools, and projectile points from the Japanese Paleolithic period have been excavated from the Yoshinogari Hills, indicating human settlement in this area for many thousands of years. Jōmon pottery fragments from the Late Jōmon period have also been discovered. The main reason for this is thought to be the region's proximity to the sea. Following the end of the last ice age and a warmer climate in the Early Jōmon period, sea levels rose, an event known as the Jōmon Transgression. The Ariake Sea (now approximately 12 kilometers away) is estimated to have extended to the southern end of the Yoshinogari Hills, approximately two kilometers from the site. The Ariake Sea has a large tidal range, averaging five to six meters, and shallow tidal flats. It is believed that favorable conditions, such as these tidal ranges, excellent water transportation using rivers like the Chikugo River, and an abundant supply of food like shellfish and crabs, led to the region's initial settlement.

=== Early Yayoi Period ===
The earliest component of the Yoshinogari settlement formed at the southern end of the low hill extending out from the Sefuri Mountains. The earliest settlement was about three hectares in area and contained a ditch-enclosure. A small number of pit dwellings, prehistoric storage pits, and burial jars dating to this sub-period have been excavated (SPBE 2000).

=== Middle Yayoi period ===
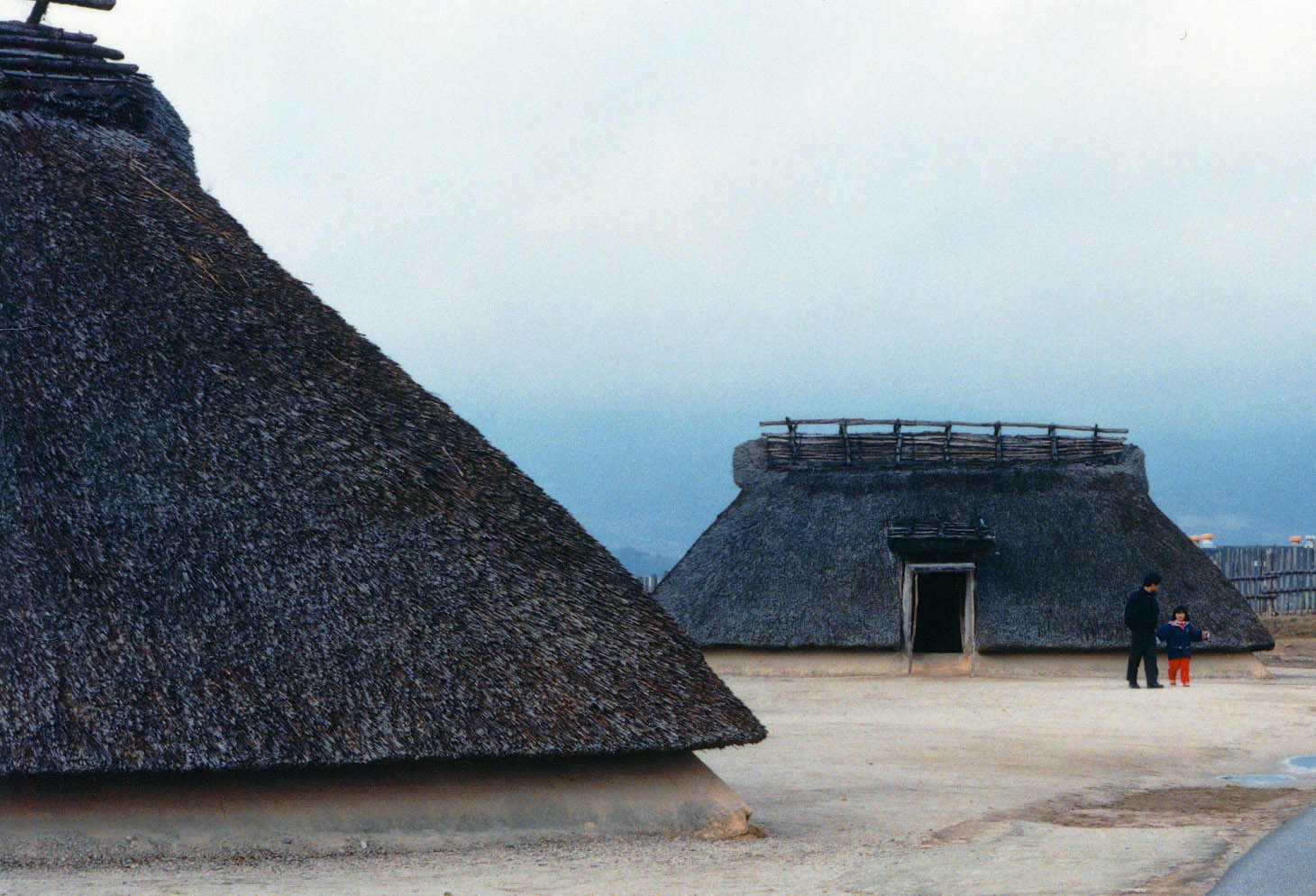
Reconstructed dwellings.

During the middle Yayoi period, moats appeared encircling the Yoshinogari hills. As settlements developed, defenses became more stringent. Furthermore, burial mounds and jar coffins became increasingly common. Larger burial mounds were estimated to be nearly rectangular, measuring approximately 46 meters north to south and 27 meters east to west, and over 4.5 meters in height. Some burial mounds contained pits dug at the top and contained more than 14 jar coffins, a pattern not found anywhere else in Honshu. Some of the burial mounds contained cylindrical jade-like glass ornaments from China and bronze daggers from the Korean Peninsula. The burial mounds were located in an area away from the majority of burials, confirming the thoughts some archaeologists that those interred in the burial mound were the leaders of Yoshinogari (Barnes 1993:220-221; Imamura 1996:182; SPBE 2000). More than 2000 burial jars dating to this period have come to light, both inside and outside of ditched areas. Many of these burials were laid out in a long row, some hundreds of metres long, parallel with the length of the low hill in the middle of the site. Artifacts excavated from the Middle Yayoi burials indicate the presence of some status distinctions.

Large wooden raised-floor granaries appeared at the end of this sub-period in the middle and southern ends of the site (SPBE 2000). An area of the Middle Yayoi settlement seems to have been dedicated to the casting of bronze implements due to the number of moulds for dōtaku which were found. In the same area, pottery that was common in the Chinese continent and Korean peninsula during the same period was excavated there as well. This has led some Japanese archaeologists to propose that Middle Yayoi interaction with China was related to bronze-casting.

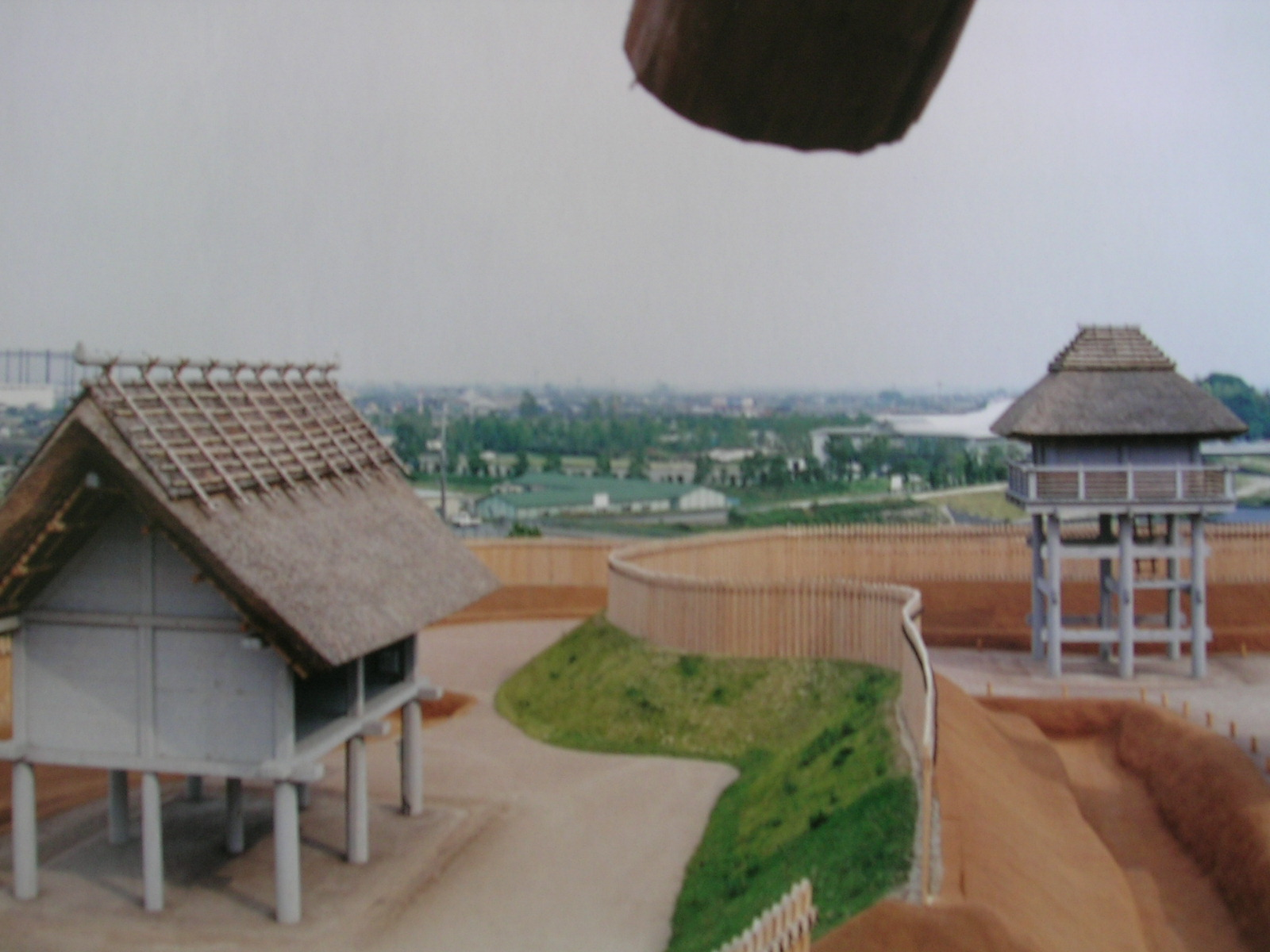
Northern Enclosure showing reconstructed Late Yayoi raised-floor buildings, ditches, and palisades at Yoshinogari

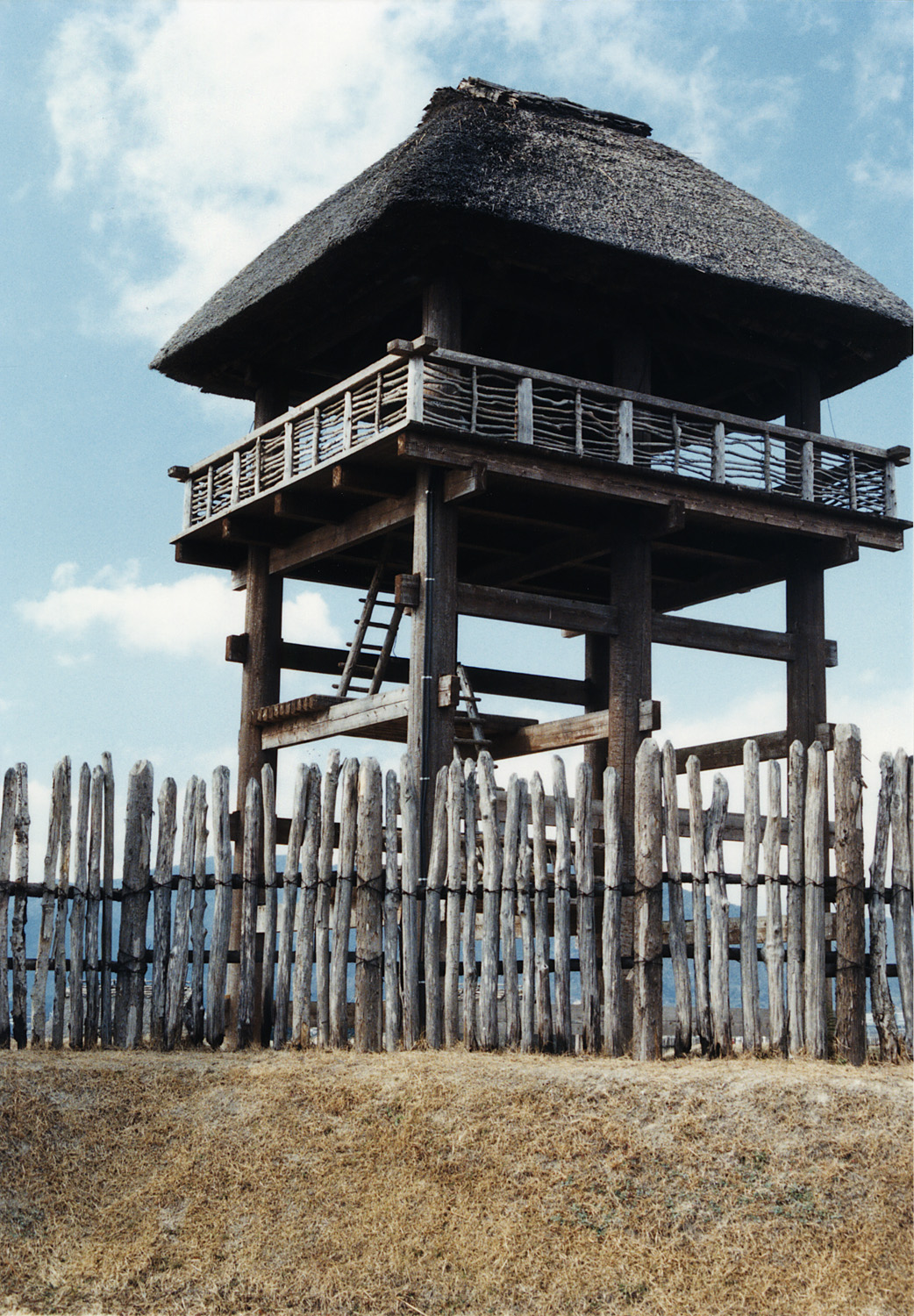
Reconstructed Yayoi raised-floor building (watchtower?), Yoshinogari

=== Late Yayoi period ===
During the later Yayoi period, moats expanded and doubled, and buildings grew larger. The settlement reached its peak around the 3rd century. Two inner enclosures, the North and South, were built, marking a period of cultural development. Based on the number of earthenware coffins, it is estimated that there were approximately 1,200 people living there, with the entire region centered around Yoshinogari numbering around 5,400.

A large outer ditch was built around the edges of the low hill, completely surrounding the settlement and cemetery areas. Inside of the outer ditch, smaller ditch-enclosed precincts were built that surrounded groups of pit-houses and raised-floor buildings. The ditches of the inner precincts of the Late Yayoi were undoubtedly meant for defence based on the evidence of post-moulds indicating palisades on the inside of the ditches. Indeed, the so-called "Northern Inner Enclosure" was surrounded by double ditches (SPBE 2000). Some of the raised-floor buildings of this sub-period were quite tall and large. For example, the largest raised floor building was square in shape (12.5 X 12.5 m) with post-moulds that were 40–50 cm in diameter (SPBE 2000). Raised-floor buildings are known from large Jōmon period sites in Japan such as Sannai-Maruyama Site.

The coastline gradually receded, and by this time it was located two to three kilometers from the Yoshinogari ruins. The mouth of the Chikugo River is also believed to have moved to this area, and archaeological remains suggest that there was a port-like structure there. The Yoshinogari Hills are thought to have had contact with this port through the Shirohara River and Tade River (both tributaries of the Chikugo River) that flow along both the east and west banks.

=== Kofun Period and later ===
With the beginning of the Kofun period, the moat at Yoshinogari Ruins was filled with large amounts of discarded Yayoi pottery. The settlement almost completely disappeared and dispersed. This process was also seen in moated settlements throughout the Kinki region and elsewhere. Highland settlements also disappeared. This was because following the Civil War of Wa there was no longer a need for defensive structures such as moats and earthworks, or for highland settlements. During the Kofun period, the number of dwellings at Yoshinogari drastically decreased, and the hilltops were used as cemeteries, with keyhole-shaped burial mounds started being built. People were able to develop the low-lying marshes into rice paddies and began to base their lives on the plains.

During the Nara and Heian periods, it is believed that kanga complex for Kanzaki County was located on the site. This was an administrative complex of the centralized government under the Ritsuryō system, which standardized rule over the provinces was under a kokufu (provincial capital), and each province was divided into smaller administrative districts, known as (郡, gun, kōri), composed of 2–20 townships in 715 AD. Each of the units had an administrative complex, or kanga (官衙遺跡) built on a semi-standardized layout based on contemporary Chinese design. Also during the Ritsuryō period, the land division system was called the jori system, and the borders of ancient land division and ancient roads can still be discerned in the local landscape.

The Yoshinogari area was the site of the Saga Rebellion in the early Meiji period. In the twentieth century, artifacts such as pottery began to be unearthed, but the site remained unknown and unprotected. Consequently portions were destroyed in the 1970s for the creation of farmland and orchards and soil mining. The area was also considered a candidate site for a prefectural high school and an industrial park in the 1980s; but the widespread excavation of artifacts meant the plan was abandoned. Preliminary surveys for cultural heritage excavation began in 1983. A full-scale archaeological excavation began in 1986 and is still ongoing. It was subsequently designated a National Historic Site in May 1990, elevated to a Special National Historic Site in April 1991. The area under protection was expanded in 1999. It was listed as one of Japan's Top 100 Castles by the Japan Castle Foundation in 2006.

At present, 117 hectares of the site has been developed into the Yoshinogari Historical Park, with completed excavation sites backfilled for preservation, and recreated moats, pit dwellings, raised-floor buildings, watchtowers, fences, abatis, raised-floor storehouses, and burial mounds constructed, but not always on their original locations. Many of the excavated artifacts are stored and exhibited in several facilities within the park.

== Historical controversy ==
The discovery and subsequent excavation of Yoshinogari caused a sustained sensation in the Japanese media in the late 1980s and early 1990s. The attention given to this site soon centred upon intense speculation that Yoshinogari could have been the capital of Yamatai, a polity mentioned in Chinese historical texts such as Weizhi and Houhanshu. Yamatai is assumed to have had implications for the formation of state-level society in the Kofun period. This issue remains controversial. However, most archaeologists state that there is no direct link between Yoshinogari and Yamatai (Barnes 1993; Yoshinogari 2001).

== Cultural Properties ==
=== Important Cultural Properties ===
- Artifacts excavated from the Yoshinogari Ruins (佐賀県吉野ヶ里遺跡墳丘墓出土品), Yayoi period; In 1991, a number of artifacts recovered from the Yoshinogari Site were collectively designated a National Important Cultural Property. These include:
- 5 thin bronze swords (with one pommel)
- 1 copper pommel
- 79 glass tube beads
- 7 bronze mirror fragments
- 1 thin bronze sword fragment
- 1 thin bronze spear mold fragment
- 2 thin bronze sword mold fragments
- 1 comma-shaped bronze vessel mold fragment
- 1 bronze vessel mold fragment
- 1 tin ingot

== See also ==
- Yayoi period
- Book of Later Han - Hou han shu
- Yamataikoku
- Saga Prefecture
- Daepyeong, a similar site in the Korean peninsula
- Igeum-dong site, a similar site in the Korean peninsula
- Mumun pottery period, the archaeological period in Korea that is contemporaneous with Final Jōmon and Early Yayoi
- List of Special Places of Scenic Beauty, Special Historic Sites and Special Natural Monuments
