= Longère =

Type of longhouse typical of Brittany and Normandy in France

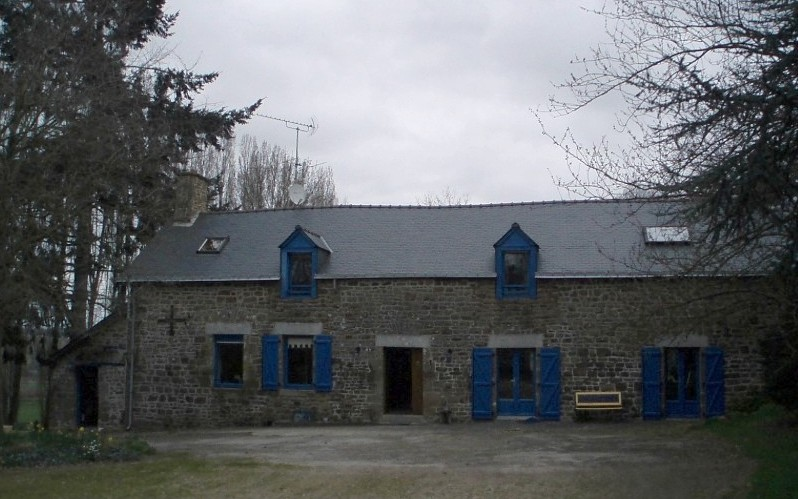
Longère in Ernée, Mayenne, France (2006)

A longère (Breton: ti-hir) is a type of longhouse typical of the regions of Brittany and Normandy in northwestern France. It is a long, narrow dwelling, developing along the axis of its peak, typically inhabited by farmers and artisans.

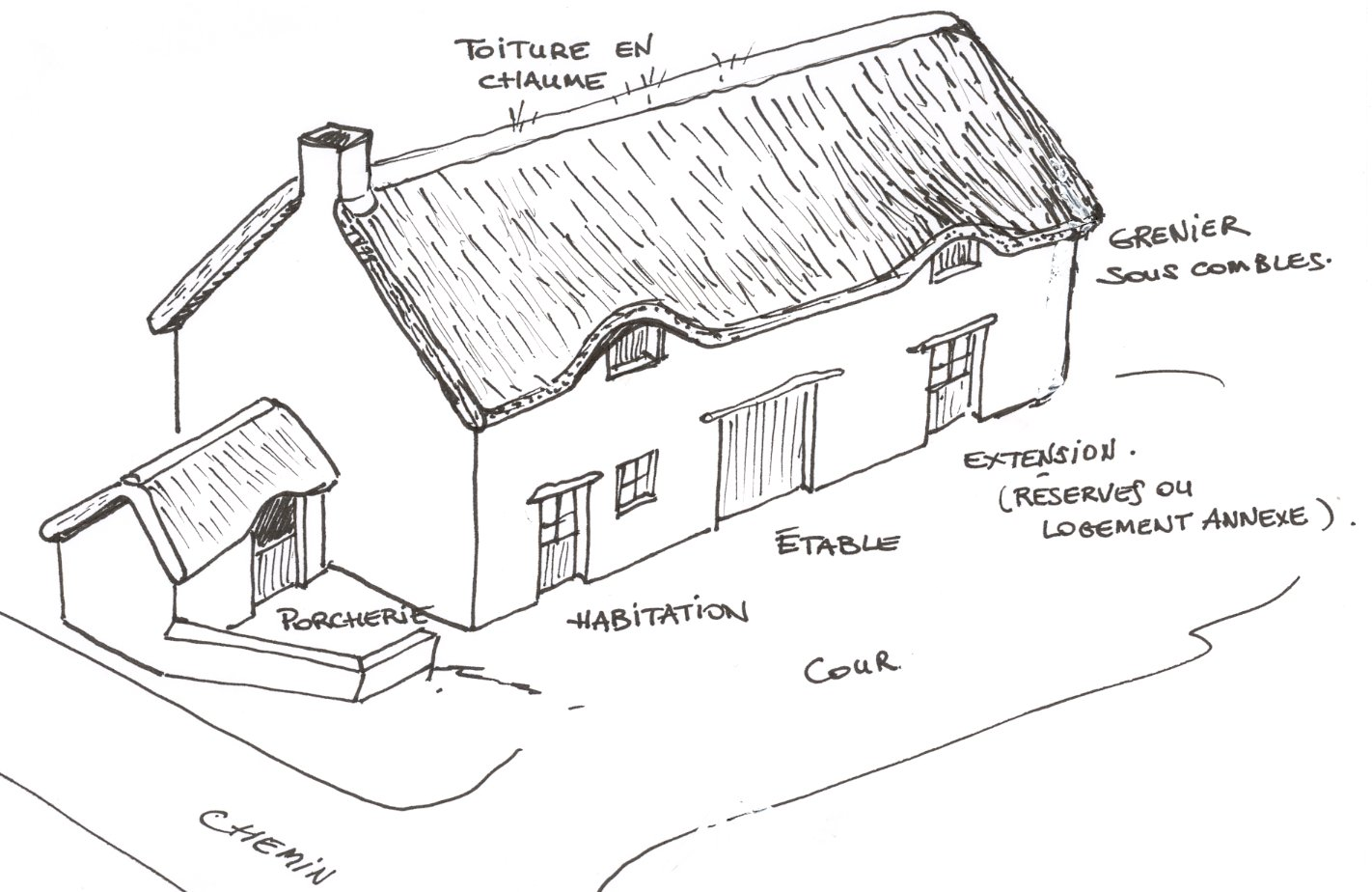
Sketch of a longère north of Guérande en Loire-Atlantique) (2007)

Longère also means a "long wall" or "gutter wall" of a building, whether for a church or house, in Lower Brittany.

== See also ==
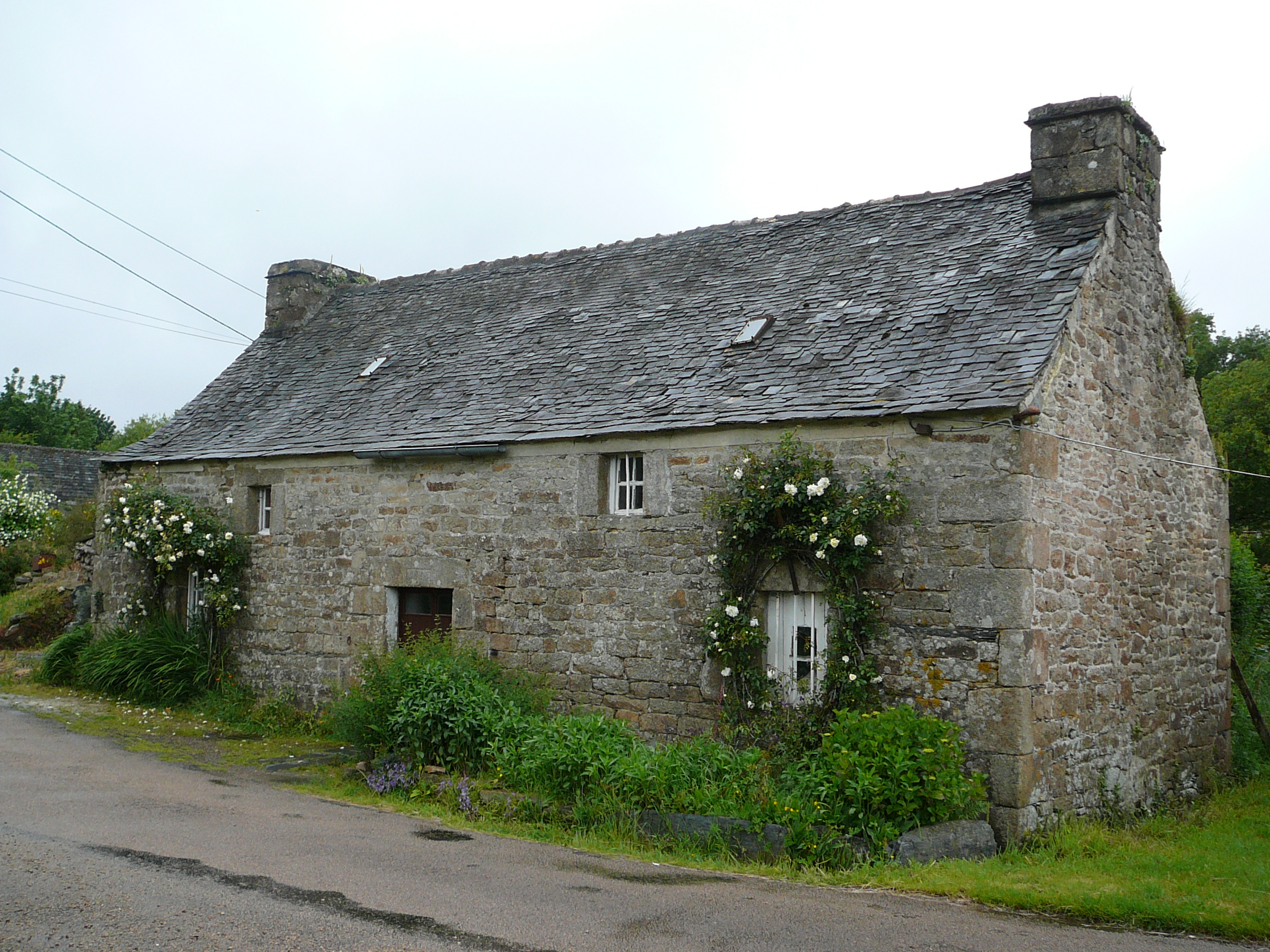
Longère à Botmeur (Finistère) (Monts d'Arrée, Lower Normandy) (2006)

- Quistinic
- Manoir de Mézarnou
- Moulin d'Olivet
