= Manoir de Mézarnou =

Coordinates: 48°30′40″N 4°13′8″W

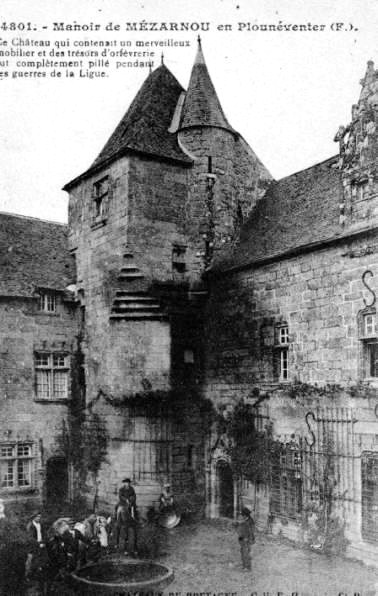
The Manoir de Mézarnou in the town of Plounéventer, France.

The Manoir de Mézarnou (Breton: Maner Mézarnou) is a fortified 16th century manor-house located in the Finistère département of Brittany in northwestern France. It is located in the small rural town of Plounéventer, near Landivisiau. It was erected by Yves de Parcevaux, who reorganised the domaine between 1571 and 1591.

== History ==
The manor of Mézarnou was built on the site of an old medieval building, property in 1091, of Pierre André de Parcevaux, husband of Sybille de Trogoff. In 1145, Ollivier de Parcevaux donated to the abbey of Relecq. In 1250, Pierre de Parcevaux accompanied sire de Chateaubriand to the Holy Land with King Louis and the Duke of Brittany during the Seventh Crusade. In 1297, Pierre de Parcevaux was on the council of the Duke of Brittany. In 1393, Tanguy de Parcevaux married Odile de Kerlouan. The son of the latter, Allain, was secretary of John V of Brittany.

The building was rebuilt in the sixteenth century by Yves de Parcevaux, lord of Prat-Hir (son of Maurice and the grandson of Allain) and Jeanne de Bouteville, his wife (married on 20 March 1554). The château (owned by Hervé de Parcevaux) was looted in 1594 by Yves Du Liscouët (one of the notorious chiefs of the royalist party during the troubles of the Holy League), then visited the following year by Guy Éder de La Fontenelle who kidnaps and marries Marie Le Chevoir (daughter of a first marriage of Renée Coëtlogon, wife of Hervé de Parcevaux). The chapel was once located 100m to the south, near the manor's former entrance, at a place called "Park ar Japel" It has disappeared along with the dovecote, which was reported in the sale of 1720 to Marshal Poinçonneau.

After the French Revolution, Mézarnou is sold as national property and the farm was bought by Bonaventure Ollivier. The family Abhervé-Guegen becomes owner of Mézarnou in 1806, passing by marriage into the hands of the Martin family. In 1985, part of Mézarnou belongs to the Martin family, the other part, since 1960, belongs to Louis Appéré (formerly the family Jaffrès). In 1995, Mézarnou was shared between three owners (the Society of History and Archeology, Joseph Le Goff and Roger Aballain).

== Architecture ==
Mézarnou was built according to the invariable plan of old Breton manors. A rectangular closed courtyard with the main edifice at the far end, on either side two longères of service buildings (the one on the right now ruined) and in front a wall more or less fortified and pierced with two unequal doors (now ruined), the cart entrance and pedestrian door. This wall, of a thickness of 1.50m, bore a gallery on corbelled constructions to which one attained access by a passage from the first floor of the defensive tower. Defence was assured by this small tower with loopholes.

Manor-type of the floral gothic style, sometimes called the Queen Anne style, Mézarnou is still composed of two main buildings (corps de logis) joining at right angles, the remains of the tower that defended the gate and a portion of the wall closing the cour d’honneur. Of this (wall section) remains a wall end all the way up to the right-hand foot of a doorway, without a doubt the pedestrian door, since this is the usual arrangement in Léon.

The corps de logis which contains the remains of the lower-hall and upper-hall, also has a large Gothic dormer window, made of stone lacing, with a double projection of formed crockets, creeping foliages, and grotesques on a high roofing of the era. Its pediment with pinnacles is stamped with four escutcheons.

There is a large square pavilion - at the angle between the two wings - that contains the staircase. It is flanked by a lookout turret on corbel-brackets. With monolithic steps of two metres in length, this staircase ends at the second floor by a slender column of two finely chiselled châpiteaux (capitals) from which rise up, as a sun, the wide slabs forming the ceiling.

The manor-house also contains several large fireplaces in the kitchen, lower-hall, upper-hall, and chambers. In the lower groundfloor-hall, there is a superb monumental fireplace, with an opening of 2.5 metres, bearing the arms of Rohan. Some characters carved in stone, among them a biniou player (Breton bagpipe), animals and sculpted heads complete the decoration.

Finally, in keeping with the Breton tradition, a beautiful basin of three metres in diameter, in granite and of a single piece, occupies the centre of the cour d’honneur. Water arrived there from the fountain of Saint-Néventer.

== Legends and hardships ==
There are several detailed accounts of the pillage of the Manor of Mézarnou in 1594 by Yves Du Liscouët, during which he had the owner, Hervé de Parcevaux, imprisoned in the château of Brest while he looted the richly decorated manor-house from top to bottom. The Archives départementales du Finistère contain the original complaint petition submitted by Hervé de Parcevaux in 1603 and in which the inventory of the manor is reproduced in full. Du Liscoët is said to have carried away even crosses, chalices and ornaments from the churches of Plounéventer, Plouédern, Lanneufret and Trémaouézan, which had deposited them at the manor in the hope of protecting them from robbers who were ravaging the countryside at the time.

The manor was also visited by and occupied for a short while by the bandit-rebel La Fontenelle, who kidnapped the youngest daughter-in-law of Hervé de Parcevaux, Marie Le Chevoir, and made her his wife.

== Preservation efforts ==
Currently efforts are underway by the new owner, Michel Kergourlay, to repair and rebuild several sections of the crumbling manor-house. The large Gothic dormer window has been repaired, the roof has been repaired, and work is underway to repair the western wing of the manor that holds the old kitchen, oratory and the guard-house.

The castle has been listed as a Monument historique (historical monument) by the French Ministry of Culture since 2002.
