= Igeum-dong =

Archaeological site in South Korea

Coordinates: 34°57′05″N 128°06′40″E

- Hangul: 이금동
- Hanja: 梨琴洞
- RR: Igeum-dong
- MR: Igŭm-dong

Igeum-dong (Korean: 이금동) is a complex archaeological site located in Igeum-dong, Samcheonpo in Sacheon-si, South Gyeongsang Province, South Korea. This prehistoric archaeological site is important in Korean prehistory because it represents solid evidence that simple chiefdoms formed in as early as the Middle Mumun, some 950 years before the first state-level societies formed in Korea. The settlement is dated by pottery, pit-house types, and an AMS radiocarbon date to the Late Middle Mumun Pottery Period (c. 700–550 BC). Test excavations were conducted in 1997, and wide-scope horizontal excavations took place in 1998 and 1999.

The site contains a megalithic cemetery with 63 burials, some of them with artifacts of high-status, 25 raised-floor buildings, including the two largest raised-floor buildings in Korean prehistory, 5 ditches, 1 palisade, and 27 pit-houses. The intra-site patterns show that the site is divided up into at least three ‘zones’: 1) mortuary, (2) feasting-meeting, and (3) residential.

== Megalithic cemetery ==
The megalithic cemetery is notable for a number of high-status burials and an interconnected series of low ‘pavement’ features made of rounded river cobbles that link the burials together. Individual megalithic burials were constructed with small cobble pavements in the vicinity of the grave, but through time a long line of burials became interconnected through these pavements. The pavement features themselves are thought to have functioned as ritual altars on which was placed fine red-burnished pottery and other offerings. The overall length of the excavated burials in the long, strung-out cemetery is some hundreds of metres and must have formed through numerous individual funerary events that took place over a number of generations.

Some of the artifacts excavated from the cemetery include two rare Liaoning-style bronze daggers (Burial Nos. C-10 and D-4). Other burials yielded hundreds of large tubular greenstone ornaments, groundstone daggers, and finely made red-burnished pottery.

== Raised-floor buildings: meeting places or dwellings of chiefs? ==
The cemetery lies beside two long raised-floor buildings, Nos. 60 and 61. These buildings were placed on a series of large wooden footings, the largest of which approached 2 m in diameter. Building 60 was 29 m in length and 174 m^{2} in area, and No. 61 was 26 m in length in 130 m^{2} in area. Based on these large dimensions, the excavators have illustrated Nos. 60 and 61 as being built up high, not unlike the reconstructions of raised-floor buildings at the Yayoi period Yoshinogari site in Saga, Kyūshū, Japan. Pottery was excavated in and around the two large raised-floor buildings at Igeum-dong, indicating that they were likely used for feasts and meetings. Alternatively, the buildings could also be the dwellings of Igeum-dong's chief and/or members of the local elite group.

The two large raised-floor buildings separate the megalithic cemetery from the residential area at Igeum-dong. The residential area is composed of pit-houses in the Late Middle Mumun style, otherwise known as Songguk-ri-style. Additionally, raised-floor buildings of varying sizes and plans are found in this area. The largest pit-houses and raised-floor buildings are located closest to Nos. 60 and 61, and successively smaller pit-houses are found the further one is from the two largest raised-floor buildings.

Igeum-dong is unique among Mumun pottery period sites in that 1) bronze objects come from the megalithic cemetery, (2) there are two large raised-floor buildings, and (3) a highly organized intra-site settlement plan. Some archaeologists propose that Igeum-dong was the central settlement of a small chiefdom. Other bronze artifact-bearing major Late Middle Mumun cemeteries such as Deokcheon-ri (덕천리), Jeongyang-ri (적량리), Jindong-ri (진동리), and Yulha-ri (율하리) are found at a number of locations in a similar environmental location not far from the sea. The personages represented by the high-status burials at Igeum-dong may have been the masters of the large raised-floor buildings and they became prominent by being highly involved in economic trade between south-coastal Korea, the interior of South Gyeongsang Province, and northern Kyushu in Japan.

== See also ==
- Prehistory of Korea
- Bronze Age
- Liaoning bronze dagger culture
- Megalithic tomb
- Daepyeong
