= Plounéventer =

Plounéventer Gwineventer
- Commune
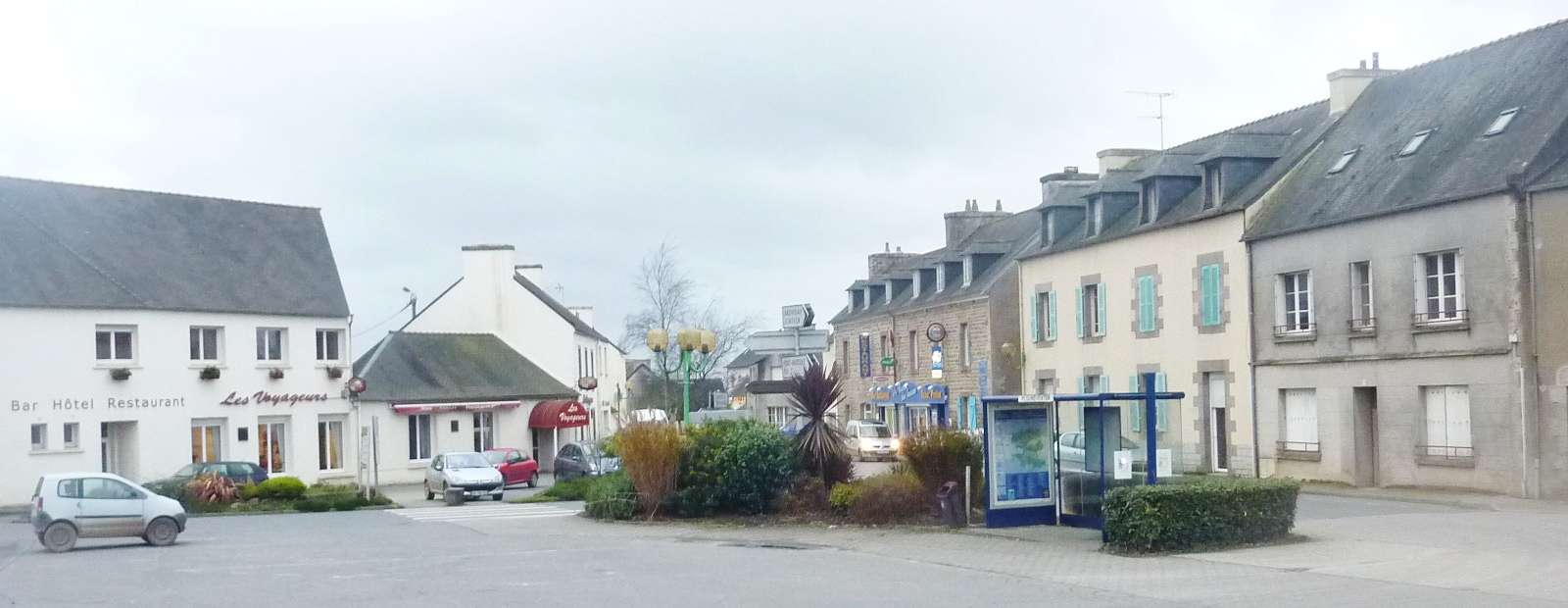
- The main square, in front of the parish church

- Coat of arms
- Location of Plounéventer
- Location within France Location within Brittany
- Coordinates: 48°30′57″N 4°12′39″W
- Country: France
- Region: Brittany
- Department: Finistère
- Arrondissement: Morlaix
- Canton: Landivisiau
- Intercommunality: Pays de Landivisiau

Government
  - Mayor (2022–2026): Jean-Luc Abalain
- Area^{1}: 27.28 km^{2} (10.53 sq mi)
- Highest elevation: 108 m (354 ft)
- Lowest elevation: 14 m (46 ft)
- Population (2023): 2,251
  - Density: 82.51/km^{2} (213.7/sq mi)
- Time zone: UTC+01:00 (CET)
  - Summer (DST): UTC+02:00 (CEST)
- INSEE/Postal code: 29204 /29400
- Website: Official website
- ^{1} French Land Register data, which excludes lakes, ponds, glaciers > 1 km^{2} (0.386 sq mi or 247 acres) and river estuaries.

Plounéventer (French pronunciation: [plunevɛ̃tɛʁ]; Breton: Gwineventer, [ɡwiˈneːvɛntɛr]) is a commune in the Finistère department, Brittany, northwestern France.

== Population ==
Historical population
| Year | Pop. | ±% p.a. |
|---|---|---|
| 1968 | 1,303 | — |
| 1975 | 1,310 | +0.08% |
| 1982 | 1,416 | +1.12% |
| 1990 | 1,498 | +0.71% |
| 1999 | 1,483 | −0.11% |
| 2007 | 1,684 | +1.60% |
| 2012 | 2,083 | +4.34% |
| 2017 | 2,088 | +0.05% |
| 2023 | 2,251 | +1.26% |
Source: INSEE

== Places of interest ==
- Château de Mézarnou – a large 16th-century fortified manor house, currently being restored.

== See also ==
- Communes of the Finistère department
