= Orbigny, Indre-et-Loire =

Orbigny
- Commune
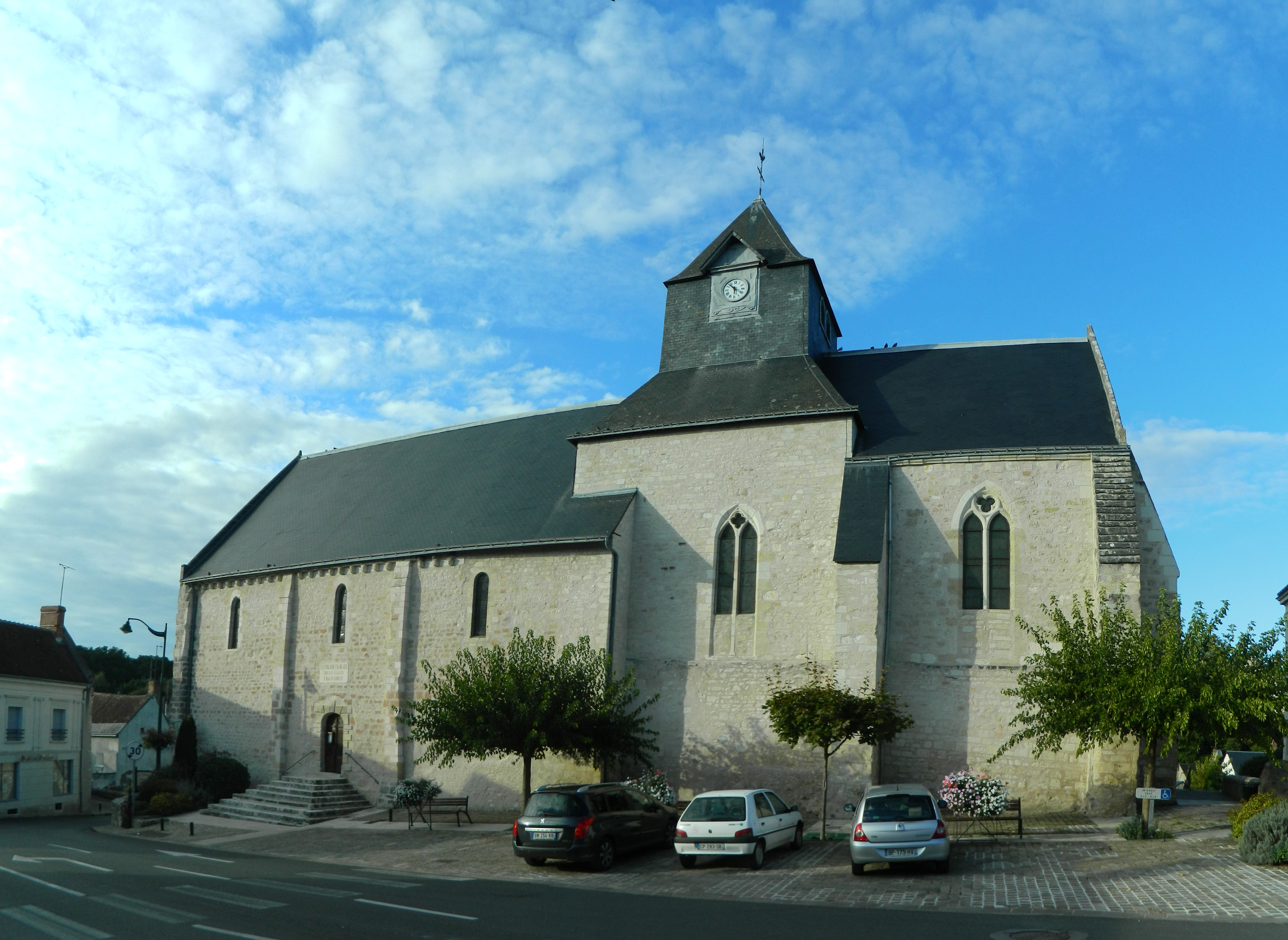
- The church of Saint-Vincent, in Orbigny

- Coat of arms
- Location of Orbigny
- Location within France Location within Centre-Val de Loire
- Coordinates: 47°12′40″N 1°14′03″E
- Country: France
- Region: Centre-Val de Loire
- Department: Indre-et-Loire
- Arrondissement: Loches
- Canton: Loches
- Intercommunality: CC Loches Sud Touraine

Government
  - Mayor (2020–2026): Jacky Charbonnier
- Area^{1}: 65.88 km^{2} (25.44 sq mi)
- Highest elevation: 182 m (597 ft)
- Lowest elevation: 98 m (322 ft)
- Population (2023): 712
  - Density: 10.8/km^{2} (28.0/sq mi)
- Time zone: UTC+01:00 (CET)
  - Summer (DST): UTC+02:00 (CEST)
- INSEE/Postal code: 37177 /37460
- ^{1} French Land Register data, which excludes lakes, ponds, glaciers > 1 km^{2} (0.386 sq mi or 247 acres) and river estuaries.

Orbigny (French pronunciation: [ɔʁbiɲi]) is a commune in the Indre-et-Loire department, central France.

== Population ==
Historical population
Year	Pop.	±% p.a.
1968	1,045	—
1975	846	−2.97%
1982	785	−1.06%
1990	721	−1.06%
1999	727	+0.09%
2007	750	+0.39%
2012	755	+0.13%
2017	732	−0.62%
2023	712	−0.46%
Source: INSEE

== See also ==
- Communes of the Indre-et-Loire department
