= Liaoning bronze dagger culture =

Archaeological complex in China and North Korea

The Liaoning bronze dagger culture or Lute-shaped bronze dagger culture is the provisional designation of an archeological complex of the Bronze Age in Northeast China and the northern part of the Korean Peninsula. Its classification is controversial. While some believe it to be sufficiently distinct to be labelled as a separate culture, others associate the findings with the Upper Xiajiadian culture.

Artifacts from the culture are found primarily in the Liaoning area of northeast China and in the Korean Peninsula. Various other bronze artifacts, including ornaments and weapons, are associated with the culture, but the daggers are viewed as the most characteristic. Liaoning bronzes contain a higher percentage of zinc than those of the neighboring bronze cultures.

Lee Chung-kyu (1996) considers that the culture is properly divided into five phases: Phases I and II typified by lute-shaped daggers, Phases IV and V by slender daggers, and Phase III by the transition between the two. Of these, remains from Phases I, II and III can be found in some amounts in both the Korean Peninsula and northeast China, but remains from Phases IV and V are found almost exclusively in Korea.

== Lute-shaped daggers ==
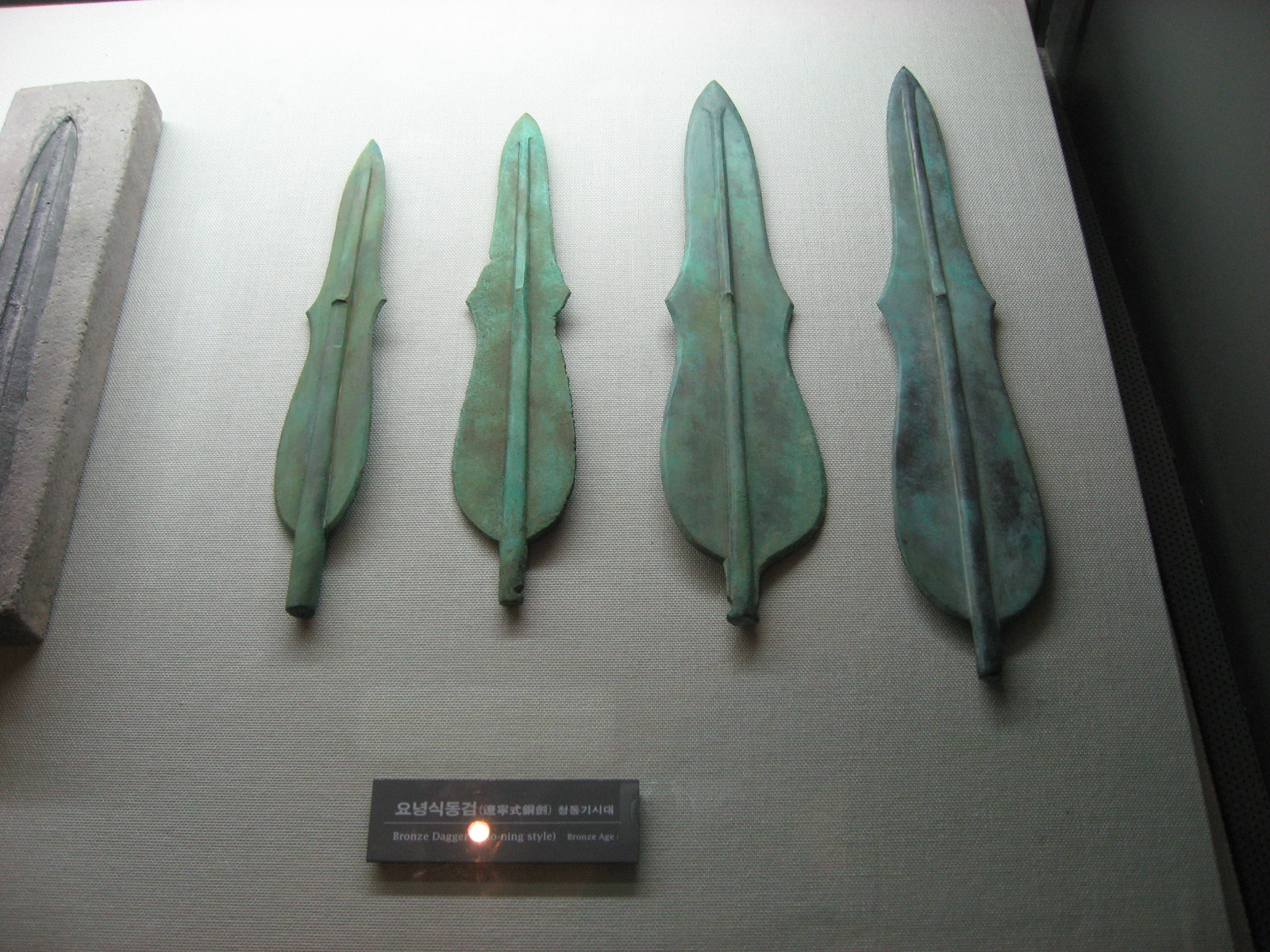
Liaoning-style violin-shaped bronze knives from Korea held at the War Memorial (Seoul).

The early phase consists of an early period of bronze manufacture without daggers originated from the spreading processes of Siberian Seima-Turbino Type bronzeware throughout Eurasia continent, followed by a period of producing what is now called lute- or violin-shaped daggers by Korean scholars (Bipahyungdonggeom, 비파형동검). The earliest period of production of lute-shaped daggers is dated to the 14th century BCE.

The earliest artifacts from this period are found exclusively in Liaoning of northeast China and seem only gradually to have spread to the Korean peninsula. By Lee's (1996) Phase II, however, a distinctive notched form of dagger begins to emerge in southern Korea, suggesting that by this time independent bronze production had begun in that region.

Some argue it to be a regional variation of a much larger distribution of similar daggers that range from Hebei and Inner Mongolia in the west to the Korean peninsula in the east. Many scholars consider it to be a style shared by a number of groups, rather than representing a single culture.

Evidence gained from pottery indicates that the bronze dagger "culture" of this time actually included several distinct cultural groups. One distinct pottery tradition is found in northeast China and northwestern Korea, another in the Taedong River valley, another in the southwest around the Chungcheong provinces including the Geum River, and yet another throughout the rest of the southern Korean peninsula including Jeju island.

== Slender daggers ==
Distribution of Violin-shaped daggers (비파형동검) and Slender daggers (세형동검)

This later part of the Liaoning bronze dagger culture is often referred to as the "Korean bronze dagger culture," since it was largely restricted to the Korean peninsula. At this point the Liaoning culture artifacts begin to disappear from the northeast China area. A new form of dagger begins to turn up on the Korean peninsula, straight and slender (Sehyungdonggeom, 세형동검).

Sehyungdonggeom, also called Korean style dagger (Preserved in a museum in Gyeonggi.)

The greatest concentration of bronze daggers is found in the Geum River valley of South Chungcheong province. Away from this area, the daggers become progressively fewer. This appears to indicate that most daggers were produced in the Geum valley, and the other cultures of the peninsula acquired them primarily by trade. Trade also took place by sea, with artifacts from the Later Phase found in Japanese archeological sites as well.

Lee (1996) divides this phase into two distinct sections: one dating to the 3rd century BCE in which the production of slender bronze daggers predominated, and one dating to the 2nd century BCE in which daggers are often accompanied by bronze mirrors with geometric designs and halberds influenced by the Chinese Qin state. In the first part, a single pottery culture typified by clay-band applique is found throughout the Korean peninsula, but in the second part distinctive pottery types emerge in the northwest and the remainder of the peninsula.

== Historical identity ==
The disappearance of the Liaoning bronze dagger culture from Liaoning appears to coincide with the State of Yan's conquest of that area. The Korean bronze dagger culture of the Later Phase appears to correspond with the state of Jin, which occasionally enters Chinese annals as a contemporary of Wiman Joseon. Lee (1984, p. 13) views this as the period of emergence of the "walled-town states" in Korean culture, a hierarchical political structure in contrast to the tribal system which had prevailed during the Neolithic period.

Other archaelologists have associated the culture with the ancient Shanrong people, a group that lived on the periphery of Yan. However, convincing evidence for either assignment is still lacking.

== See also ==
- List of China-related topics
- History of Korea
- Megalithic tomb
