= Petroglyphs of Sikachi-Alyan =

Prehistoric rock carvings in Russia

Coordinates: 48.7989°N 135.7231°E

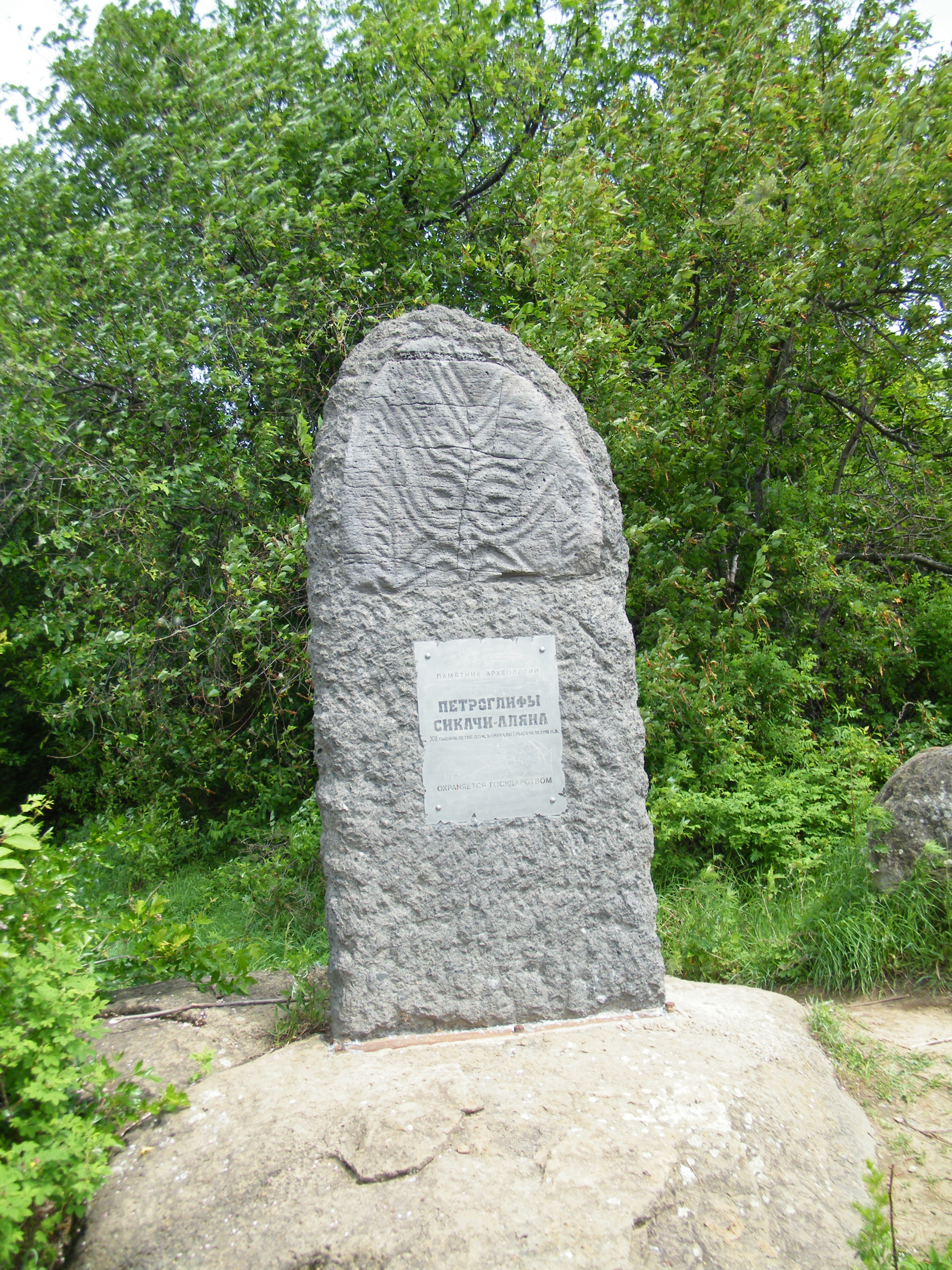
- A stele with a petroglyph on the bank of the Amur
- Interactive map of Petroglyphs of Sikachi-Alyan
- Location: Sikachi-Alyan, Khabarovsk Krai, Russia
- Nearest city: Khabarovsk

The Petroglyphs of Sikachi-Alyan are petroglyphs on basalt rocks located near the Sikachi-Alyan Nanai village in Khabarovsk Krai, Russia.

The oldest of the Sikachi-Alyan petroglyphs are dated to 12000 - 9000 BC. These petroglyphs have been known to local people for many centuries; the first scientific research about these rocks was done in 1859 by Richard Maack.

== Pictures of the petroglyphs (the lower group) ==
Petroglyphs are located on the Amur river bank downstream from the Sikachi-Alyan village. These rocks are easily accessible for viewing.

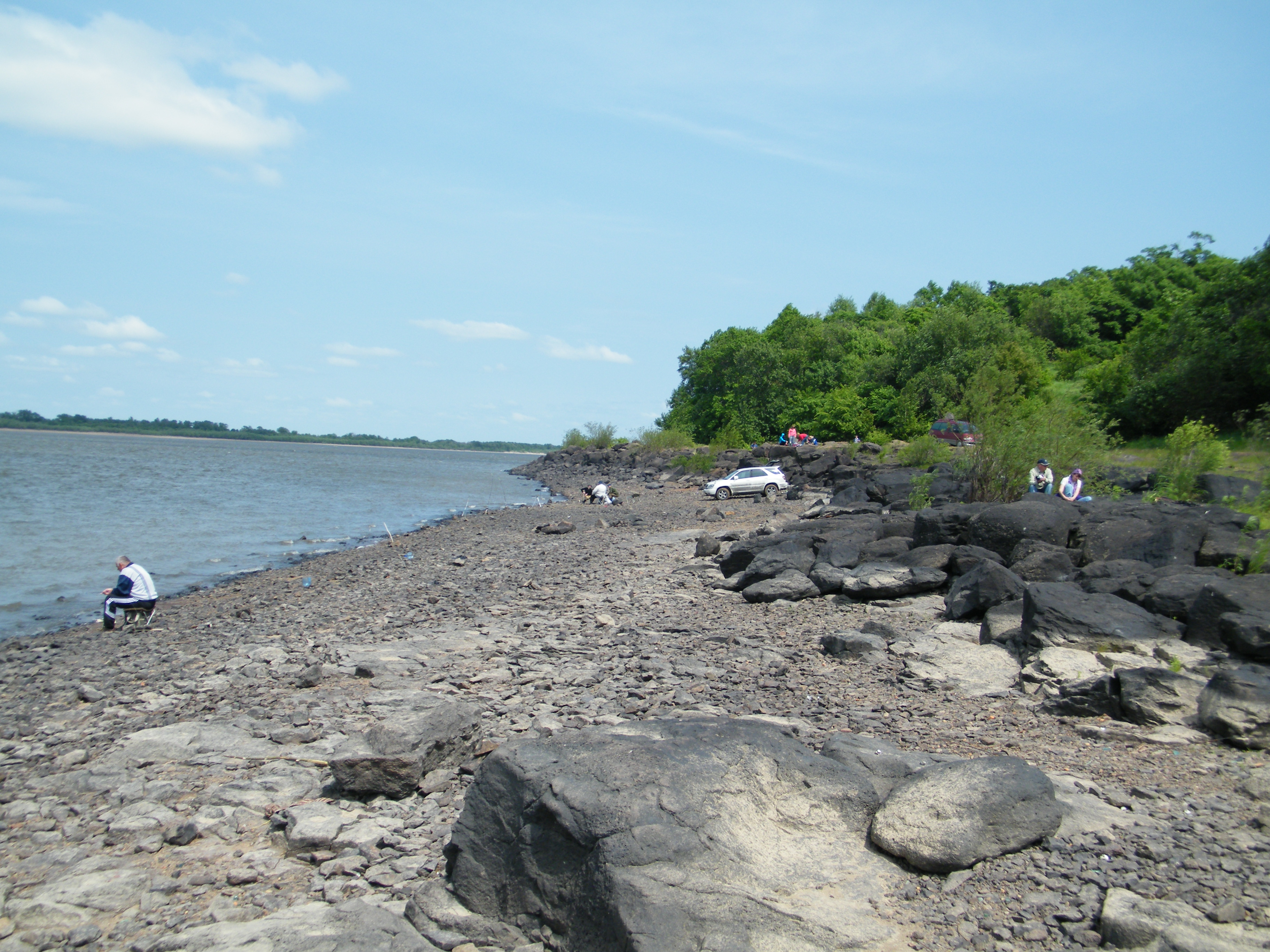
Riverbank of Amur near the lower group of petroglyphs

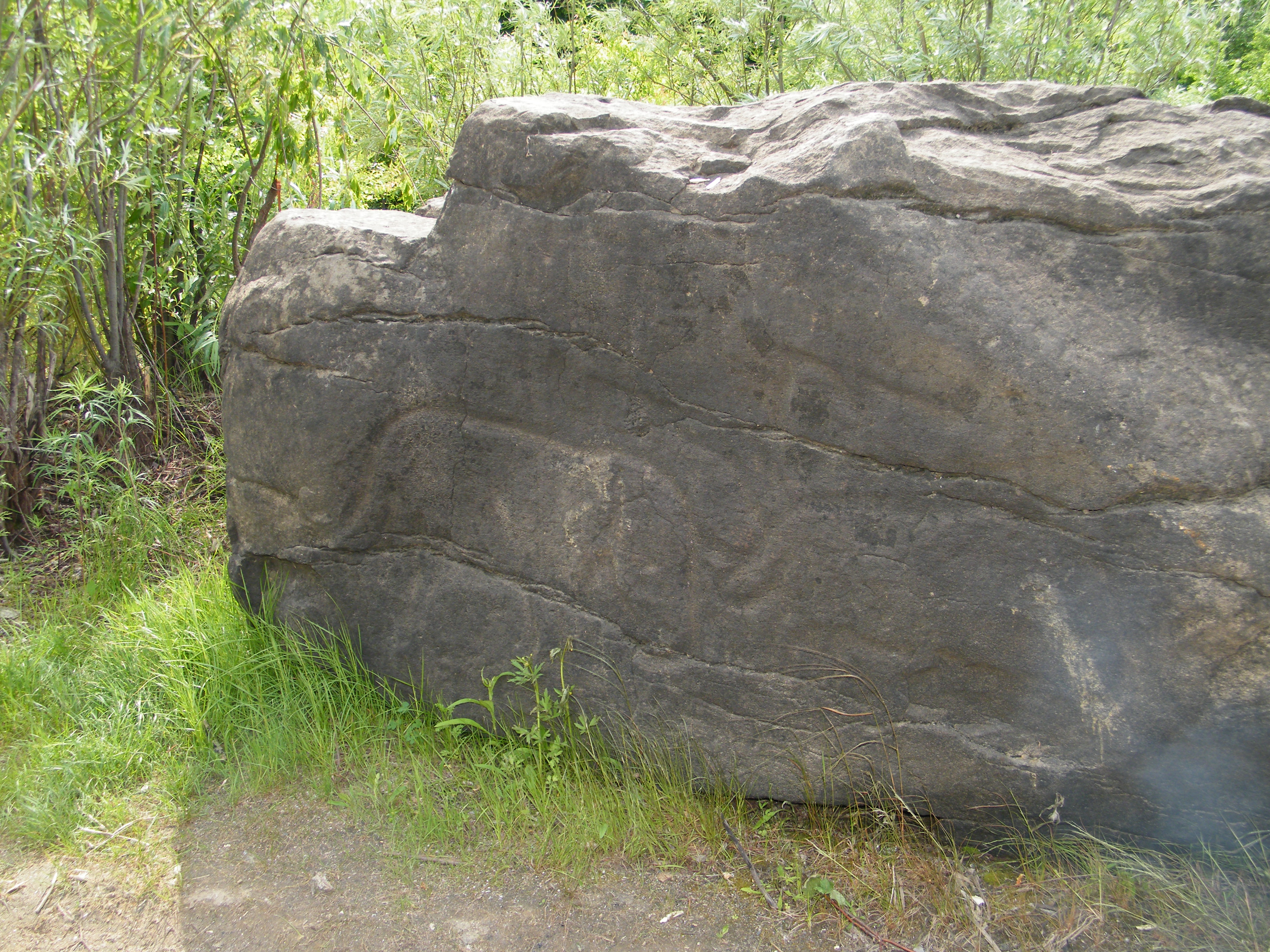
Engraving of a Mammoth

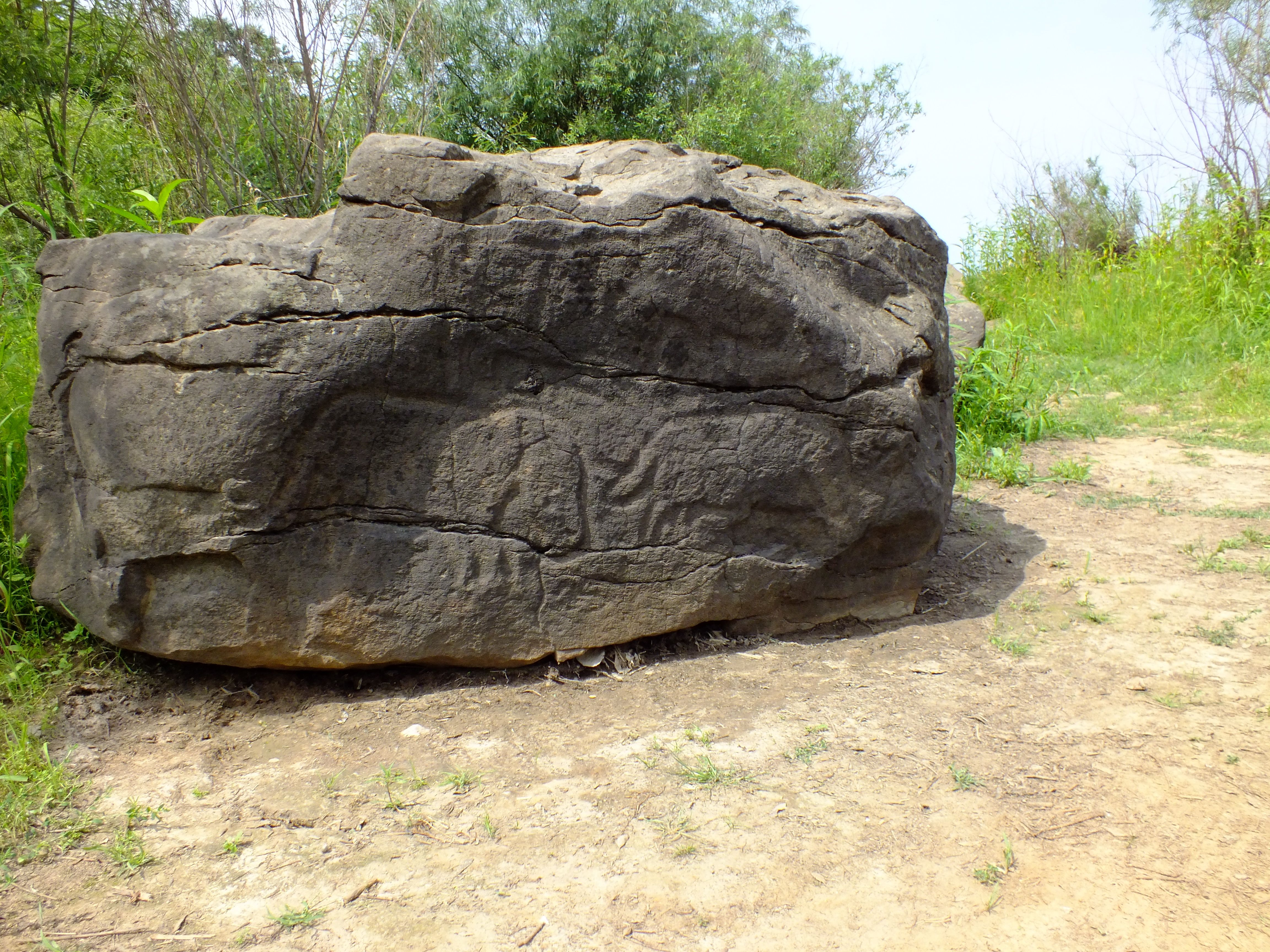
Mammoth and another creature

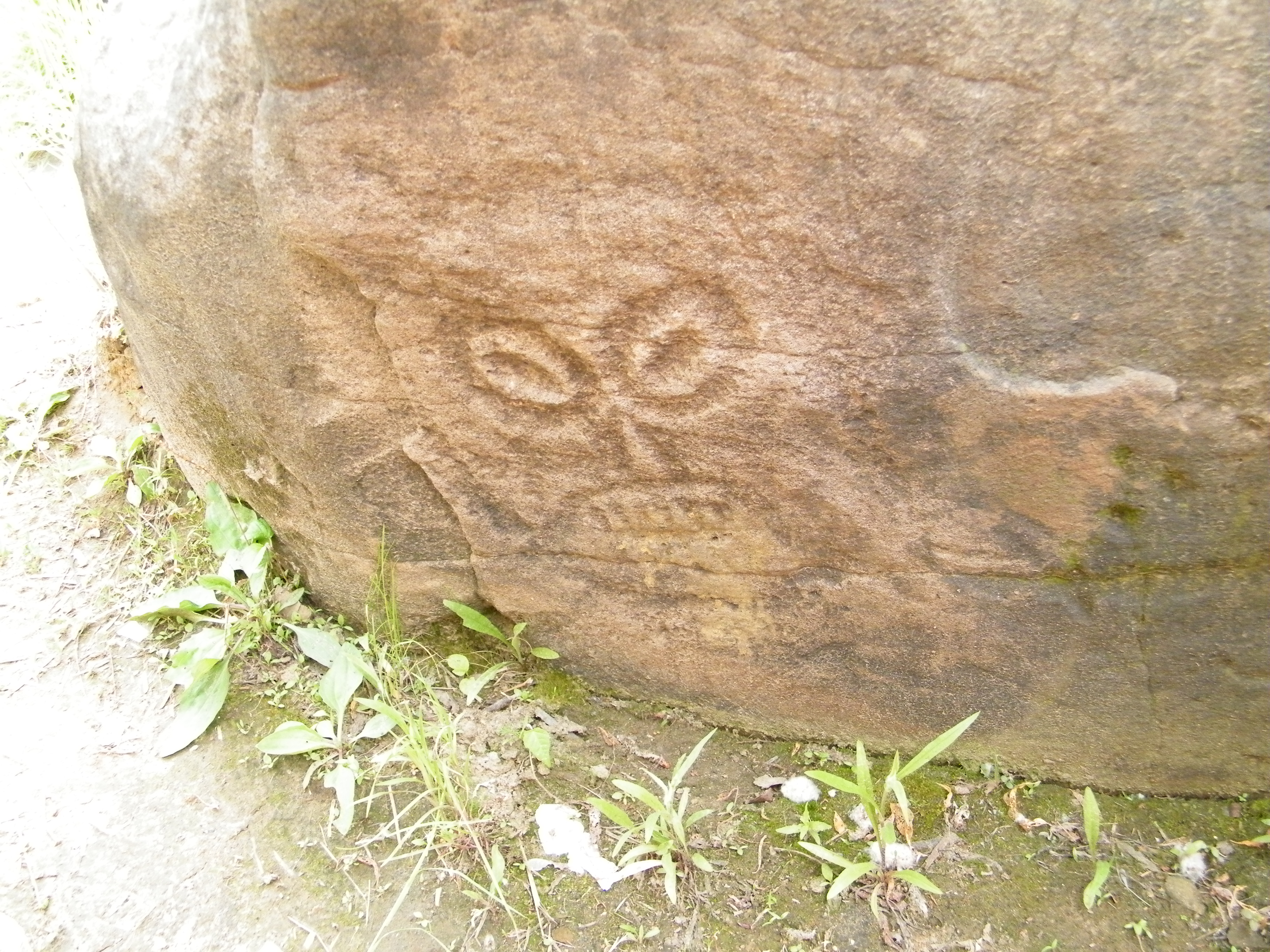
Shaman

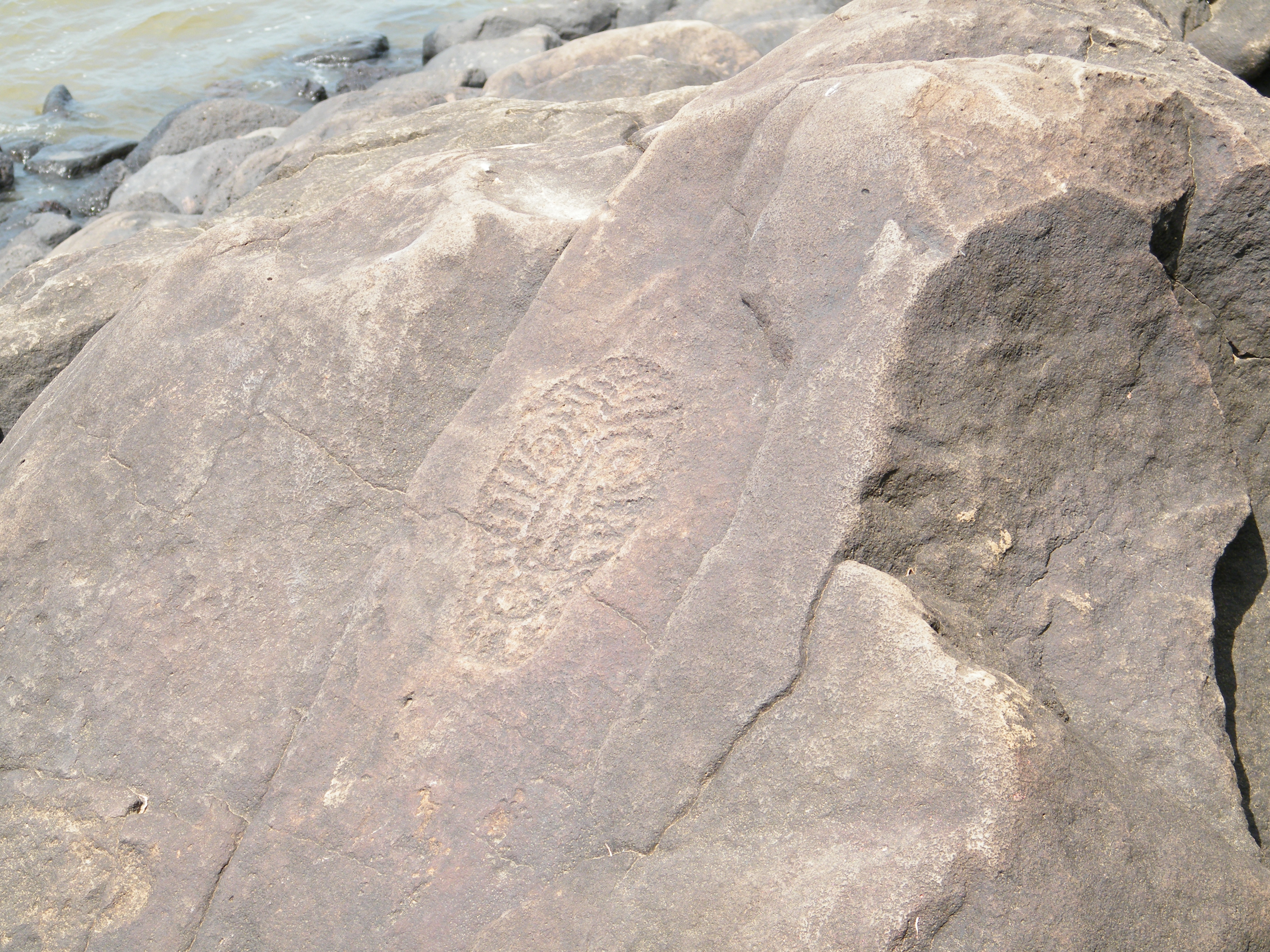
Mask

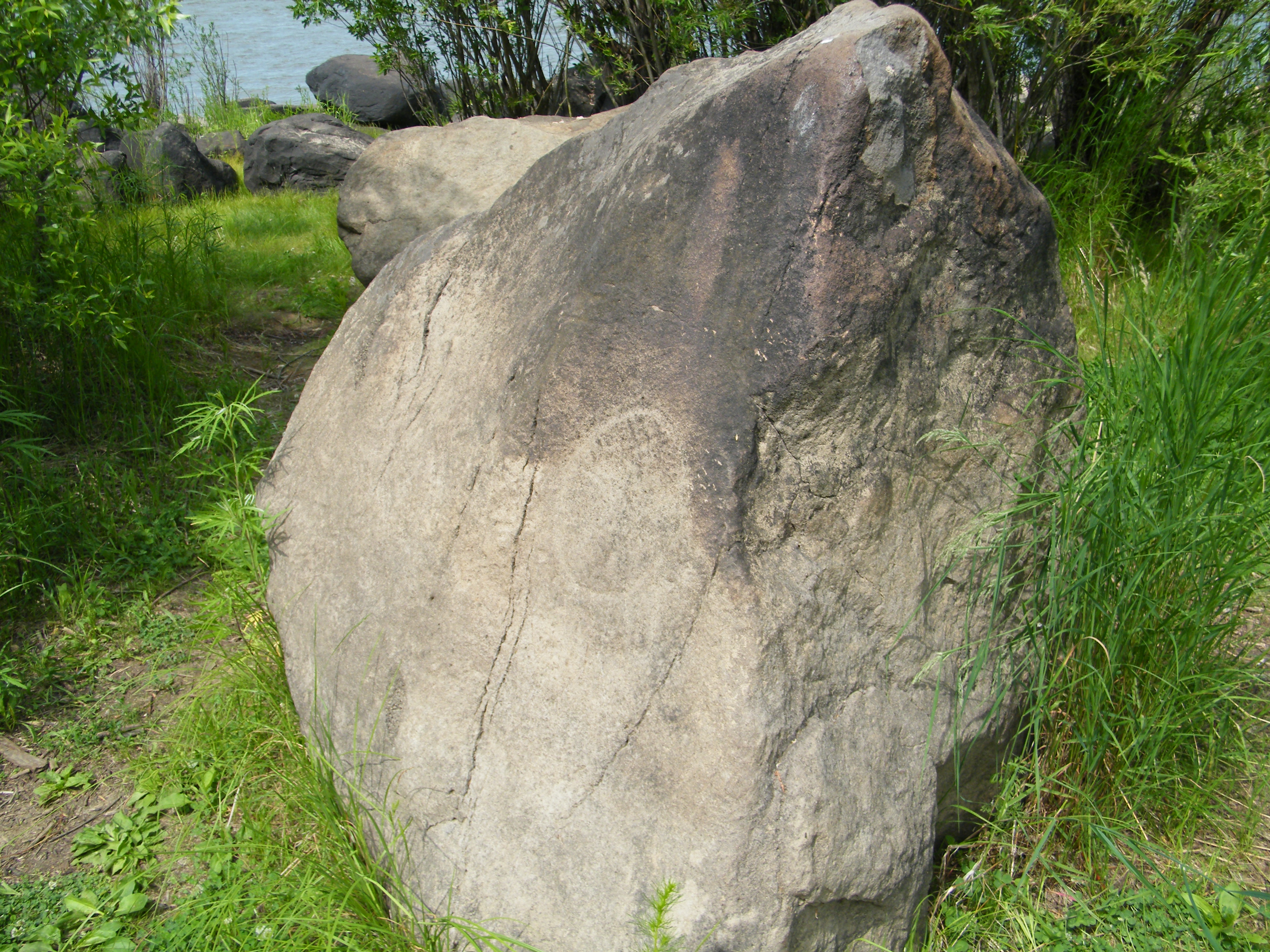
Mask

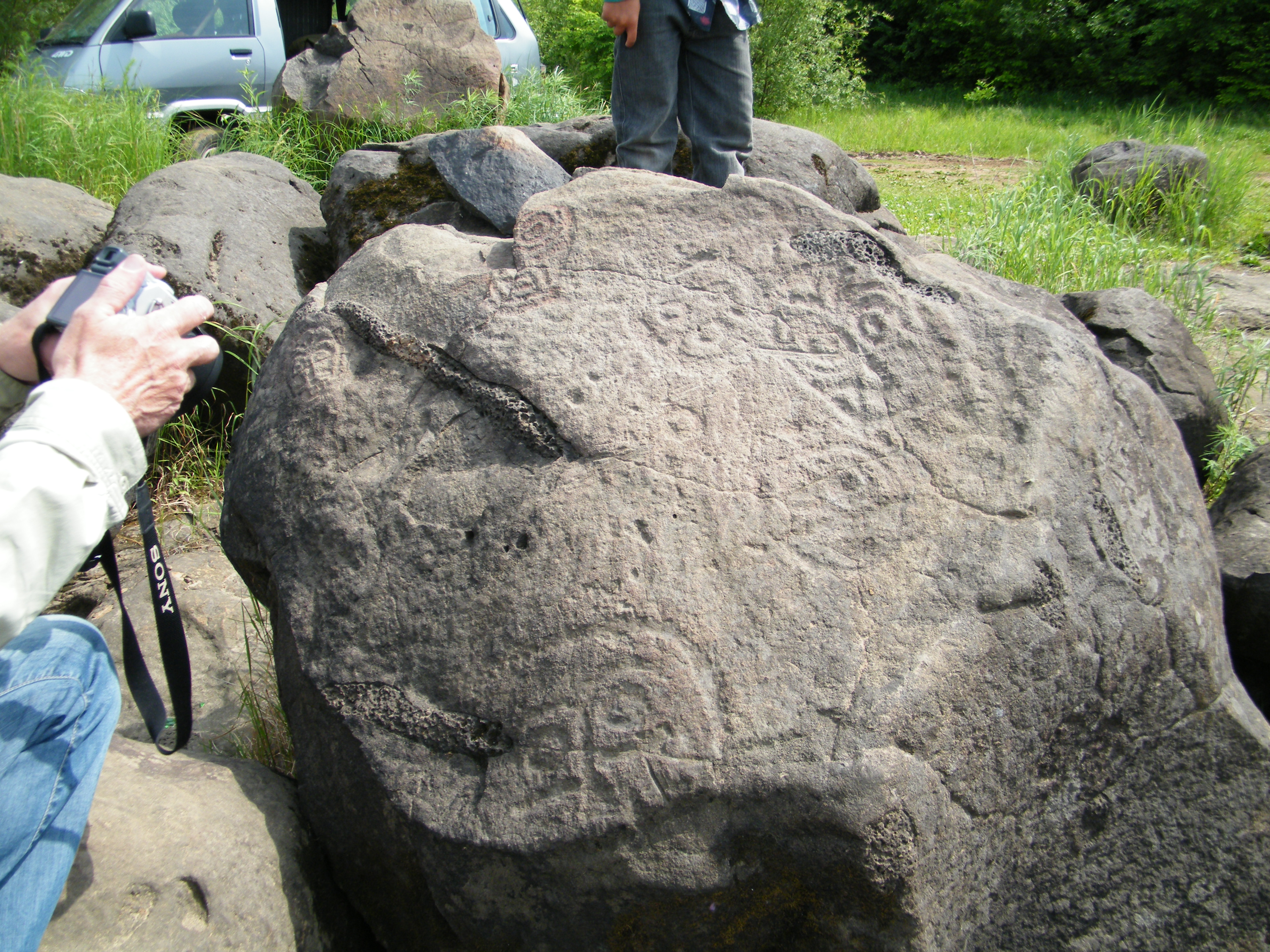
the "Seven sisters"

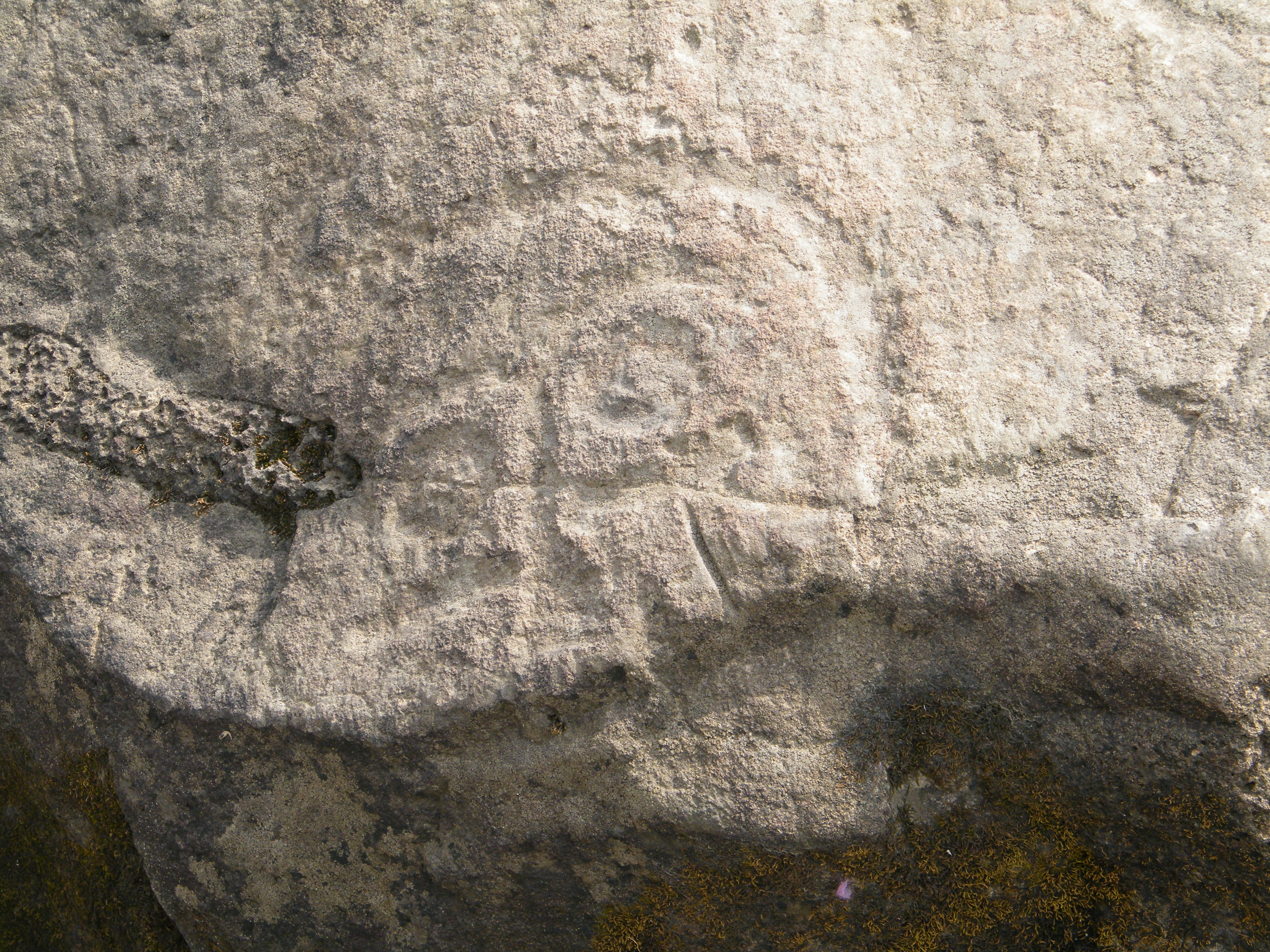
the mask of one of the sisters

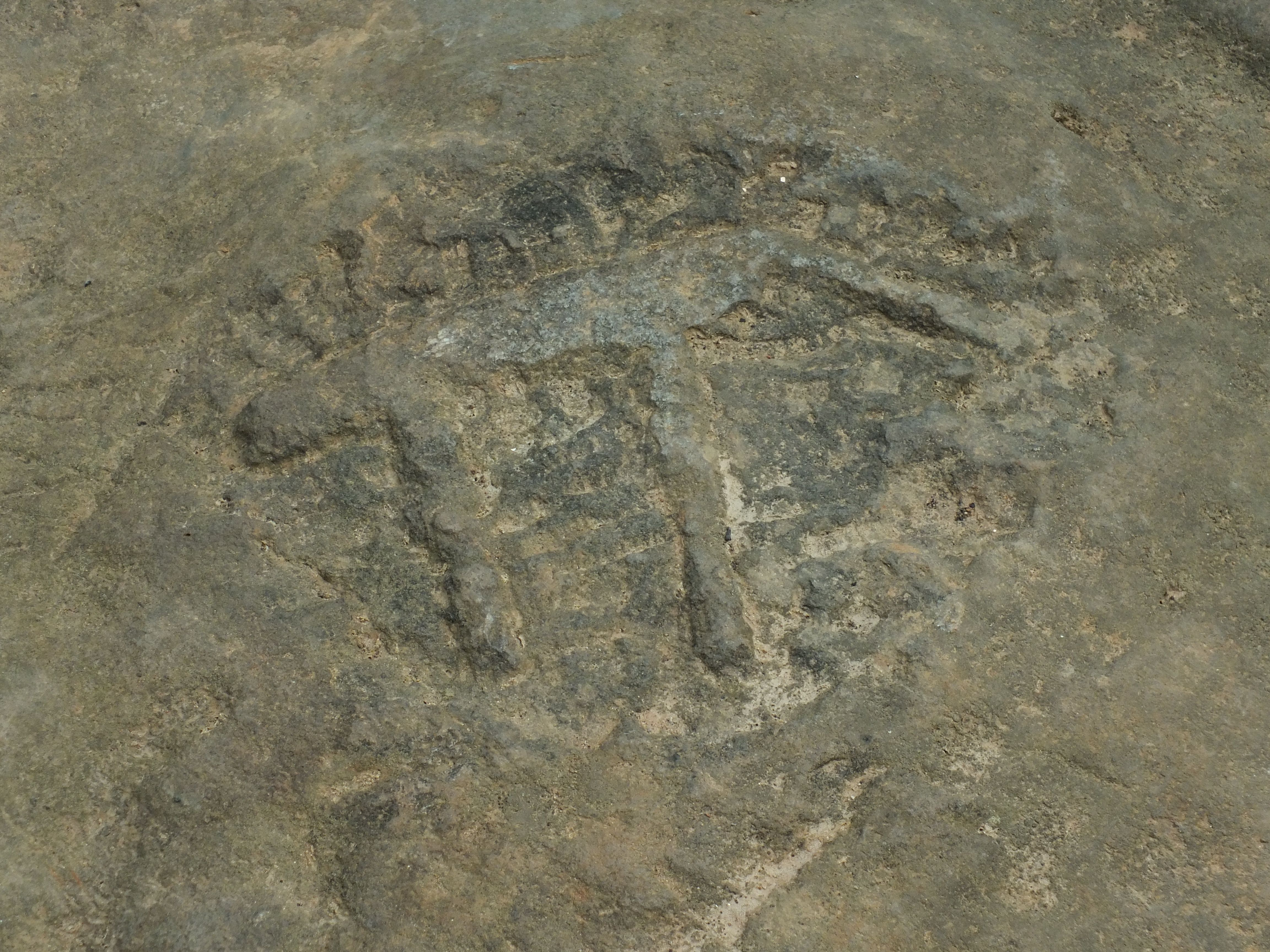
The beast with a tail

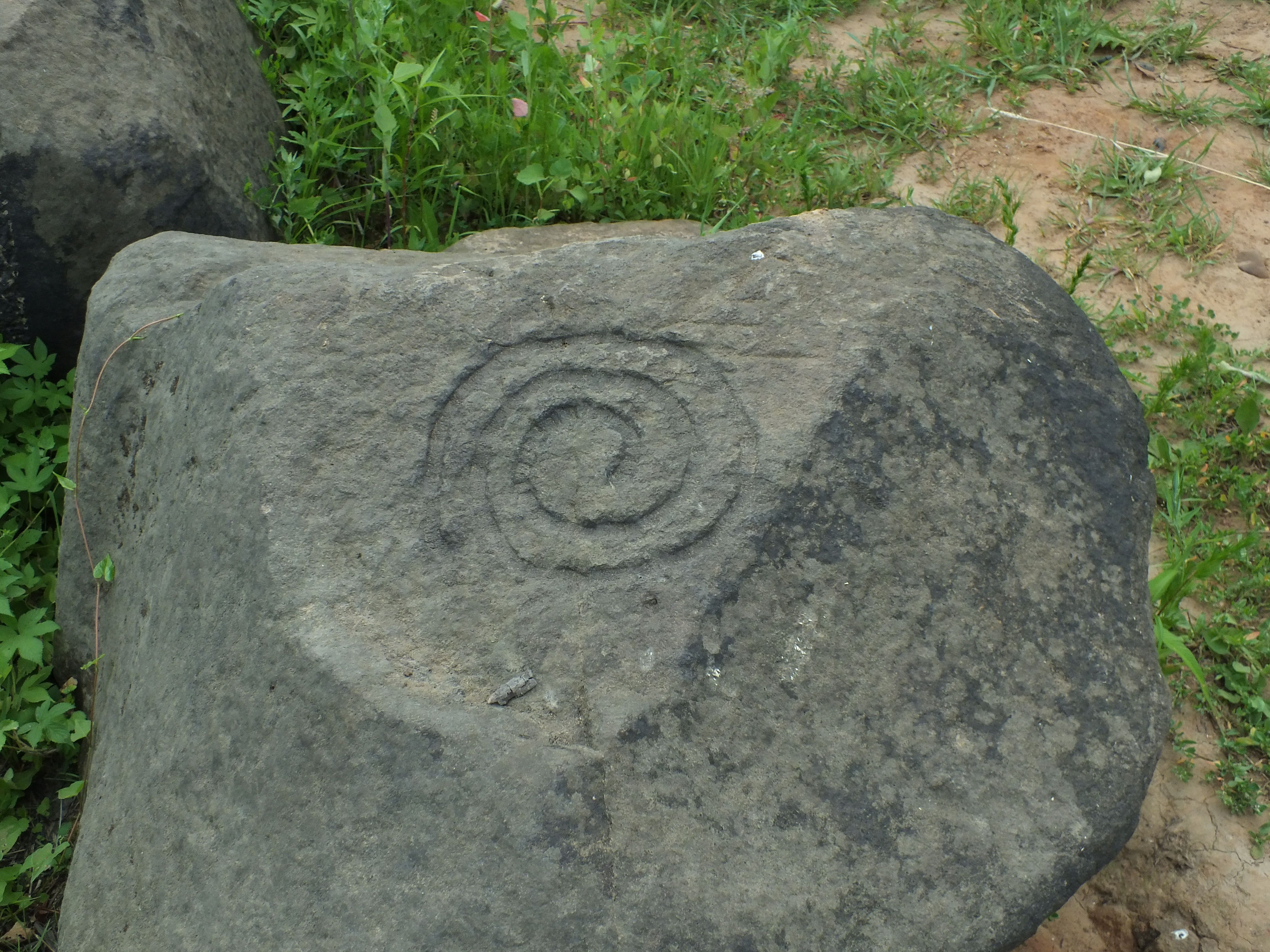
Spiral (snail)

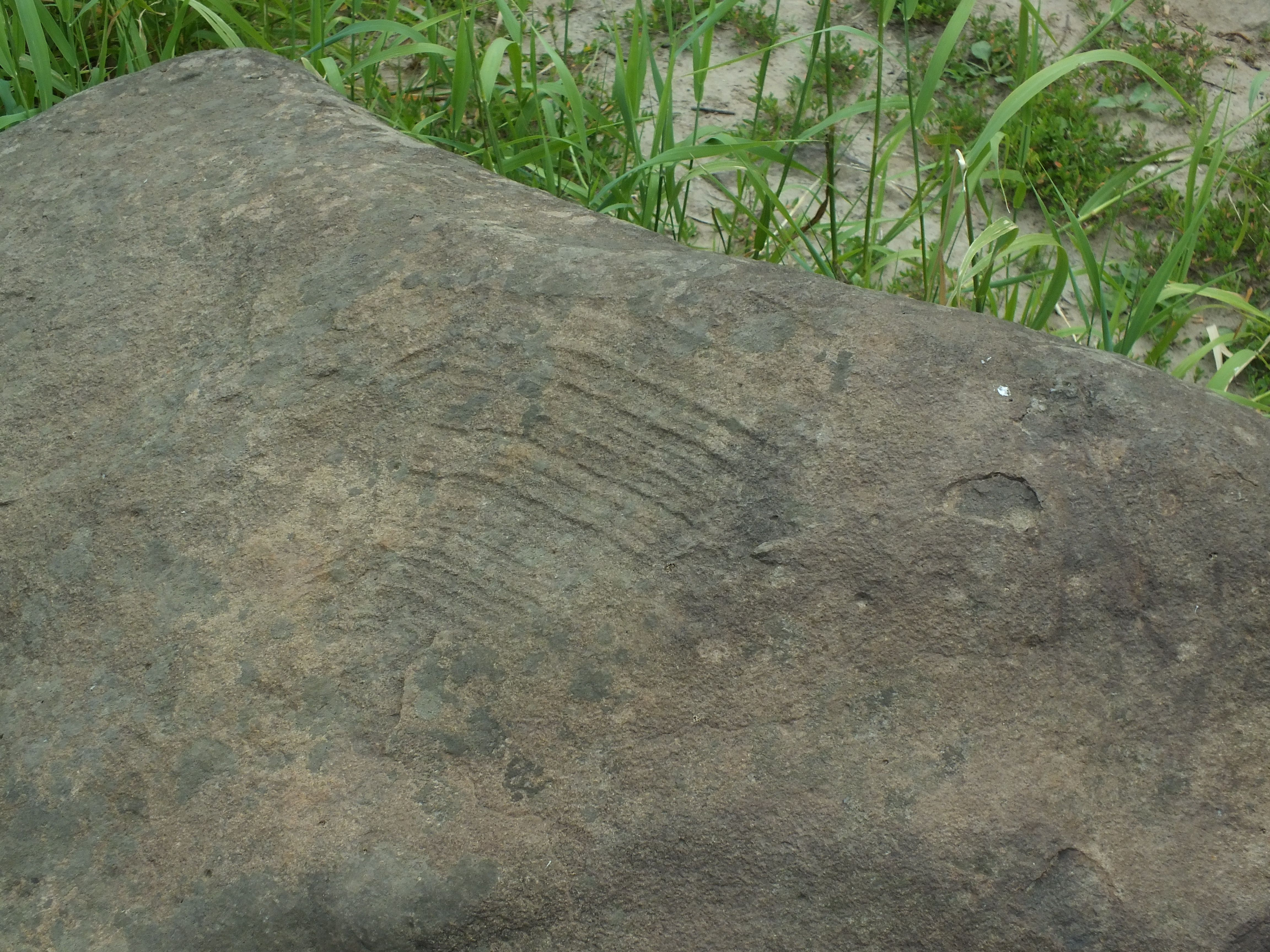
Pattern

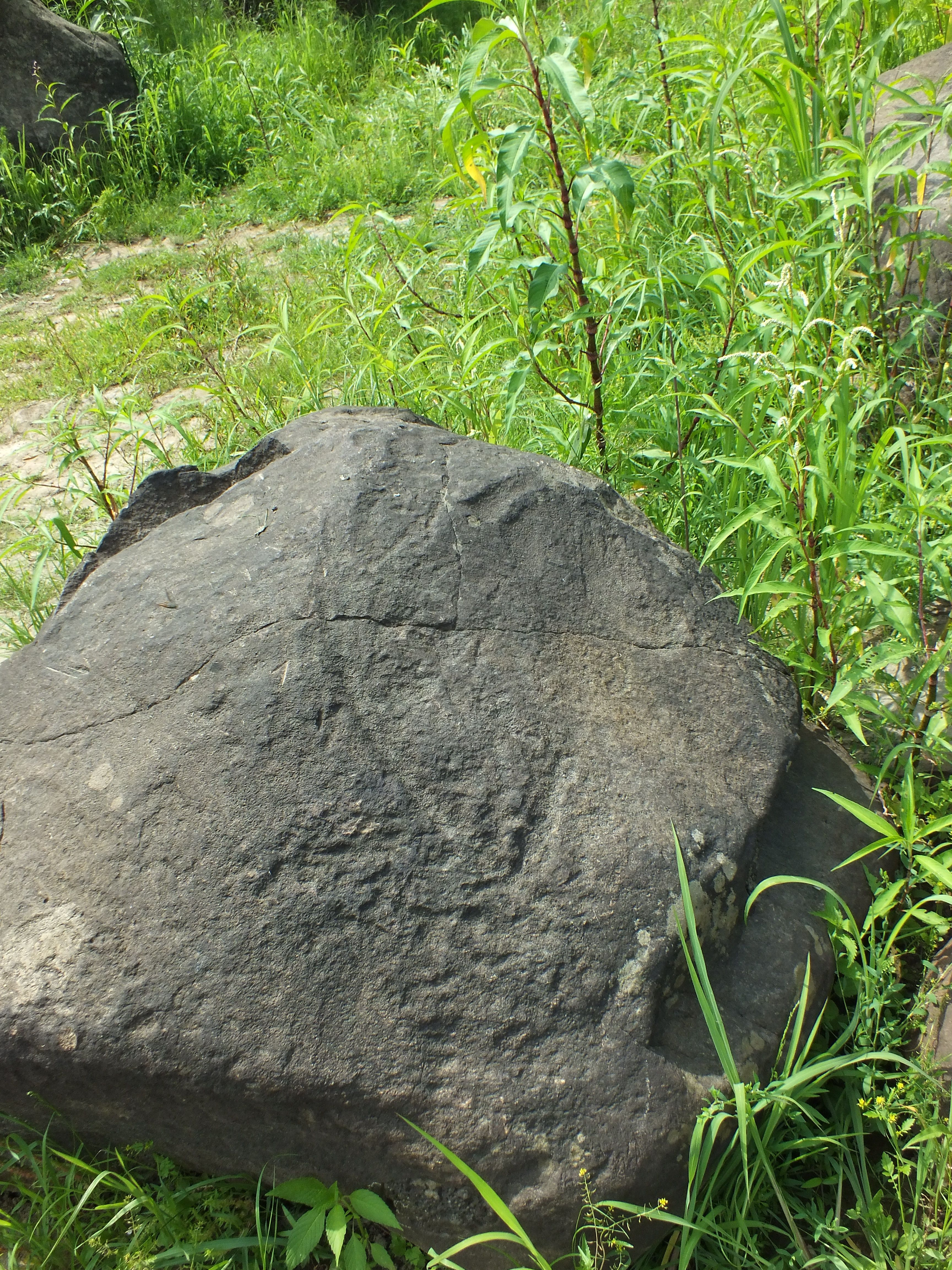
Pattern

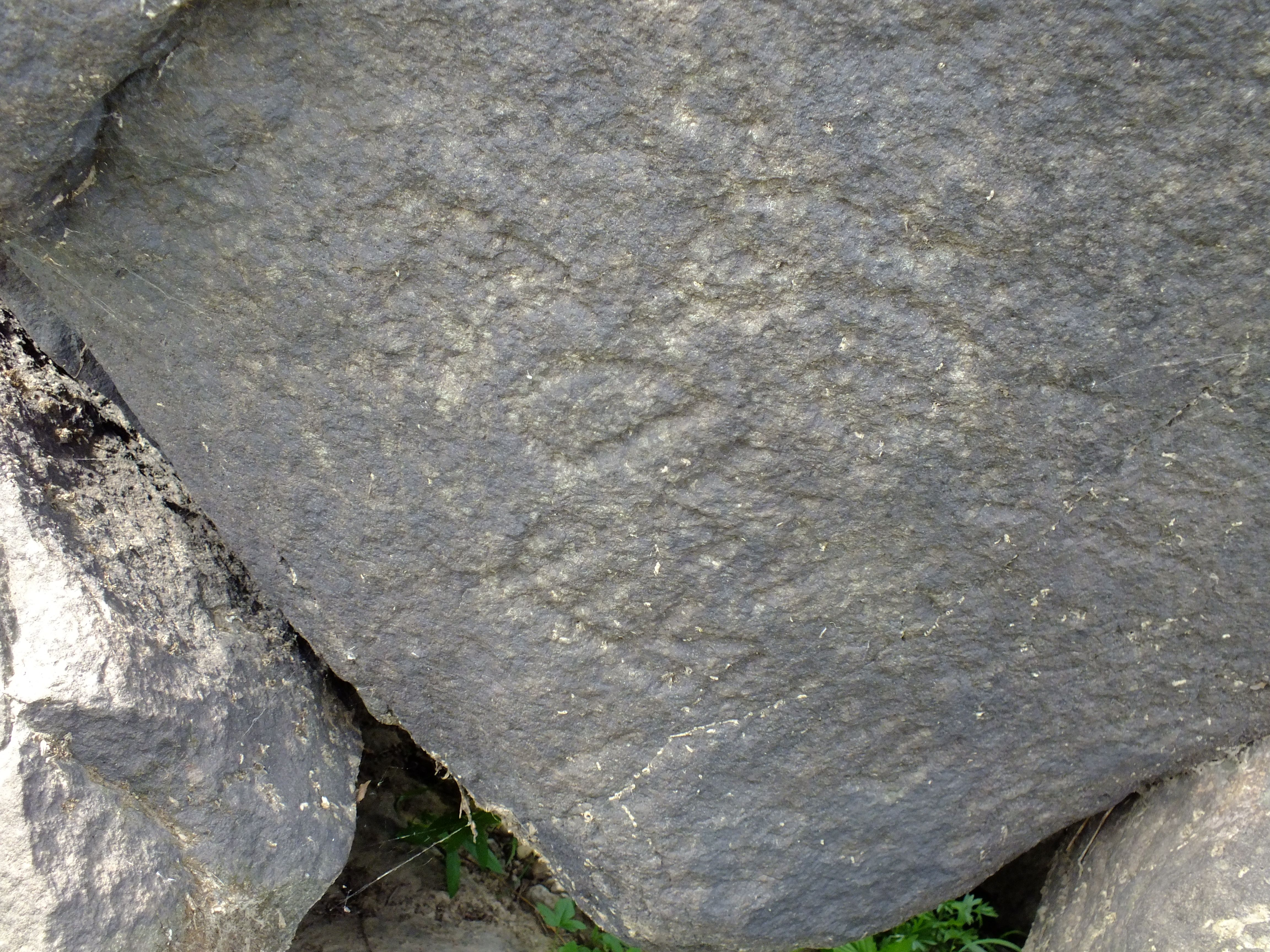
Pattern or mask

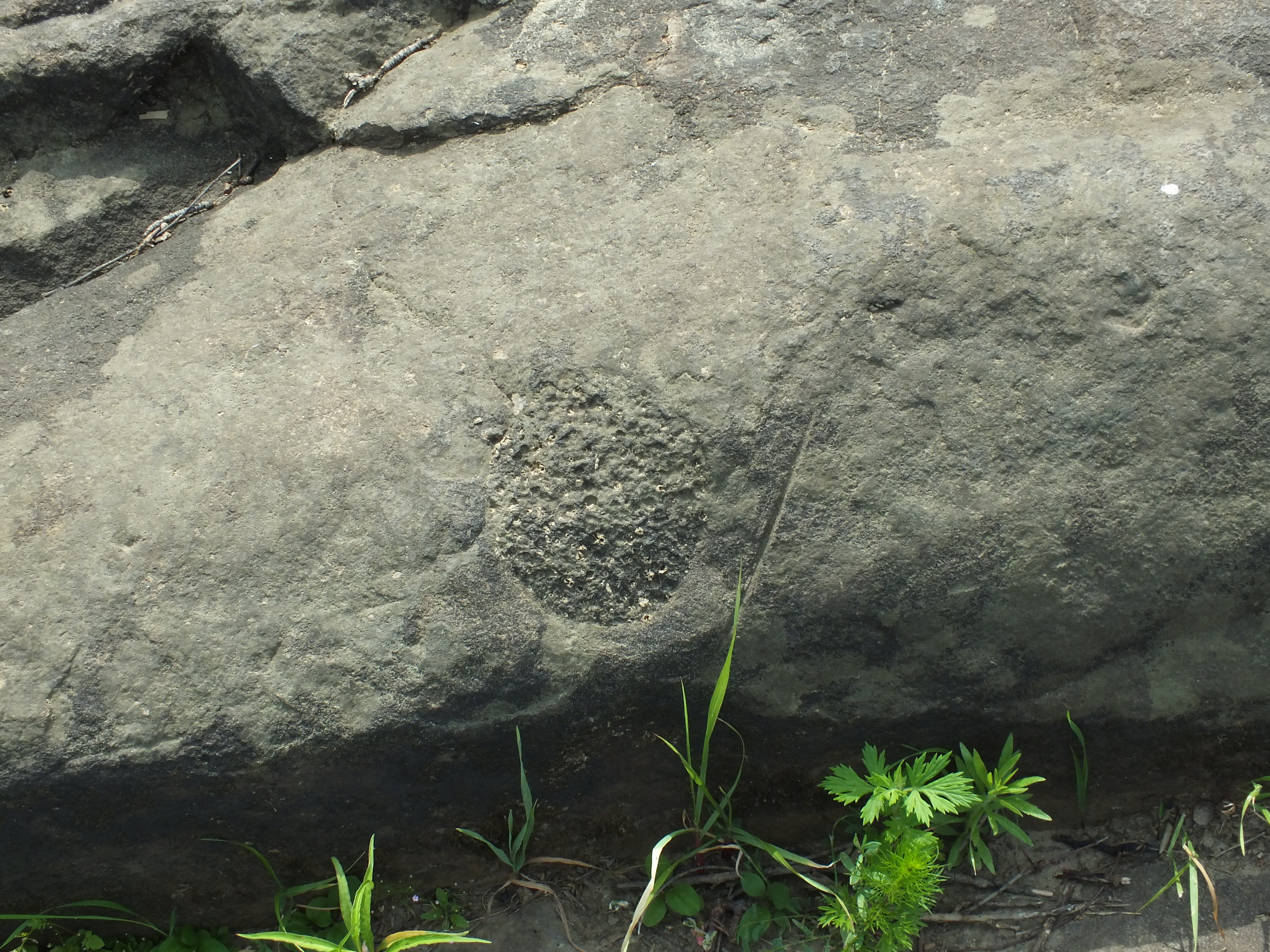
Pattern or mask

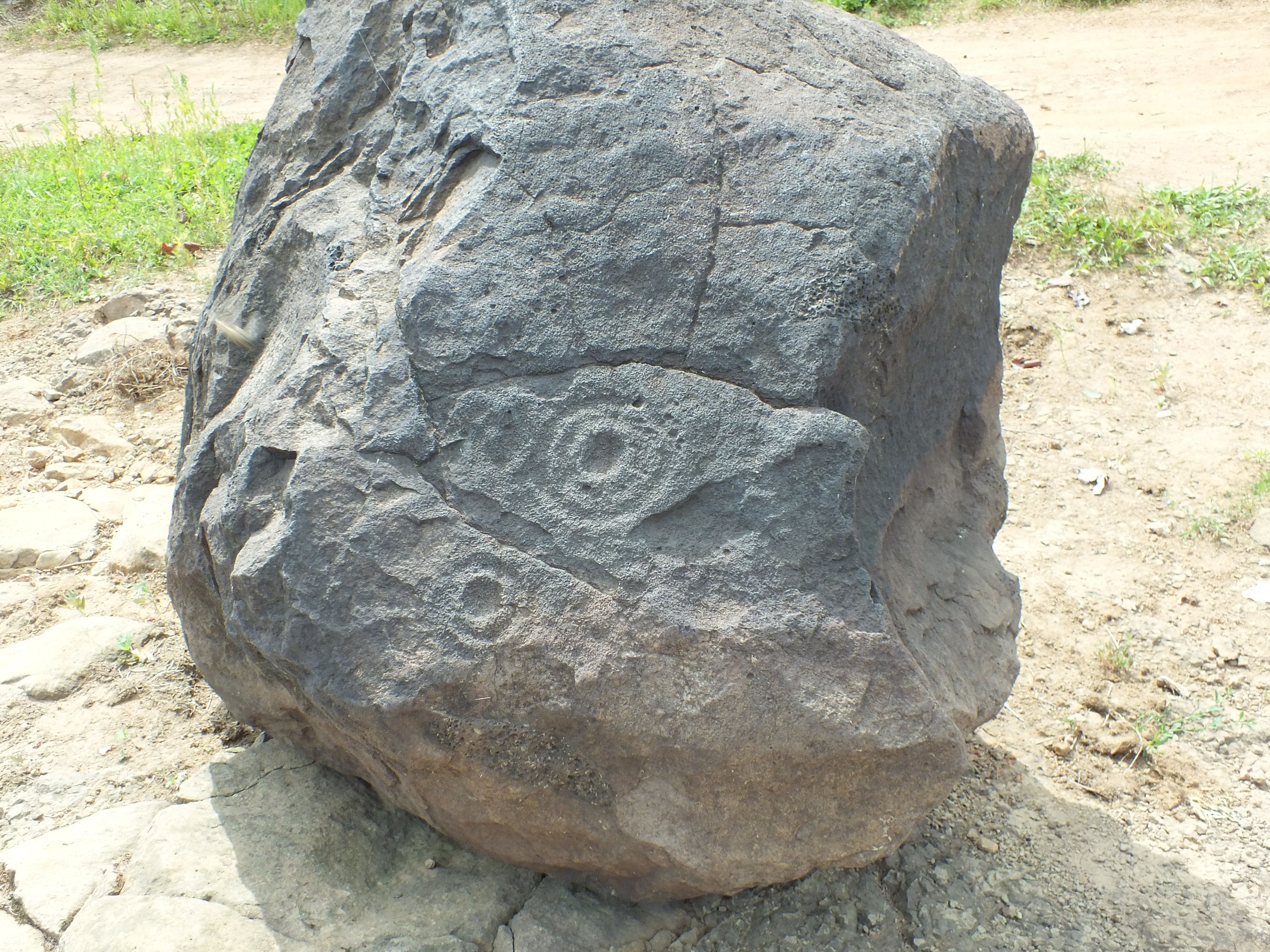
Circles

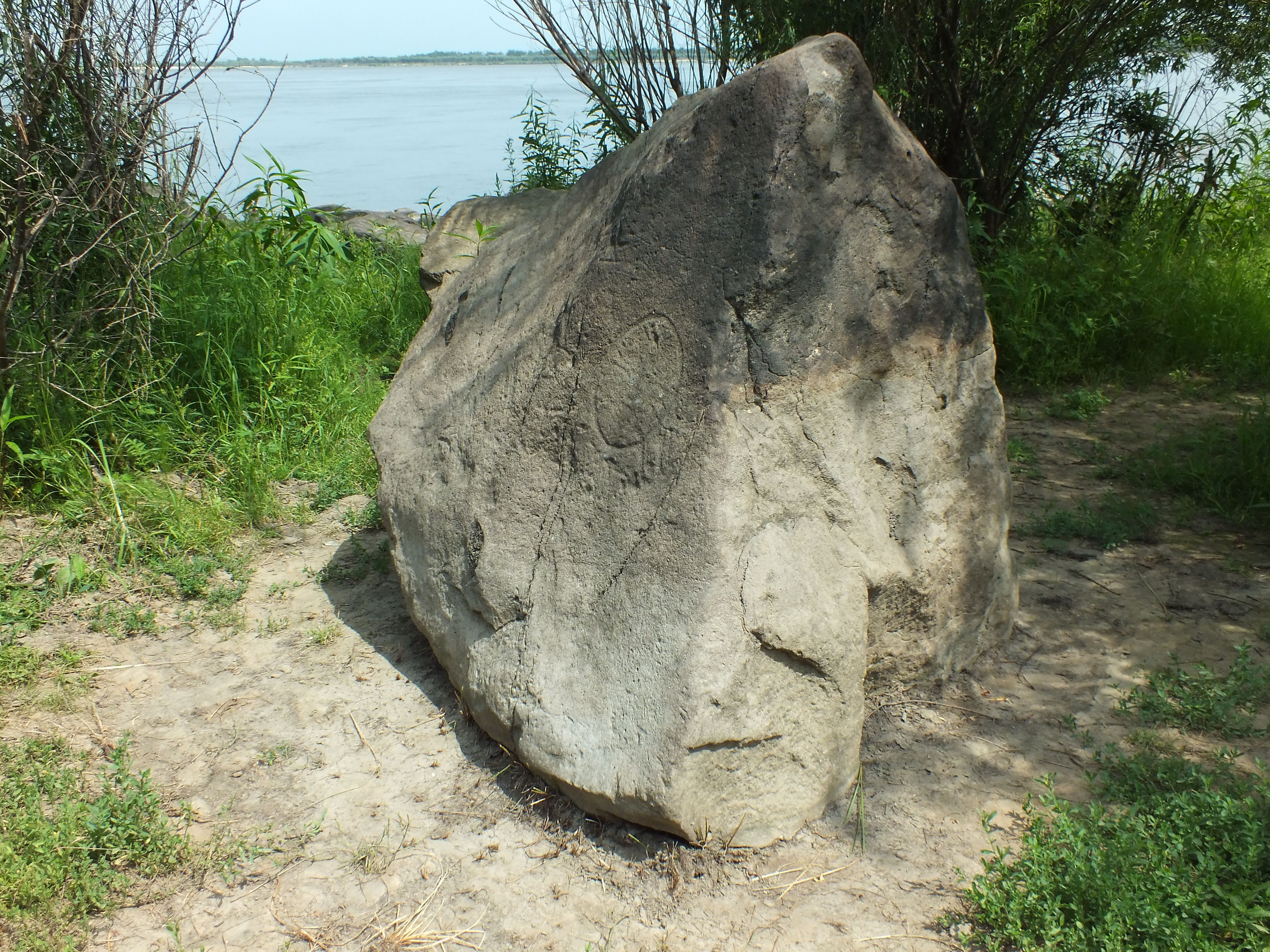
Oval with a pattern

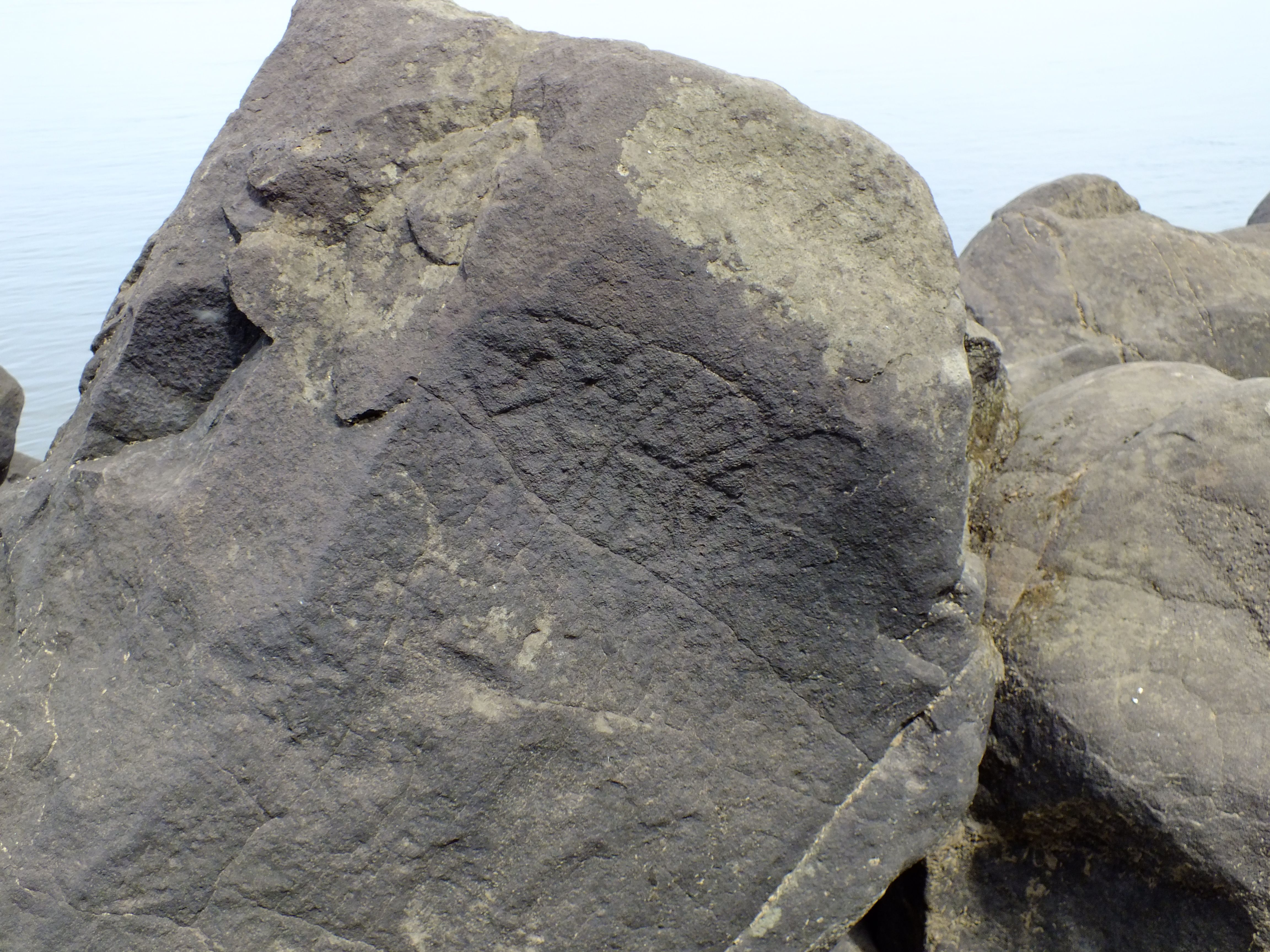
A fish?

== Pictures of the petroglyphs (the upper group) ==
Petroglyphs are located on the Amur river bank upstream from the Sikachi-Alyan village.

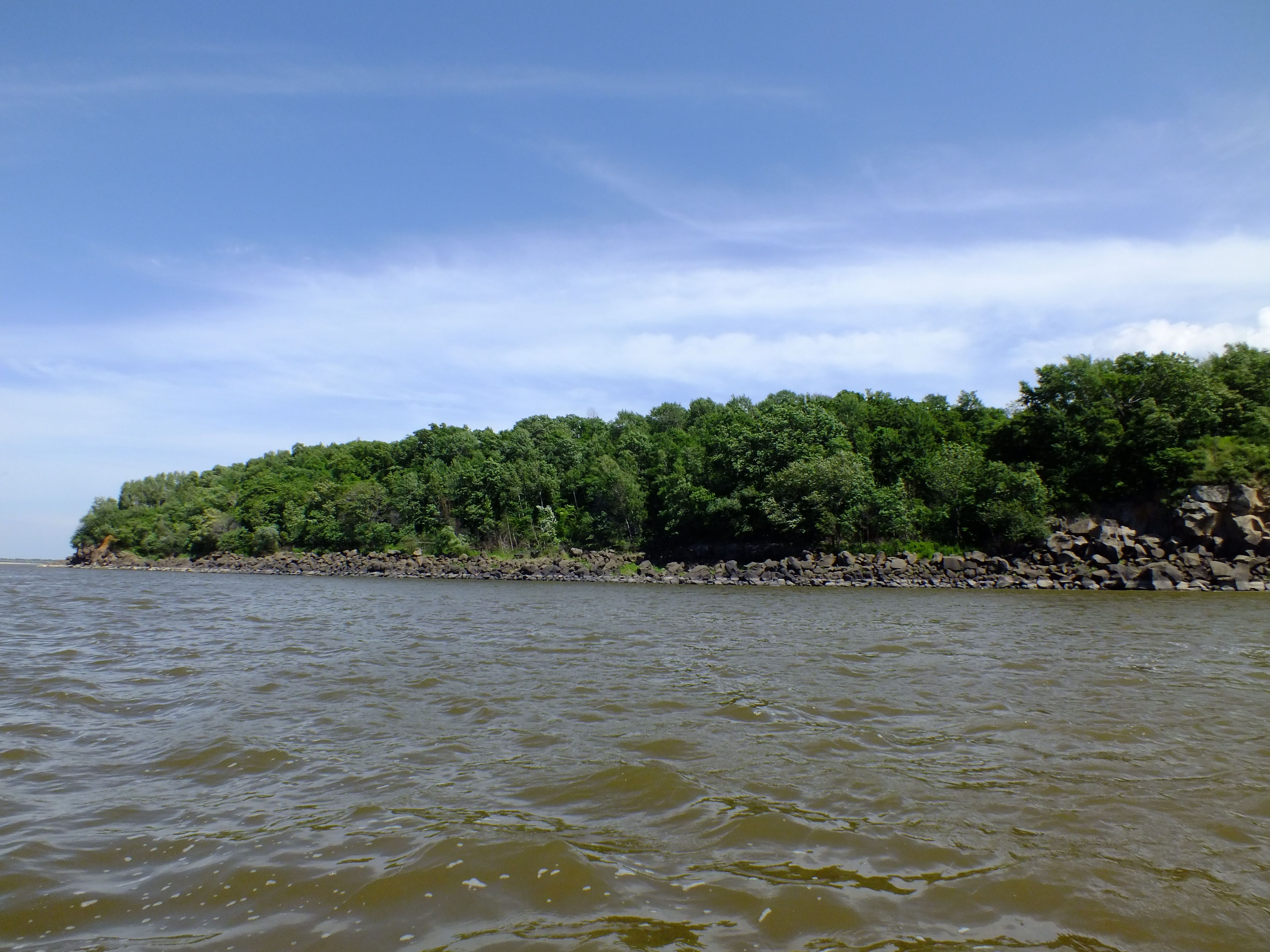
Riverbank near the upper group

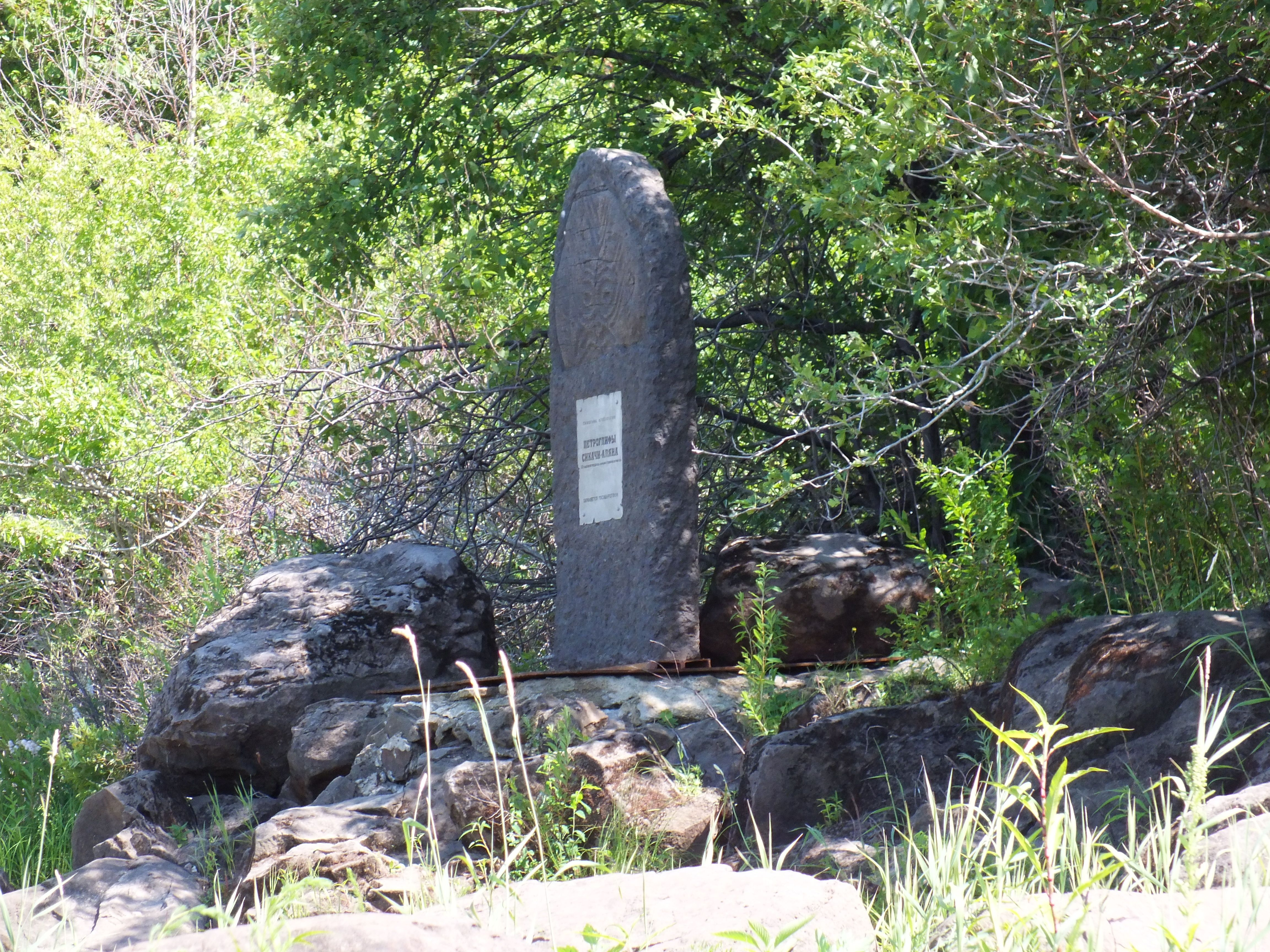
Stella near the upper group

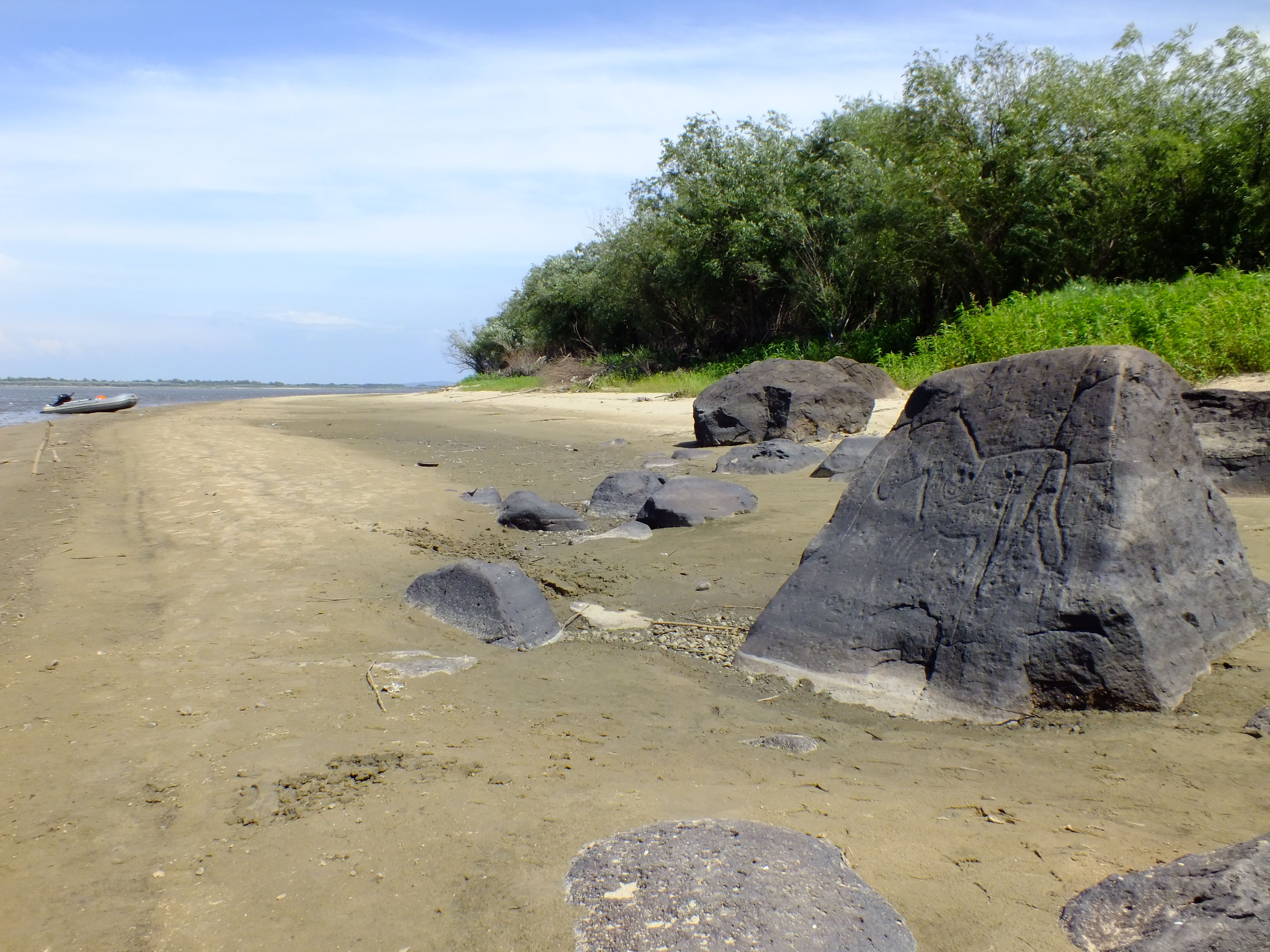
Big horse

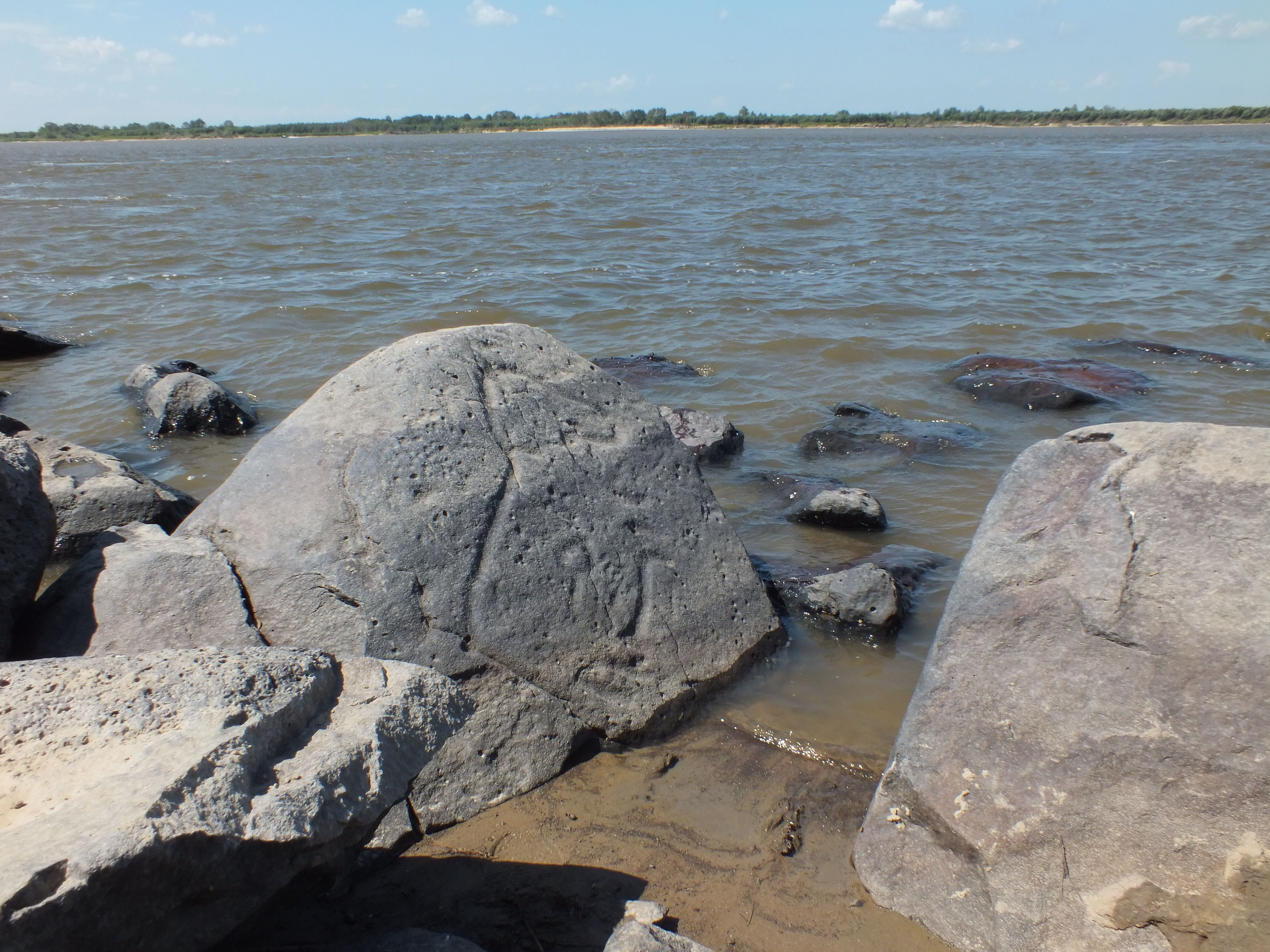
Small horse

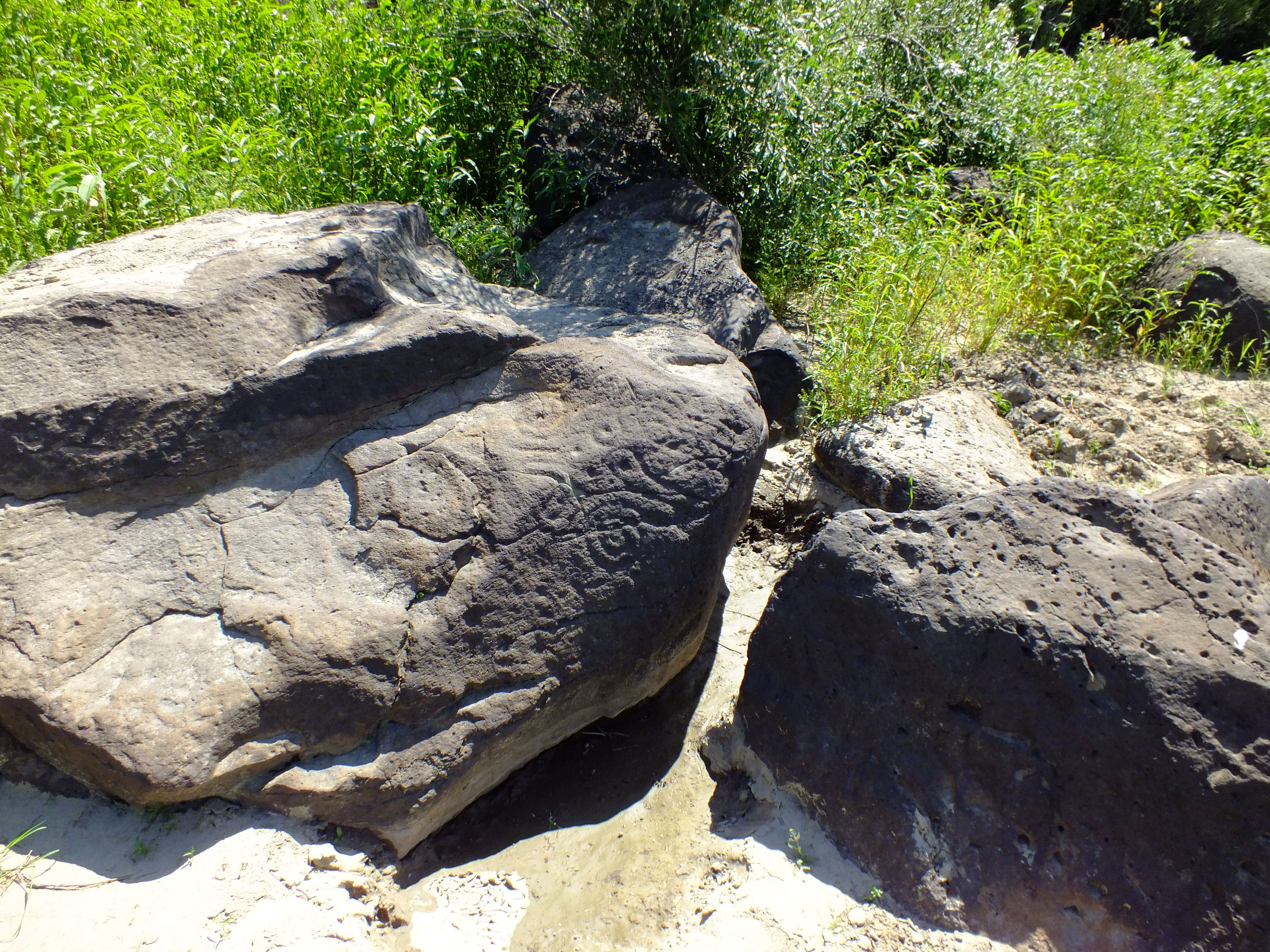
Pattern

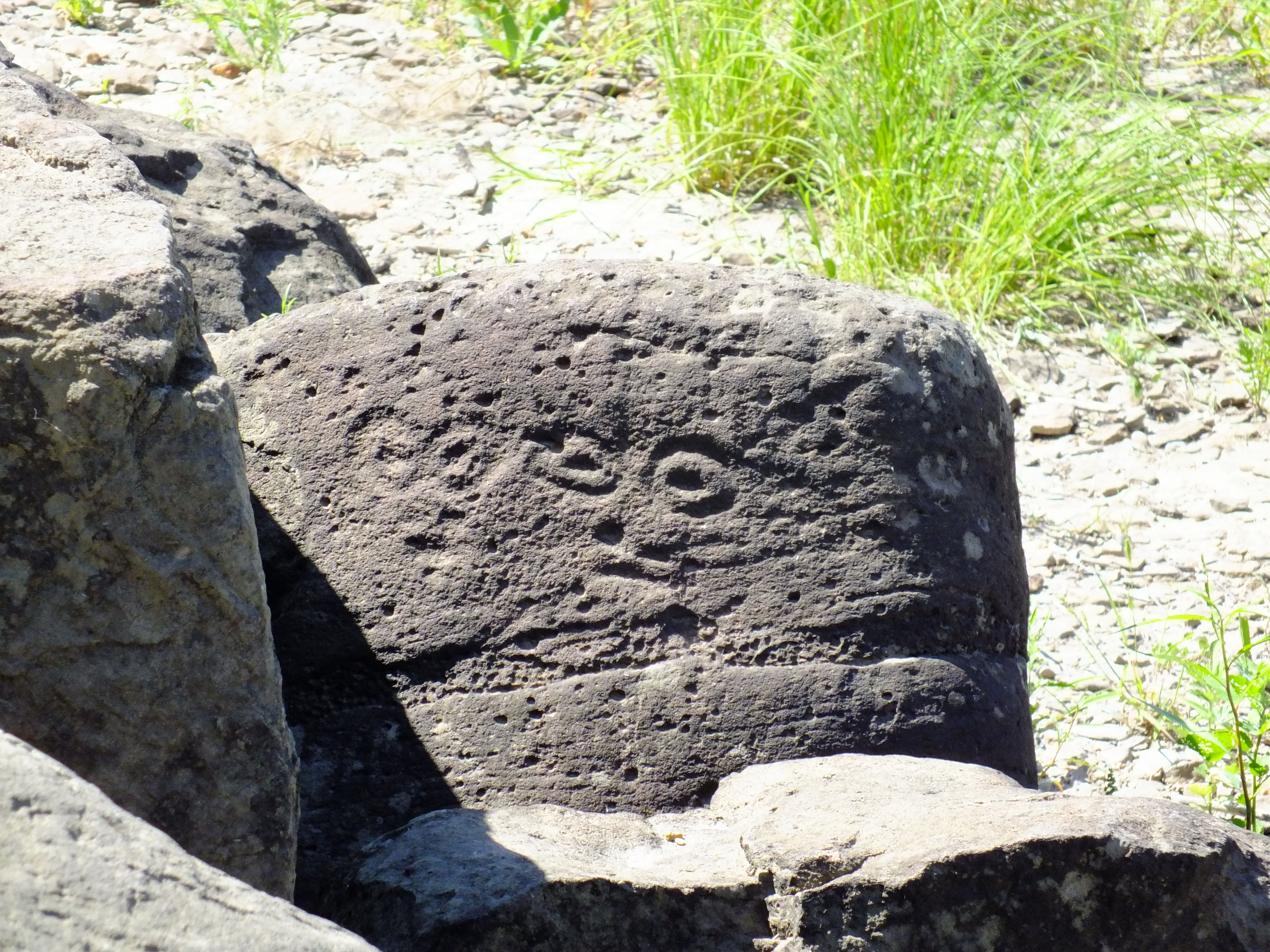
«Eyes»

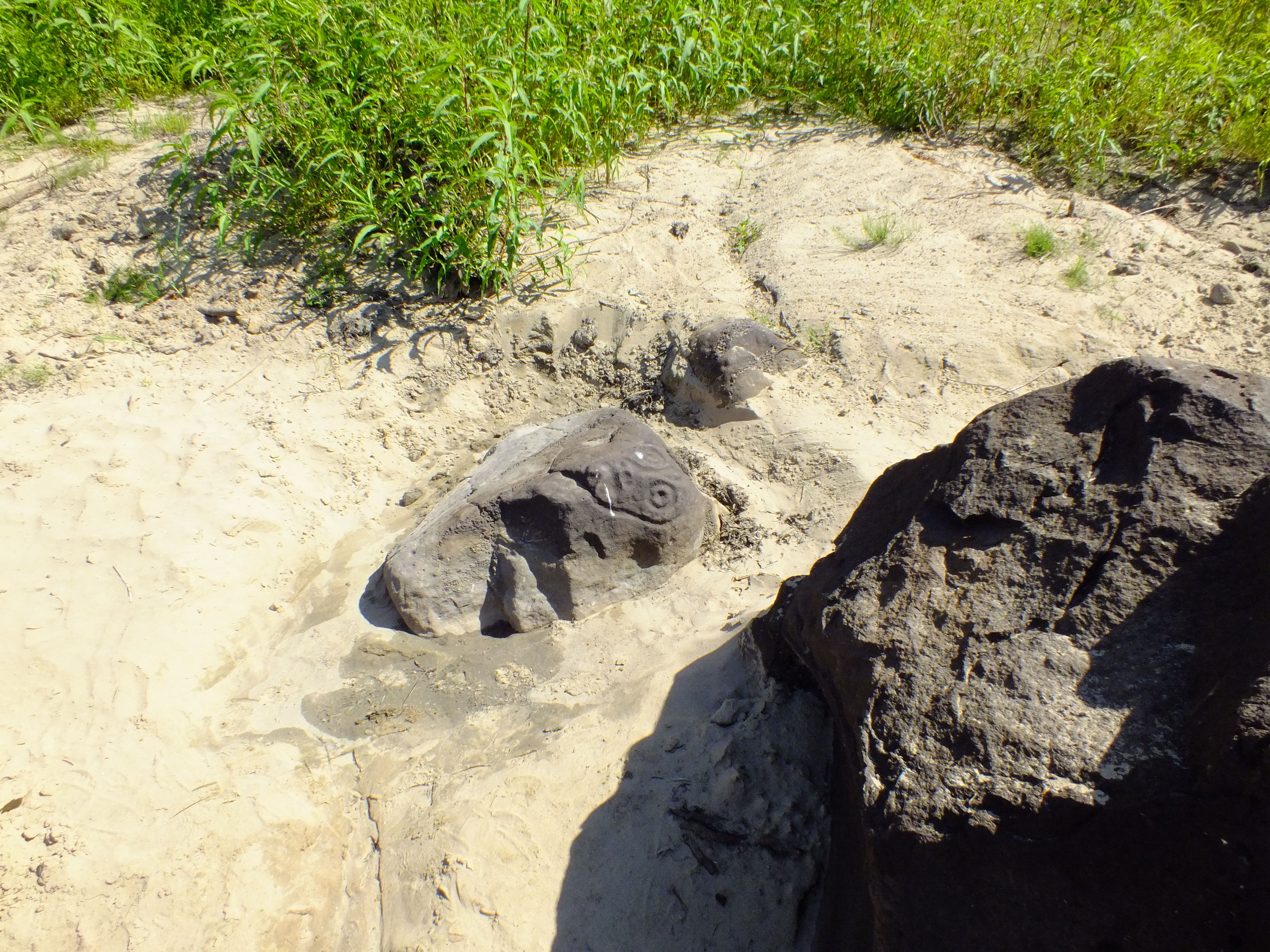
Mask

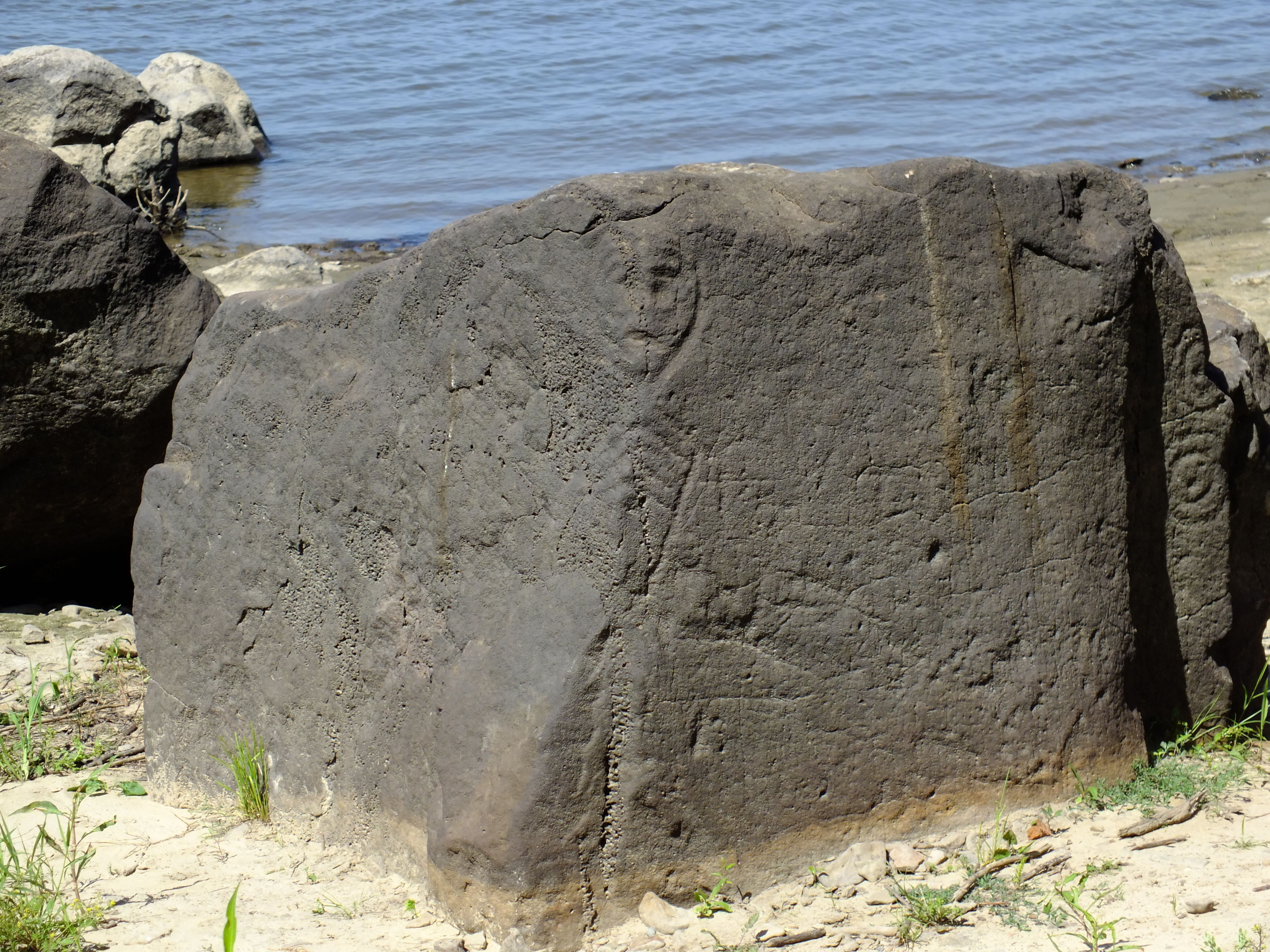
Human silhouette

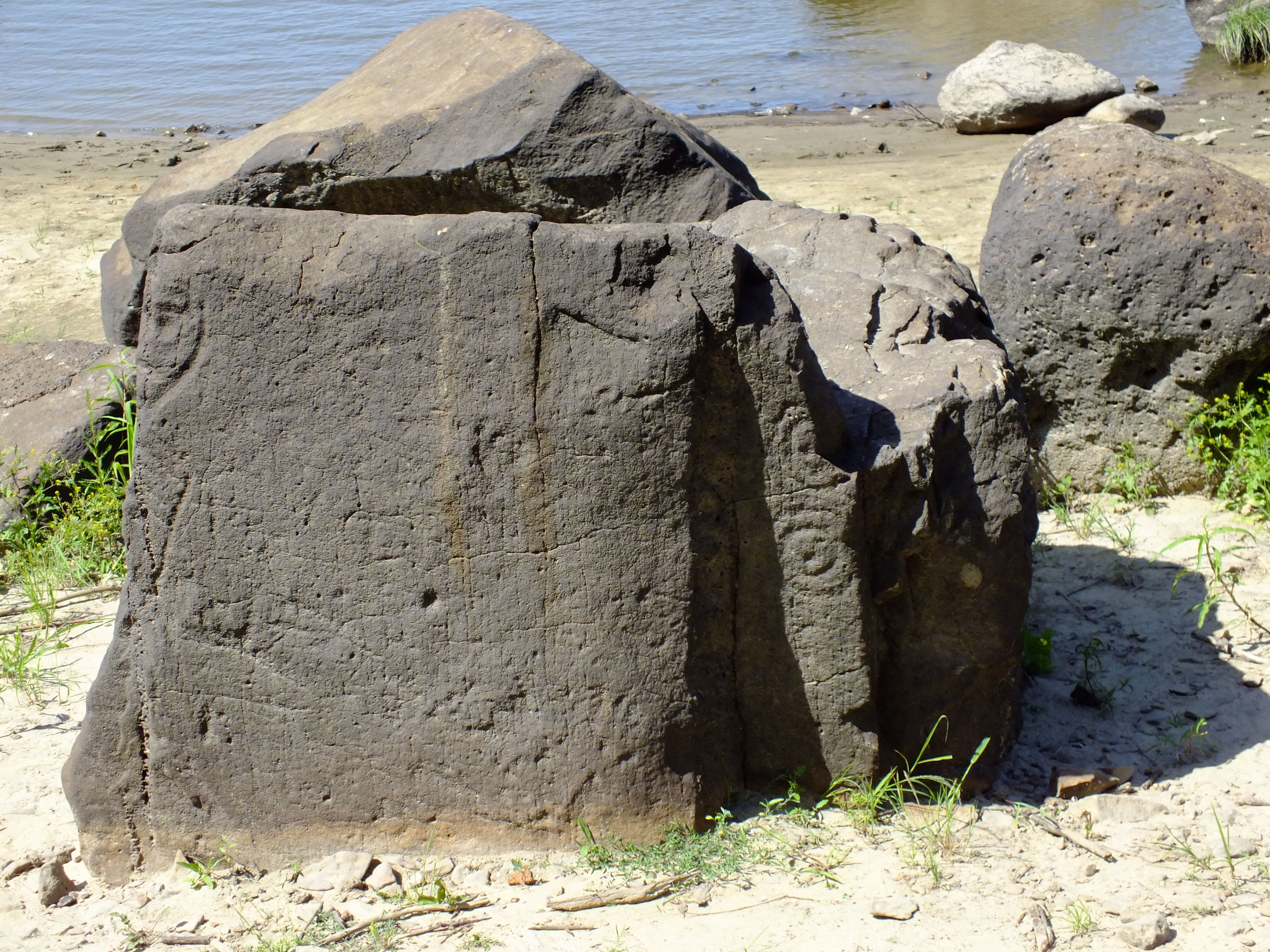
Circles and a Human silhouette

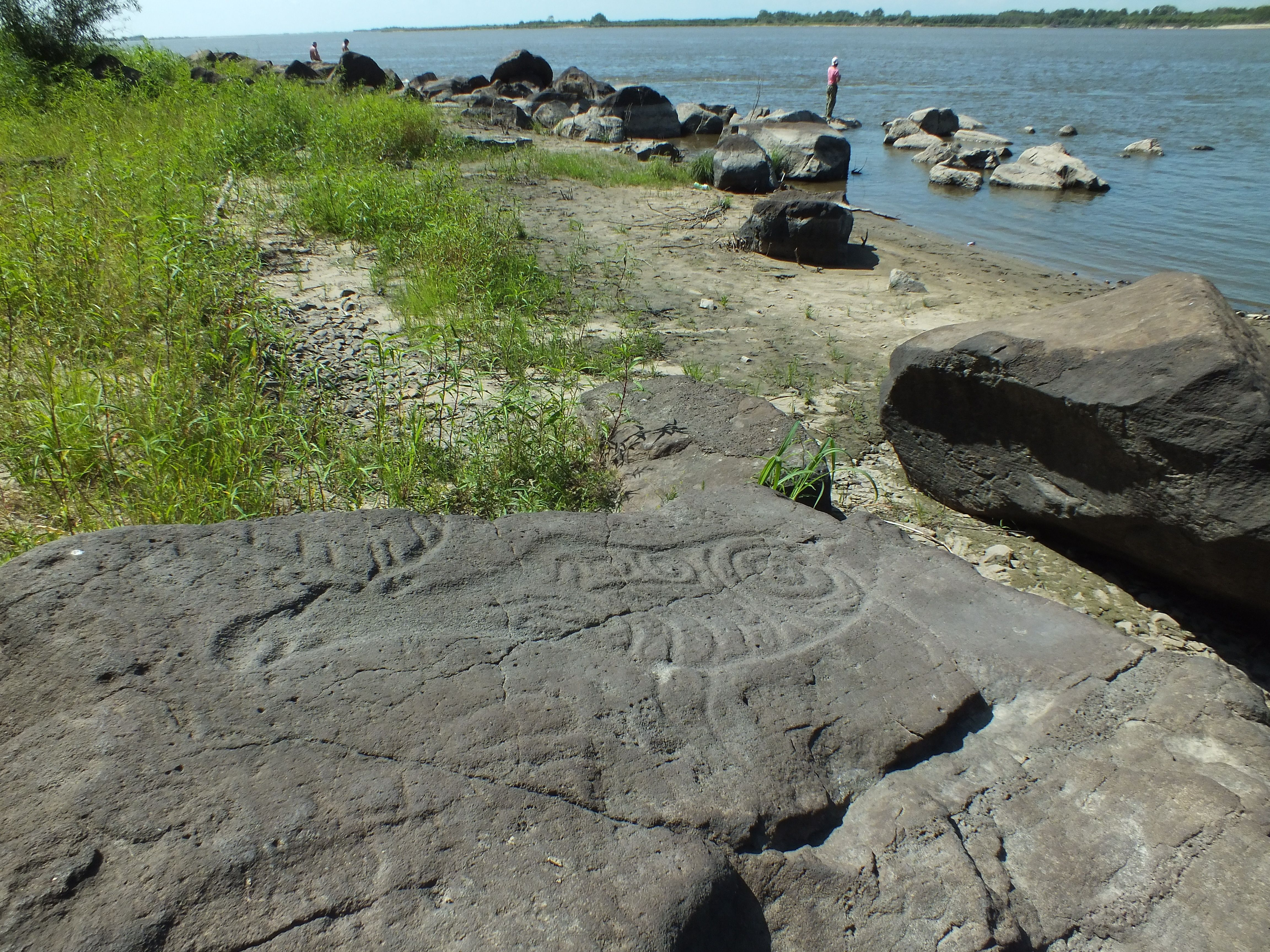
Elk

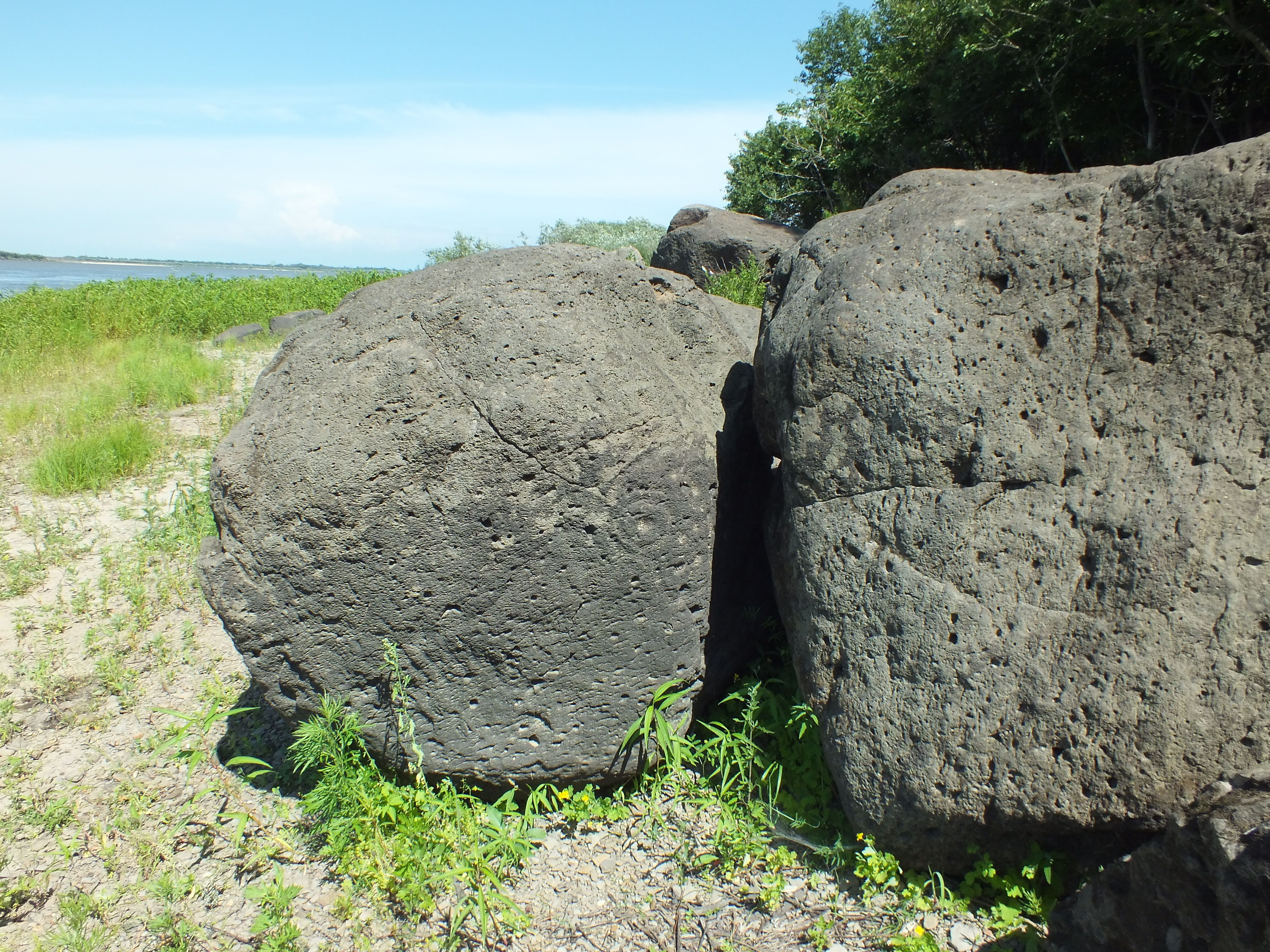
Circle and a pattern

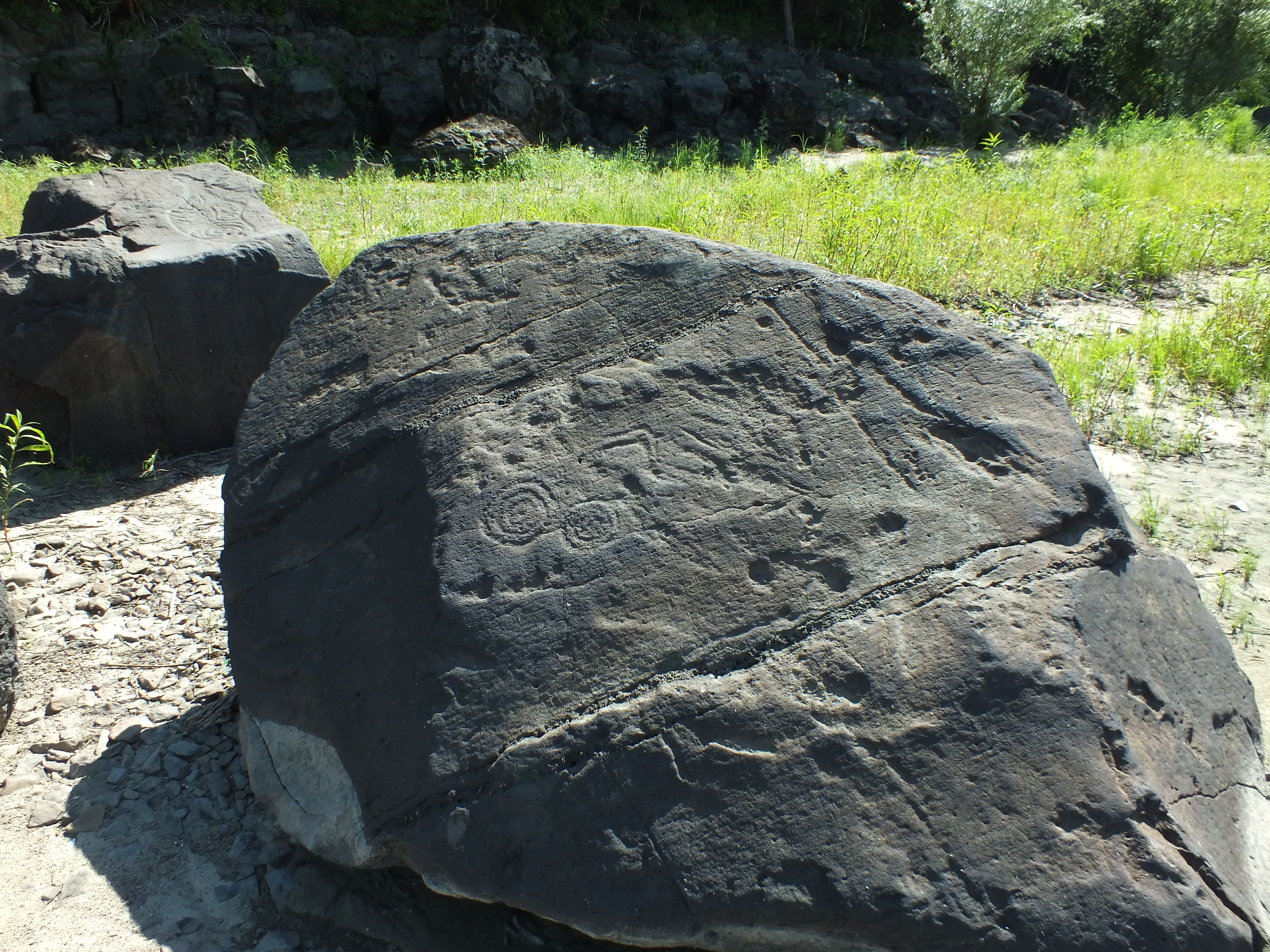
Circles and lines

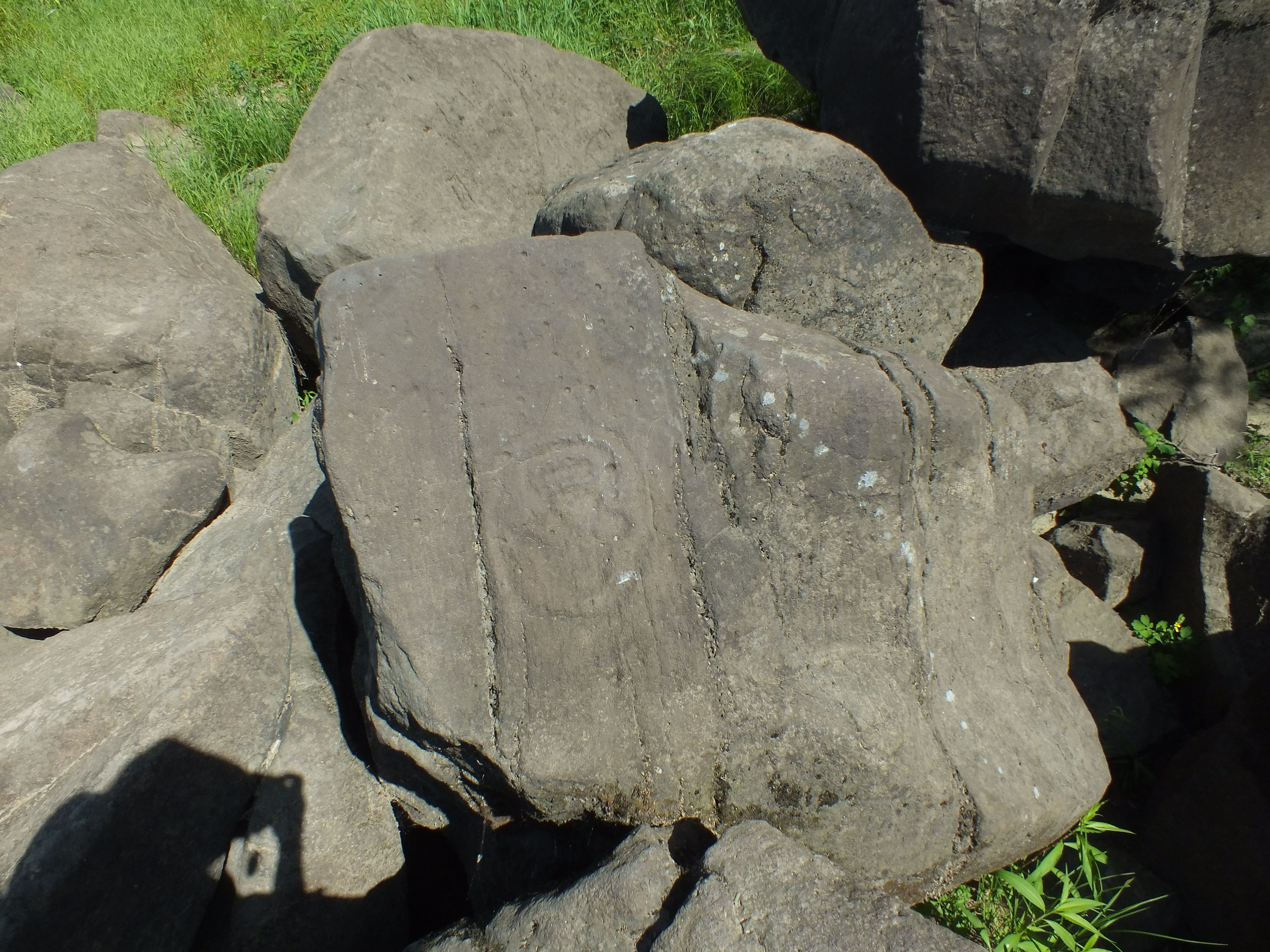
Pattern

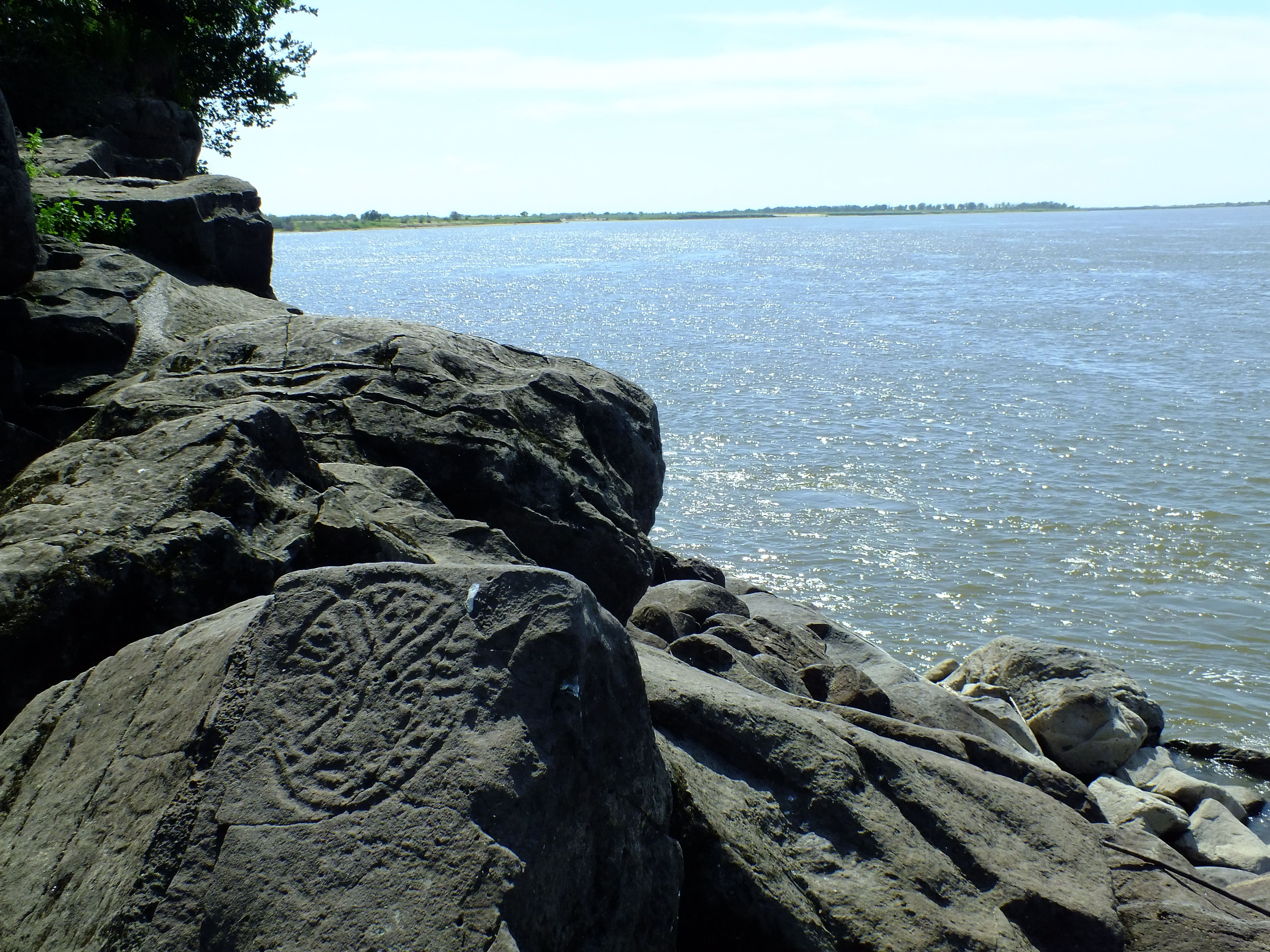
Pattern

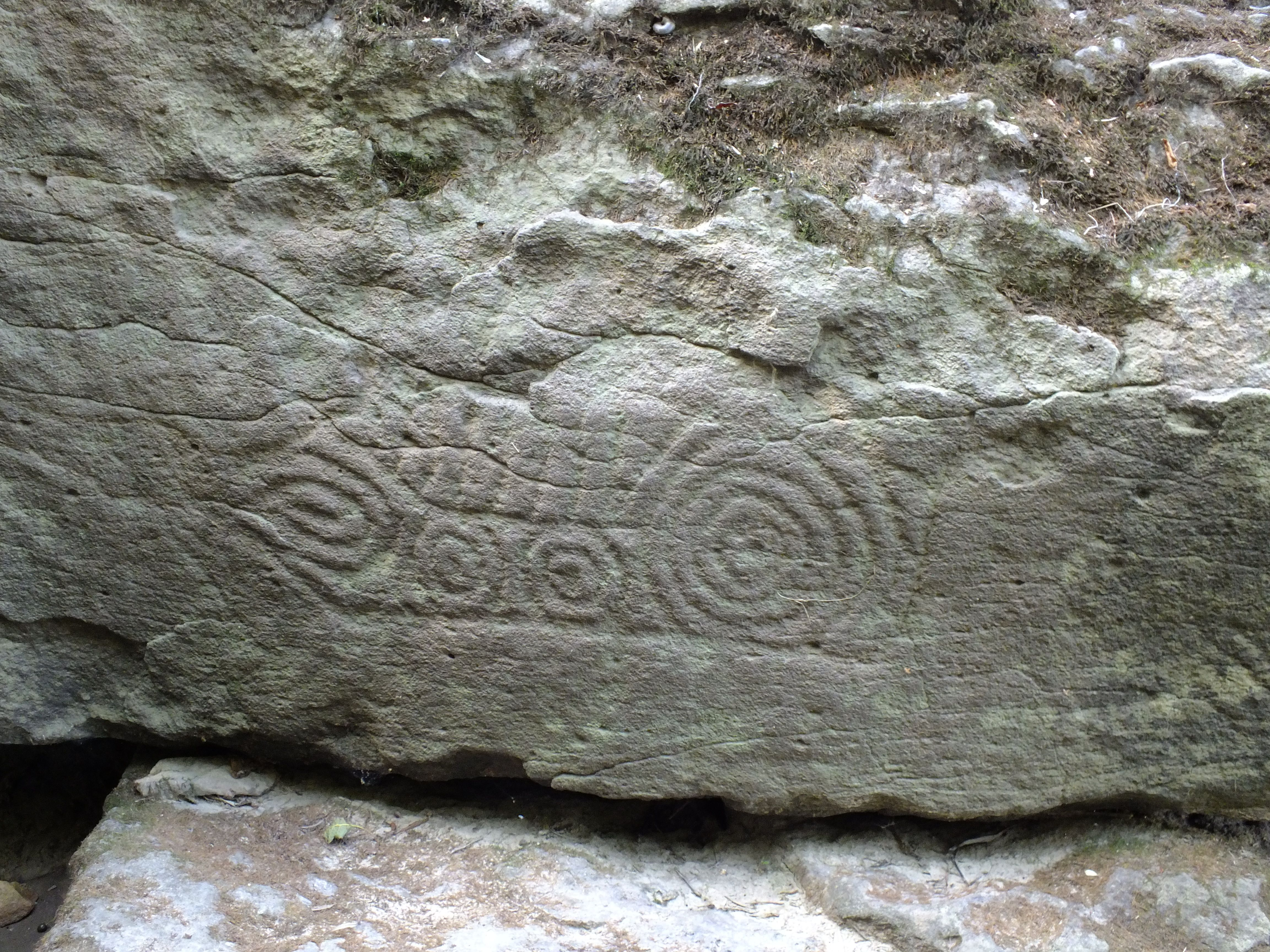
Boat?

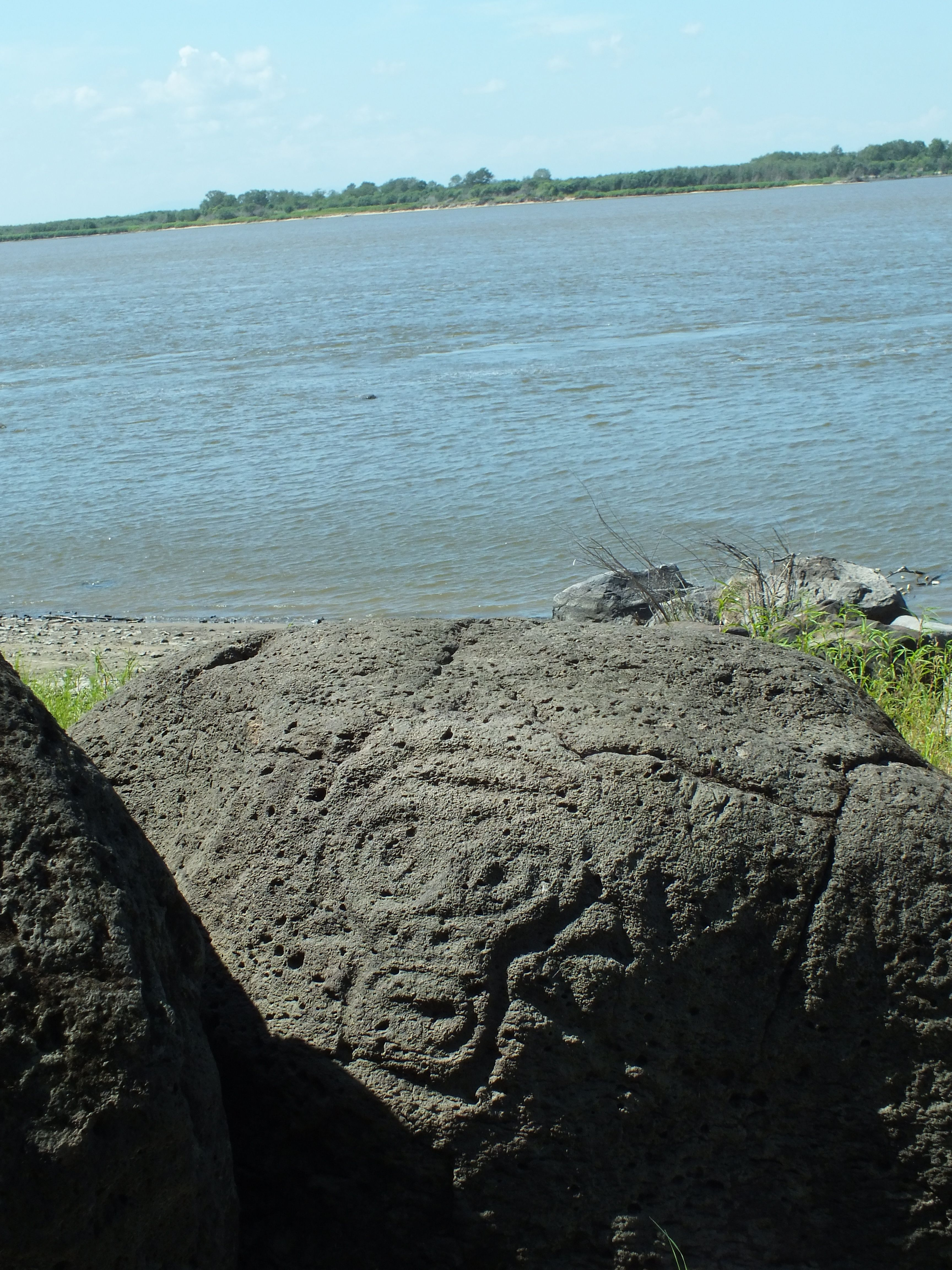
Mask
