= Sikachi-Alyan =

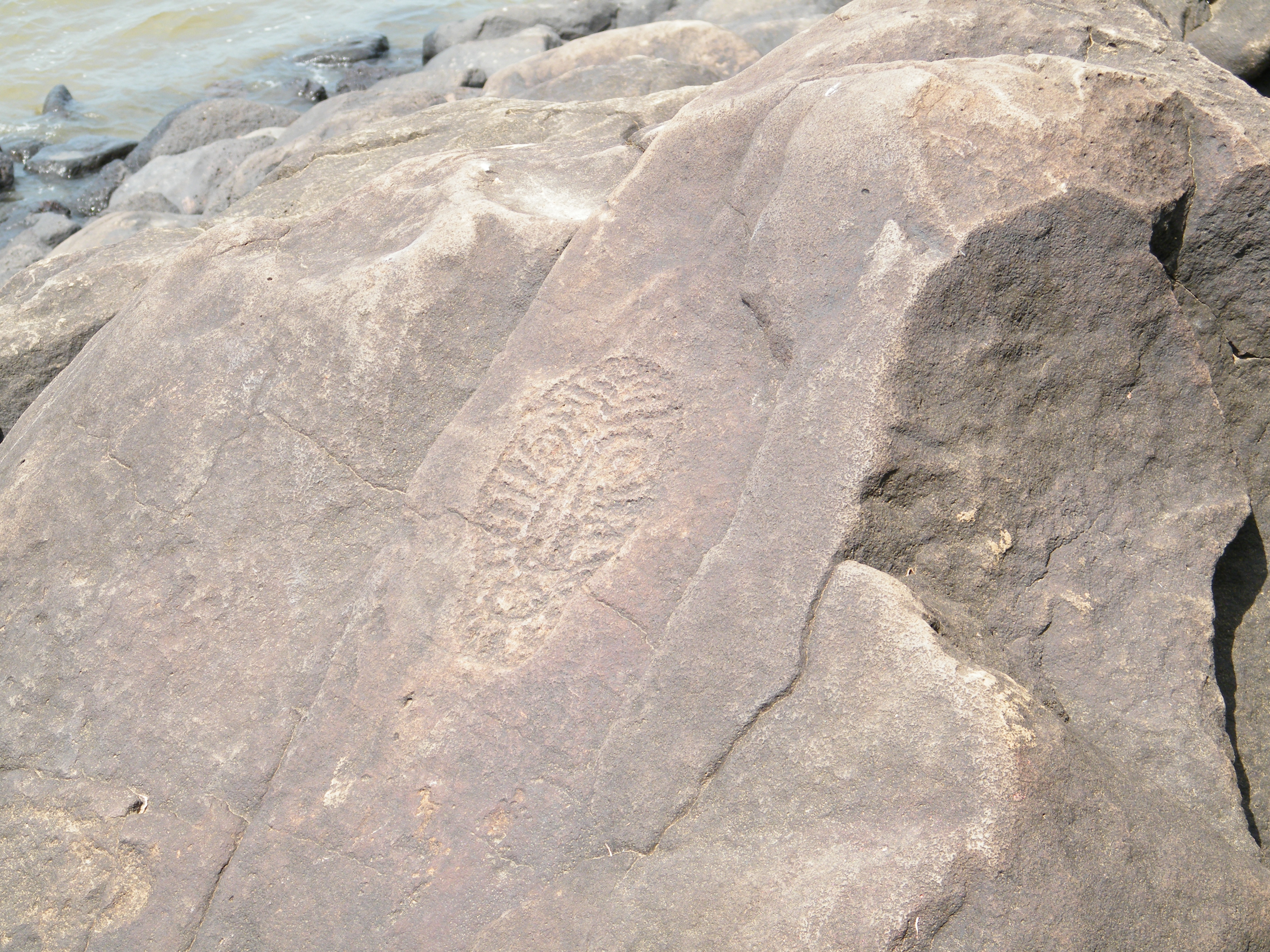
- Petroglyph at Sikachi-Alyan
- Interactive map of Sikachi-Alyan
- 48°44′56″N 135°38′46″E
- Type: Neolithic petroglyph site
- Location: Khabarovsk Krai, Russia

History
- Built: 13th century BC

Site notes
- Website: Server of Khabarovsk Krai government

Sikachi-Alyan is a small Nanai village on the bank of the Amur river located 75 km north of Khabarovsk. The place is famous for its neolithic petroglyphs (masks) carved on the surface of basalt stones. The drawings date back to the 13th century BC. The local findings demonstrate the ancient history of this area. There is a museum and an open-air reconstruction of an ancient village.

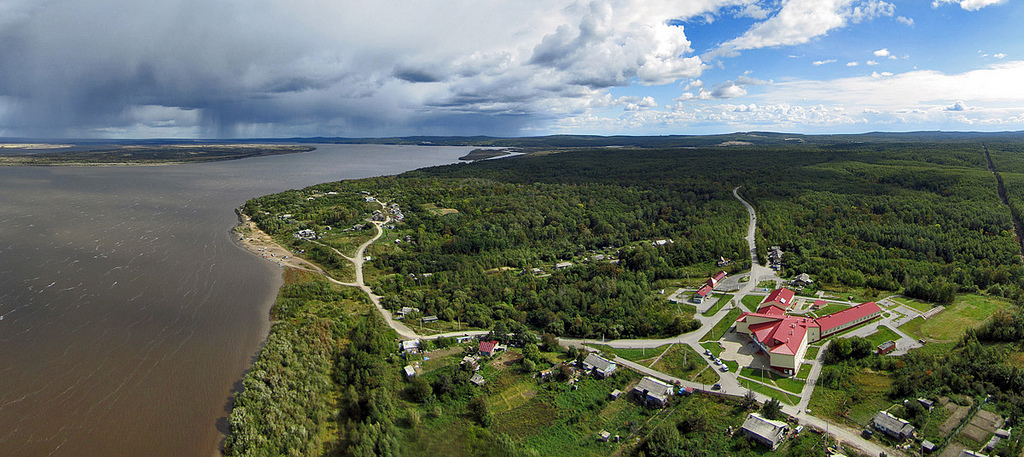
Sikachi-Alyan birdview

== Sources ==
- Museum of Sikachi-Alyan (ru) on YouTube
