= Siege of Pyongyang (668) =

Battle of the Goguryeo-Tang war

- Part of Goguryeo–Tang War
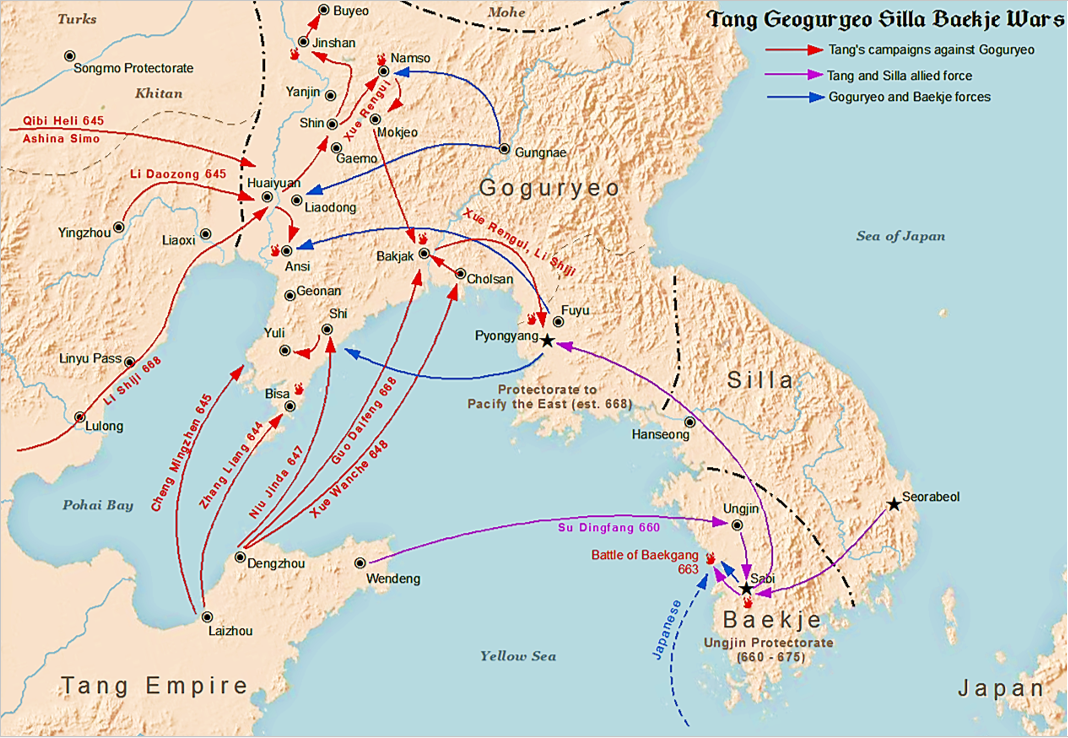
- Map showing the invasion of Goguryeo by the Tang forces from 645 to 668 AD
Date	June - October 22, 668 AD
Location	Pyongyang
Result	Tang-Silla victory
Territorial changes	Fall of Goguryeo and its subsequent annexation by the Tang.

Belligerents
Tang China; Silla	Goguryeo

Commanders and leaders
Li Shiji; Liu Rengui; Xue Rengui; Yeon Namsaeng; Qibi Heli	King Bojang (POW); Yeon Namsan (POW); Yeon Namgeon (POW)

Strength
700,000-1,000,000 total (Note: According to the Samguksagi and other literary sources.); 500,000+ Tang; 200,000 Silla	200,000+ total

Casualties and losses
Unknown	200,000 captured

The Siege of Pyongyang took place in the year 668. Forces of the Tang dynasty of China and the southeastern Korean kingdom of Silla besieged Pyongyang which was the capital of the northern Korean kingdom of Goguryeo. After months of siege, Pyongyang fell to the combined Tang-Silla forces on 22 October 668, putting an end to the 700-year old kingdom of Goguryeo which was directly annexed into the Tang.

== Background ==
The Tang invasion of Goguryeo had been going on since 645, with Goguryeo having already repulsed two previous invasion attempts by the Tang. The previously minor kingdom of Silla also joined the war, opening up a front to the south, conquering the kingdom of Baekje in the process, and along with a Tang naval force defeated a huge Japanese armada intent in restoring Baekje. Despite such moves, however, Goguryeo largely held its ground. This was largely a result of the military campaigns waged and ordered by the grand marshal of Goguryeo Yeon Gaesomun.

However, Yeon Gaesomun died in 666. With his death, his sons, namely Yeon Namsaeng, Yeon Namgeon and Yeon Namsan, begun vying for power, resulting in a quasi-civil war that divided the loyalties of the kingdom's subjects and seriously impaired the war effort as it left the armies of Goguryeo demoralized. The effects of such disorder brought about by the death of the grand marshal were soon felt, for when the main army was sent to relieve some of its major fortresses in the northern part of Goguryeo (currently in present-day Northeast China), it was intercepted and crushed by a Tang army with the help of defectors led by Yeon Namsaeng. Coupled with further defeats, Tang forces overran all Goguryeo fortresses and territories north of the Yalu River by the end of 667.

== Prelude ==
As the war wore on throughout 668, the military situation for Goguryeo continued to rapidly deteriorate. People all over the kingdom were displaced by war and famine, and fortresses are surrendering in rapid succession. The Tang took the northern fortresses while the Silla took the southern ones. By mid-668, only the capital fortress city of Pyongyang remained.

== Siege ==
The Turkic Tang general Qibi Heli was the first to arrive outside Pyongyang on June 668 with his vanguard force largely composed of Xiongnu and Gokturk auxiliaries as well as Mohe defectors from Goguryeo itself. Soon he was joined by the supreme commander Li Shiji and his main force. While Tang forces were blockading Pyongyang since June, Silla forces marched from the south by the end of July. It defeated an attempted Goguryeo sortie in Sacheonbeol south of Pyongyang before eventually arriving outside the city in 21 September 668. According to the Samguksagi and subsequent Korean and some Chinese literary sources, the Tang have brought an excess of 500,000 (Note: According to a Korean literary reading and rendition of the Prime Tortoise of the Record Bureau, pertaining to the Tang dynasty.) to upwards of 1 million men for the operation, although this was certainly an exaggeration when taking into account the logistic capabilities of the kingdoms of the era. The same could be said for the Silla which was claimed to have brought 200,000 men to the siege even though it only had less than a million inhabitants during the war.

Recognizing the situation as hopeless and futile, the last king of Goguryeo, Bojang, ordered Yeon Namsan to raise the white flag and along with him surrender together with other officials. They then exited the city and submitted themselves to the Tang forces and in front of its supreme commander Li Shiji who along with his staff received their submission with courtesy. However, Yeon Namgeon refused to surrender, sealing the city shut and continued fighting. This act of defiance was not to last, for the Buddhist monk Sinseong opened the city's gates then subsequently surrendered. Yeon Namgeon tried killing himself with his own sword but was captured by Tang forces. By 22 October 668, the siege was finally over, with the city falling over to the control of the Tang forces.

== Aftermath ==
With the fall of Pyongyang came the end of the centuries-old kingdom of Goguryeo. The Tang directly annexed all of Goguryeo and placed it under a military administration with the newly-created Protectorate General to Pacify the East. Over 200,000 prisoners including the last king Bojang and his royal litter were taken by the Tang forces from Pyongyang and sent to Chang'an where they were later assigned roles to serve the Tang government.

== Bibliography ==
- Ebrey, Patricia Buckley; Walthall, Anne; Palais, James B. (2006). East Asia: A cultural, social, and political history. Boston: Houghton Mifflin. ISBN 9780618133840.
- Farris, William Wayne (1985). Population, disease, and land in early Japan, 645–900. Cambridge: Harvard University Press. ISBN 9780674690059.
- Fuqua, Jacques L. (2007). Nuclear endgame: The need for engagement with North Korea. Westport: Praeger Security International. ISBN 9780275990749.
- Graff, David A. (2002). Medieval Chinese Warfare, 300–900. London: Routledge. ISBN 9780415239554.
- Joe, Wanne J. (1972). Traditional Korea: A Cultural History. Seoul: Chung'ang University Press.
- Kim, Djun Kil (2005). The history of Korea (1st ed.). Westport: Greenwood Press. ISBN 9780313038532.
- Lee, Kenneth B. (1997). Korea and East Asia: The story of a phoenix. Westport: Praeger. ISBN 9780275958237.
- Lewis, Mark Edward (2009). China's cosmopolitan empire: The Tang dynasty. Cambridge: Harvard University Press. ISBN 9780674033061.
- Ota, Fumio (2012). "The Japanese way of war". The Oxford handbook on war. Corby: Oxford University Press. ISBN 9780199562930.
- Seth, Michael J. (2010). A history of Korea: From antiquity to the present. Lanham: Rowman & Littlefield. ISBN 9780742567177.
- Wang, Zhenping (2013). Tang China in Multi-Polar Asia: A History of Diplomacy and War. University of Hawaii Press.
- West, Barbara A. (2009). Encyclopedia of the peoples of Asia and Oceania. New York: Facts On File. ISBN 9781438119137.
- Yu, Chai-Shin (2012). The new history of Korean civilization. Bloomington: iUniverse. ISBN 9781462055593.
