= Battle of Geumsan =

662 conflict during the Goguryeo–Tang War

- Part of Goguryeo–Tang War
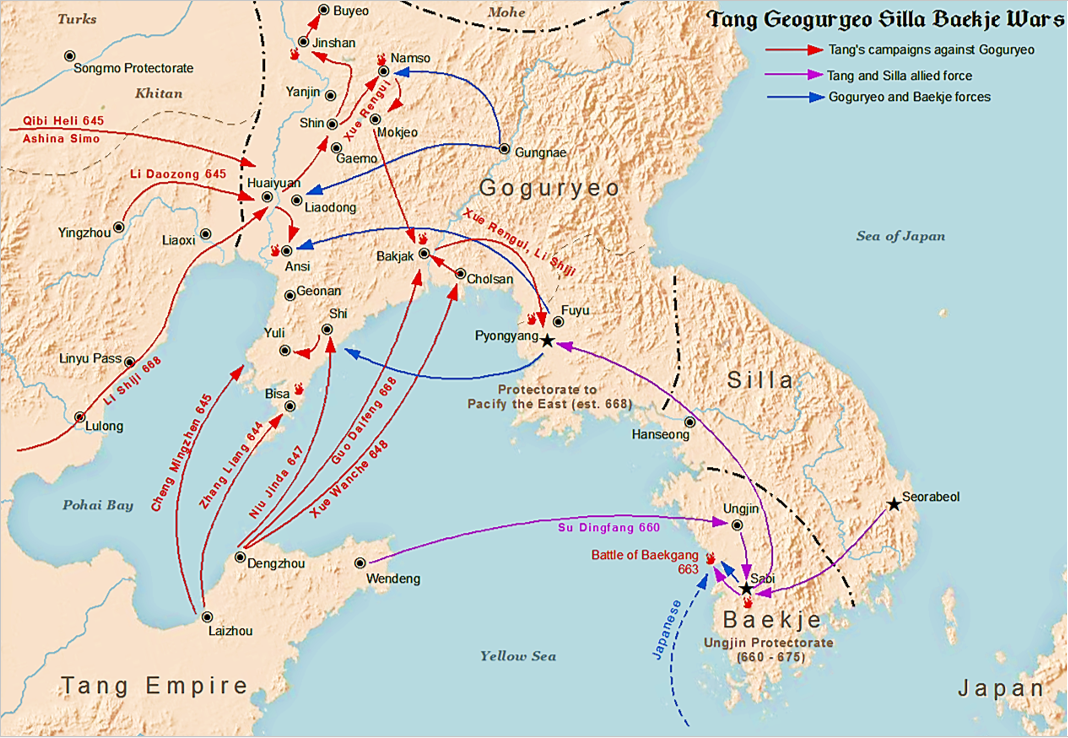
- Map showing the invasion of Goguryeo by the Tang forces from 645 to 668 AD
Date	c. October 667 AD
Location	Geumsan Fortress, Goguryeo (present-day Changtu County, Liaoning Province, China)
Result	Tang victory

Belligerents
Tang China	Goguryeo Korea

Commanders and leaders
Xue Rengui; Yŏn Namsaeng; Pang Tongshan; Gao Kan	Yŏn Namsan

Strength
250,000 total; 150,000 Chinese soldiers; 100,000 Goguryeo defectors	150,000-200,000

Casualties and losses
Unknown	50,000 killed

The Battle of Geumsan, was a major battle between armies of Tang China and Goguryeo Korea that took place in 662 AD, during the Goguryeo–Tang War. Goguryeo initially won the battle but Tang eventually counterattacked and routed the enemy, laying victorious.

== Prelude ==
The war between the Chinese Tang Empire and the Korean kingdom of Goguryeo has been raging continuously for two decades since 645. The previous two invasions by the Tang were unsuccessful and have resulted in immense losses for both sides.

In 666, the long-time military dictator of Goguryeo Yŏn Kaesomun died, and infighting developed between his eldest son Yŏn Namsaeng, who succeeded him, and his two younger sons Yŏn Namgŏn and Yŏn Namsan, over suspicions that they had for each other. Eventually, Yŏn Namgŏn claimed the post of dictatorship for himself while Yŏn Namsaeng was away from the capital Pyongyang. The two brothers then forced the king Bojang to arrest Yŏn Namsaeng. Unable to reclaim the dictatorship for himself and now a political fugitive, Yŏn Namsaeng was left with no choice and eventually defected to the Tang along with 100,000 Goguryeo soldiers. He sent his son Yŏn Hŏnsŏng to seek aid from the Tang. The Emperor of China Gaozong then sent an 80,000-strong army led by generals Xue Rengui, Li Shiji and Qibi Heli based in Liaodong to rendezvous with the defectors. After taking the Goguryeo cities of Namseo (in present-day Tieling, Liaoning), Mokjeo (in present-day Fushun), and Changam (in present-day Benxi, Liaoning), the Tang army and Goguryeo defectors finally met at the fortress of Shin.

Yŏn Namsaeng provided valuable intelligence on the military system and fortifications of Goguryeo to the Tang court at Chang'an. Emperor Gaozong then increased the Tang expeditionary army to 150,000 men.

Tang forces with the help of Yŏn Namsaeng have finally captured the fortress of Shin (in present-day Shenyang, China), the strongest fortress in the northern frontier of Goguryeo, in 14 September 667. Qibi Heli was then ordered by Li Shiji to hold the fortress to be used as a base and springboard for further offensive operations against Goguryeo. In October 667 the Tang forces went on to attack Buyeo (present-day Nong'an County, part of Changchun, Jilin), the last city in the north of Goguryeo that has not fallen yet. In response, Yŏn Namgŏn gathered all the armies across the kingdom numbering 200,000 men to restore the northern front and sent it to intercept the Tang army to prevent Buyeo from falling. Leading this army is Yŏn Namgŏn's brother Yŏn Namsan and it included the most elite troops Goguryeo could spare.

== Battle ==
The vanguard of the Tang army, commanded by generals Pang Tongshan and Gao Kan, were near the fortress of Geumsan (Korean: 금산성 Geumsan-seong, Chinese: 金山 Jīnshān, in present-day Changtu County, Liaoning) which was on their path heading to Buyeo, when the Goguryeo army led by Yŏn Namsan recently arrived. The larger Goguryeo army promptly attacked the Tang army, routing it off the field and inflicting heavy losses on it. But the army led by Xue Rengui along with defectors led by Yŏn Namsaeng managed to arrive just in time, attacking the Goguryeo army from the flank; they have been keeping track of the enemy the whole time. The routed Tang vanguard then rallied and counterattacked, thence the combined Tang army now have the numerical superiority over the enemy. The Goguryeo army was routed, with 50,000 killed.

== Aftermath ==
The Tang army took the fortress of Geumsan after the battle, then went further north to seize Buyeo. The remnants of the Goguryeo army at Buyeo, still 100,000 men strong, tried attacking the fortress of Shin further south to cut the Tang forces off from their supply lines, but was intercepted by the Tang army. It was winter time and the fields were white with snow and both sides encamped as they took to winter quarters. Xue Rengui had his 2,000-strong elite cavalry wear white robes as camouflage and had it charged onto the unsuspecting Goguryeo camp, killing 20,000 soldiers and routing the rest back to Buyeo. Buyeo fell 20 February 668, and Xue Rengui sent letters for the 40 fortresses around Buyeo demanding their surrender. They surrendered, and the Tang army went on to secure the area adjacent to the Sea of Japan.
