= Yeon =

- Hangul: 연
- Hanja: 燕, 延, 連
- RR: Yeon
- MR: Yŏn

Yeon (연), or less commonly Youn or Yŏn, is a Korean surname. The name may correspond to the Chinese surnames Yan (燕, 延) or Lian (連). The hanja 延 is much more common than 燕 and 連. Yeon may also refer to the extinct surname (淵).

== Origin ==
=== 燕 ===
燕 (제비 연 jebi yeon) was the surname of the Yeon clan, one of the Great Eight Families of Baekje. This surname is extremely rare in the present-day with a few clans such as the Jeonju Yeon clan and the Jeongpyeong Yeon clan. The character literally means barn swallow. According to the 2015 census, 20 people had this surname.

=== 延 ===
延 (늘일 연 neuril yeon) is the most common hanja character used for the surname "Yeon". The most common bon-gwan is the Goksan Yeon clan (곡산 연씨), whose ancestor Yeon Gye-ryeong originated from Hongnong Commandery and later went to Goryeo. According to the 2015 census, 34,766 people had this surname.

=== 連 ===
The Naju Yeon clan uses the hanja character (連, 잇닿을 연 itdaeul yeon) to denote their surname. They are the descendants of Yeon Ju, who contributed to the founding of Goryeo. According to the 2015 census, 59 people had this surname.

=== 淵 (Extinct) ===
Yeon (淵) was the surname of Yŏn Kaesomun, a general of Goguryeo. It became extinct when this family emigrated to the Tang dynasty, with the remaining family members changing their surname due to the naming taboo; the personal name of the first Tang emperor, Li Yuan (李淵) used the character, 淵 and it was illegal for one's surname to be the same as the emperor's name. *Yeon (guess what) (born 2006), Valorant Player

== Notable people ==
- Yŏn Kaesomun (594–666), Goguryeo military leader
- Yeon Gyu-jin, South Korean actor
- Yŏn Chayu, Goguryeo statesman and grandfather of Yŏn Kaesomun
- Yeon Joon-seok (born 1995), South Korean actor
- Yeon Jung-hoon (born 1978), South Korean actor and television personality
- Kwangchul Youn (born 1966), South Korean operatic bass based in Germany
- Yeon Sang-ho (born 1978), South Korean film director and screenwriter
- Yŏn T'aejo, Goguryeo statesman and father of Yŏn Kaesomun
- Steven Yeun (born 1983), American actor
