= Yŏn Chayu =

Korean politician

Prime Minister Yŏn Chayu Mangnigi
- 연자유

Prime Minister of Goguryeo
- In office ?
- Preceded by: Ch'ang Chori
- Succeeded by: Yŏn T'aejo

- Yŏn Chayu
- Hangul: 연자유
- Hanja: 淵子遊
- RR: Yeon Jayu
- MR: Yŏn Chayu

Yŏn Chayu (Korean: 연자유; Hanja: 淵子遊, ? – ?) was the Mangniji (Prime Minister) of Goguryeo during its waning days. He was the grandfather of Yŏn Kaesomun, who was Tae Mangniji and dictator of Goguryeo before its fall. Yŏn Chayu was the father of Yŏn T'aejo, the father of Yŏn Kaesomun, and Mangniji after Chayu . Historical records do not provide his life dates or his actions as Mangniji.

== Background ==
Not much is known about Yŏn Chayu's background except that his ancestor was said to have been "born in the water." Historians have tried to translate this text, and have established that the Yŏn ancestor may have been born at sea or near a river. It is apparent that his family was a very powerful one in Goguryeo, having led the Eastern province of Goguryeo kingdom for an unknown number of generations.

== Legacy ==
After the death of Yŏn Chayu, his eldest son Yŏn T'aejo succeeded him to the positions of Mangniji and Taedaero of the Eastern province of Goguryeo kingdom. After the death of Yŏn T'aejo, his eldest son Yŏn Kaesomun was refused his rightful positions by the other nobles of Goguryeo, and had to stage a coup that overthrew the King Yeongnyu at the time. Gaesomun became the first Tae Mangniji in the history of Goguryeo. After Yŏn Kaesomun's death, his sons ravaged the kingdom apart with their struggles amongst themselves. With this, Goguryeo eventually fell to the Tang dynasty and the southern Korean kingdom Silla in 668. Yŏn Chayu was later mentioned in on the Steles of his great-grandsons Yŏn Namsaeng and Yŏn Namgŏn.

== Last Name ==
The Steles of Yŏn Namsaeng and Yŏn Namgŏn record Yŏn Chayu's last name as "Ch'ŏn." This has been known to be the work of Tang historians who changed the last name "Yŏn" to "Ch'ŏn" because Tang Gaozu's given name was Yuan, which had the same character as the last name "Yŏn".

== See also ==
- Three Kingdoms of Korea
- Goguryeo
- Yŏn T'aejo
- Yŏn Kaesomun

Preceded by ?	Taedaero of the Western Province of Goguryeo ? – ?	Succeeded by Yŏn T'aejo
Preceded by Ch'ang Chori	Mangniji (Prime Minister) of Goguryeo ? – ?	Succeeded by Yŏn T'aejo
