= Xue Rengui =

Chinese military general

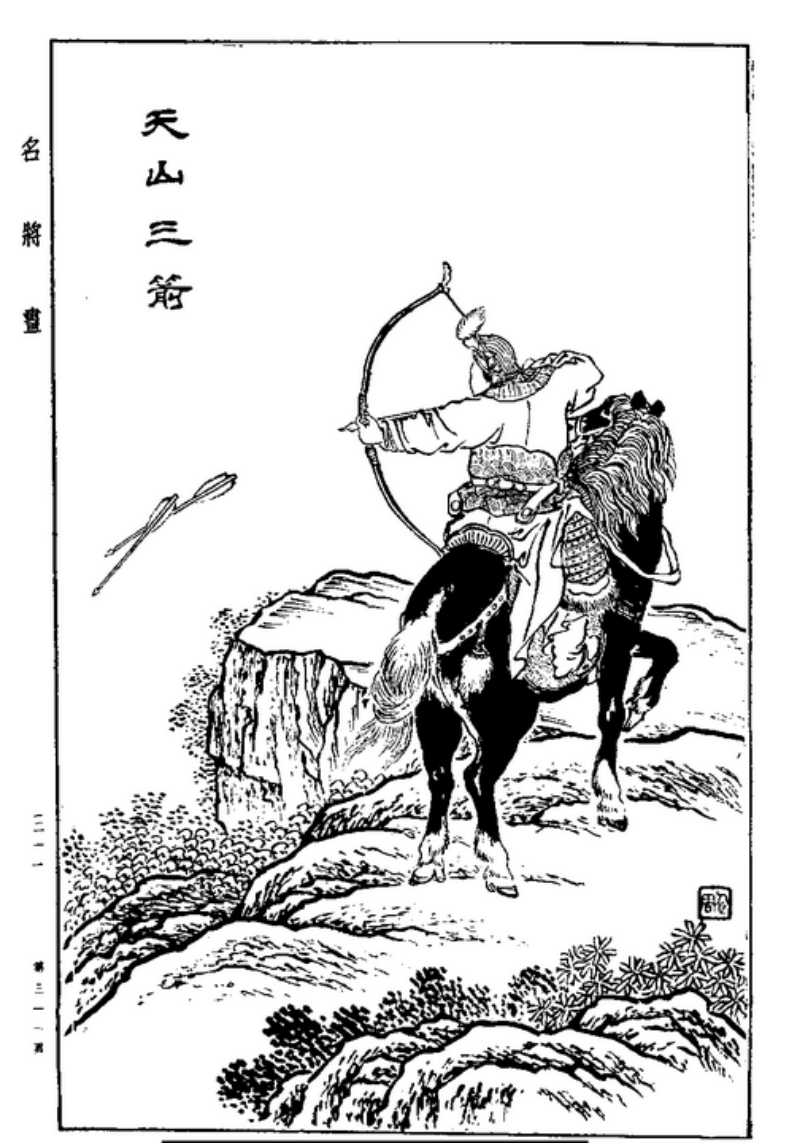
Xue Rengui

Xue Rengui (Suringi) (simplified Chinese: 薛仁贵; traditional Chinese: 薛仁貴; pinyin: Xuē Rénguì; Wade–Giles: Hsüeh^{1} Jen^{2}-kuei^{4}; 614 – 24 March 683), formal name Xue Li (薛禮) but went by the courtesy name of Rengui, was a Chinese military general during the early Tang dynasty. He is one of the most well-known military generals of his time due to his humble background, outstanding command abilities, strength and valour in battle. During his career, he participated in successful campaigns against remnants of Western Tujue and against Goguryeo, with only one major flaw on his record which was a campaign against the Tibetan Empire in 670, where another general in his army refused to listen to Xue's order, caused a portion of the army to be lost.

== During Emperor Taizong's reign ==
Xue Rengui was born in 614, during the reign of Emperor Yang of Sui, but his early activities were not recorded, other than that his wife had the surname Liu (柳). It was said that he was poor and was a farmer. Around the time that Tang dynasty's second emperor Emperor Taizong was set to launch a major campaign against Goguryeo in 644, Xue was planning to rebury his ancestors, when Lady Liu told him:

You have abilities higher than most people, and you need to know when to use them. Now, the Son of Heaven is ready to attack Liaodong and he is seeking fierce warriors. These times do not come often. Is it not the case that you want to have achievements to show yourself? Once you received great honors, it will not be too late to rebury your ancestors.

Xue thus went to meet the general Zhang Shigui (張士貴) to volunteer for the army. Once he reached the front, on an occasion when the general Liu Jun'ang (劉君卬) was being surrounded by Goguryeo forces, Xue went to rescue Liu, and he was able to kill the Goguryeo commander and hang the Goguryeo commander's head on his saddle; after this incident, he began to gain fame and was promoted to become an officer. When Emperor Taizong was ready to attack the Goguryeo city of Ansi (安市, in modern Anshan, Liaoning) in 645 and was faced with a major relief army sent by Goguryeo's Dae Mangniji (regent) Yŏn Kaesomun, commanded by the generals Ko Yŏnsu (高延壽) and Ko Hyejin (高惠真), Emperor Taizong had his officers try to repel the Goguryeo forces. Xue, despite his low military rank, believing himself to be powerful and wanting to show his ferocity, decided to lead the charge. He put on a white armor and armed himself with a Ji and two bows, roaring fiercely and charging into the enemy forces, and no one from the Goguryeo army could stop him, the rest of Tang officers then followed and charged into the enemy line as well. As Xue fought his way through the frontlines against the overwhelming numbers of enemy forces, he inflicted much casualties on the Gogureyo soldiers. Taizong personally led 4,000 elite soldiers into the battle as well, the Goguryeo army's formation was broken, at least 20,000 Goguryeo soldiers were killed and 36,800 soldiers including their generals Ko Yŏnsu and Ko Hyejin, surrendered. In the midst of battle Emperor Taizong spotted Xue from a distance and asked his attendants, "Who is that man in white armor?" and was told it was Xue. Emperor Taizong summoned Xue to his presence and awarded him with gold and silk and also gave him a general title. After Emperor Taizong retreated later in the year, he told Xue:

My generals are all old, and I am trying to find new generals to entrust the military matters to. I cannot find one better than you. I am less happy about gaining Liaodong than about gaining you.

Emperor Taizong made Xue one of the commanding generals for the imperial guards.

== During Emperor Gaozong's reign ==
After Emperor Taizong's death in 649, his son Li Zhi succeeded him (as Emperor Gaozong), and for the first few years of Emperor Gaozong's reign, Xue Rengui appeared to remain a commanding general for the imperial guards. In 654, when Emperor Gaozong was visiting the vacation palace Wannian Palace (萬年宮, in modern Baoji, Shaanxi), there was a major storm. On the night of June 22, it rained particularly hard, and a flash flood descended on the Xuanwu Gate of Wannian Palace. The imperial guards all fled, but Xue did not, and instead climbed up the gate and yelled loudly inside the palace to warn the emperor. Emperor Gaozong quickly got out of his bed and climbed as high as he could, and in brief time, the water flooded into his bedchambers, and this flood killed some 3,000 residents of Linyou County, where the palace was located, and imperial guards. Afterwards, Emperor Gaozong made the comment to Xue, "It is only by your call that I avoided drowning, and from this I know that you are a faithful subject." He awarded Xue a horse.

In 657, when the general Su Dingfang attacked Western Turkic Khaganate's Shaboluo Khan Ashina Helu (阿史那賀魯), Xue submitted a suggestion that if the wife and children of the chief of one of Western Turkic Khaganate's constituent tribes, Nishu Tribe (泥孰), who did not particularly support Ashina Helu but was forced to comply after Ashina Helu took his wife and children hostage, were to be captured by Tang forces, that they be immediately released so that the chief of Nishu would submit to Tang. When Emperor Gaozong approved this suggestion, the chief of Nishu did, indeed, join Tang's army. Su was subsequently able to defeat and capture Ashina Helu.

Later that year, Xue was made deputy to the general Cheng Mingzhen (程名振) in an operation against Goguryeo, and they captured Goguryeo's city Chifeng (赤烽, in modern Fushun, Liaoning) and defeated the Goguryeo general Du Bangnu (豆方婁). In 659, Xue personally led a surprise cavalry charge to attack the Goguryeo formation under the command of Goguryeo general Wen Shamen (溫沙門) and defeated him, single-handedly killing dozens of enemy soldiers in the battle. He also engaged Qidan forces, capturing their chief Abugu (阿卜固) and taking him back to the eastern capital Luoyang. For this achievement, he was created the Baron of Hedong.

In 661, after the chief of Tang's vassal Huige, Yaoluoge Porun (藥羅葛婆閏) died and was succeeded by his nephew Yaoluoge Bisudu (藥羅葛比粟毒), Yaoluoge Bisudu broke away from Tang and allied with two other tribes, Tongluo (同羅) and Pugu (僕固) in attacking Tang's northern boundary. Emperor Gaozong commissioned the general Zheng Rentai (鄭仁泰) to be in charge of an operation against Huige, while making the Xue and Liu Shenli (劉審理) Zheng's deputies. When they encountered Huige's coalition forces—which by this point appeared to include all nine major tribes of Tiele—the coalition challenged Tang forces to a small battle, with Tiele sending out their 10 fiercest warriors. Xue personally engaged them and killed three of them with three arrows, intimidating the Tiele coalition and causing them to submit—but after their surrender, he ordered to kill all the ten and several thousands people. From this incident, a military song was written to praise Xue's ferocity, including the words: "The general is able to pacify Tian Shan with three arrows, and the warriors sing their long songs as they enter the boundaries of Han." After the army returned to Tang territory, however, Xue was charged with killing those who had already surrendered and seizing the spoils of war and arrested for a time, but was eventually released after Emperor Gaozong ruled that the achievements outweighed the crimes.

In 666, Yŏn Kaesomun died, and infighting developed between Yŏn's oldest son Yŏn Namsaeng, who succeeded Yŏn Kaesomun as Dae Mangniji, and two younger sons Yŏn Namgŏn and Yŏn Namsan, over suspicions that they had for each other. Eventually, Yŏn Namgŏn, while Yŏn Namsaeng was away from the capital Pyongyang, claimed the Dae Mangniji title himself. Yŏn Namsaeng sent his son (later known as Ch'ŏn Hŏnsŏng/Quan Xiancheng (泉獻誠), as Yŏn (淵) was the same character as Emperor Gaozong's grandfather Emperor Gaozu's name Yuan and therefore could not be used due to naming taboo) to seek aid from Tang. When Emperor Gaozong sent the generals Pang Tongshan (龐同善) and Gao Kan (高侃) to aid Yŏn Namsaeng, Yŏn Namgŏn tried to intercept them, and Xue, who trailed them, marched forward to aid them, allowing them to defeat Goguryeo forces together. After they captured the cities of Namso (南蘇, in modern Tieling, Liaoning), Mokjeo (木底, in modern Fushun), and Changam (蒼巖, in modern Benxi, Liaoning), they were able to rendezvous with Yŏn Namsaeng. In spring 668, they further marched east and captured Goguryeo's major northeastern city Buyeo (扶餘, in modern Siping, Jilin), and Xue was described to have marched to the sea (probably Sea of Japan) and taking some 40 cities in Goguryeo's northeastern territories, before marching southwest to rendezvous with the supreme commander of the entire operation, Li Ji, at Pyongyang. After Pyongyang fell later in 668, thus ending Goguryeo, Emperor Gaozong ordered that Goguryeo territory be annexed into Tang territory and that a protector general (known as the Protectorate General to Pacify the East) by established at Pyongyang, with Xue appointed as the protector general to defend Pyongyang, along with the general Liu Rengui. Emperor Gaozong created him the Duke of Pingyang. It was said that Xue was a capable administrator and was, for a while, able to receive allegiance from the people of Goguryeo.

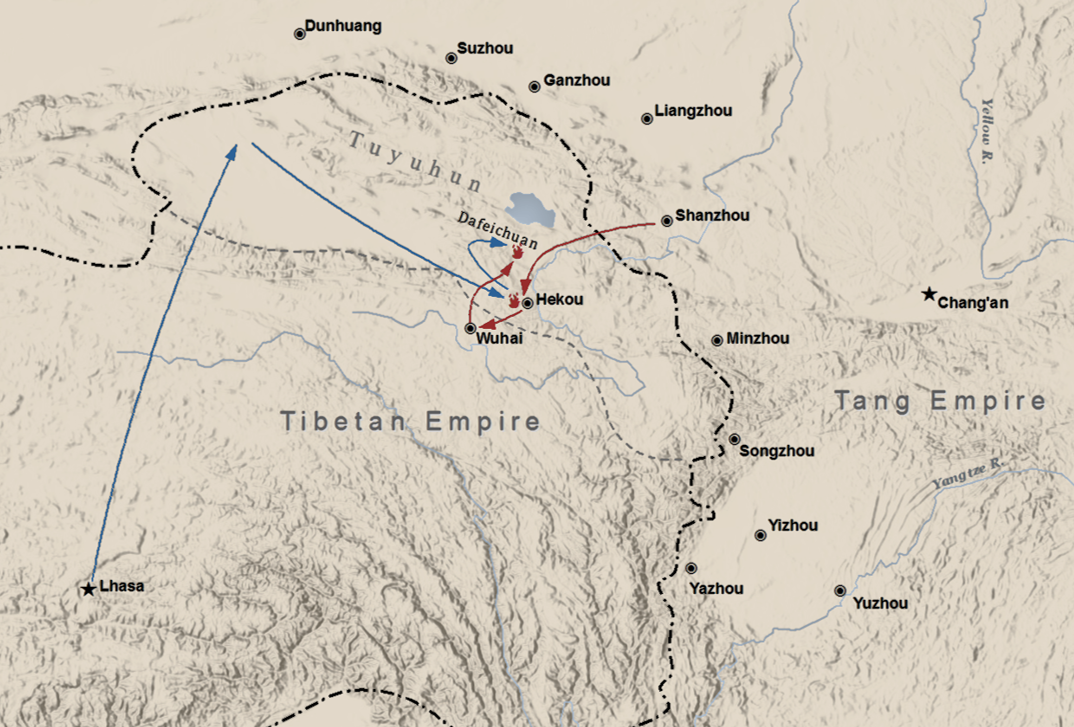
Battle of Dafeichuan in which Xue battled the Tibetans

In 670, Tibetan Empire launched a major attack with 400,000 men on Tang's Anxi Protectorate and captured 18 prefectures. Emperor Gaozong commissioned Xue to command a counterattack, with Ashina Daozhen (阿史那道真), and Guo Daifeng (郭待封), the son of Tang's veteran general Guo Xiaoke (郭孝恪), as his deputies. However, as Guo had been of the same rank as Xue, he viewed serving as Xue's deputy as a dishonor and often disobeyed Xue's orders. Xue's initial strategy was to take some troops ahead toward, with Guo remaining behind at Qinghai Lake with the military supplies—and once Xue had cleared the pass, he would then signal for Guo to proceed. Guo, however, disobeyed the order and did not wait for Xue's signal, but proceeded after Xue departed, and he was intercepted and defeated by a 200,000-men Tibetan army. After Guo's army collapsed, Xue was himself attacked by the Tibetan prime minister Gar Trinring Tsendro ("Lun Qinling" (論欽陵) in Chinese) at the Dafeichuan. Although Xue inflicted heavy loses on the Tibetans, his forces retreated from the Dafei River. Emperor Gaozong sent the official Le Yanwei to the front to put Xue, Guo, and Ashina under arrest, but released them once they were brought back to the capital Chang'an. However, they were relieved of their posts.

At later time, when the people of Goguryeo were rising in resistance to Tang occupation, Xue was put in charge of pacifying the region, but yet later, probably in 675, Xue was deposed for reasons not clearly stated in historical records and exiled to Xiang Prefecture (象州, roughly modern Laibin, Guangxi), only allowed to return from exile when a general pardon was declared. In 681, Emperor Gaozong, remembering Xue's contributions, summoned him and again made him a general. In 682, when remnants of the Eastern Tujue, rising under the chiefs Ashina Gudulu and Ashide Yuanzhen (阿史德元珍), declared independence from Tang, Xue was commissioned to attack Ashide Yuanzhen. His presence intimidated the Eastern Tujue soldiers, who had thought that he was long dead, and he scored a major victory over Ashide Yuanzhen.

Xue died in March 683. His sons Xue Ne and Xue Chuyu (薛楚玉), and several later descendants would serve as generals as well.

== In fiction ==
Xue Rengui's life was dramatized in a number of fictional works. The most prominent of these works were the play Xue Rengui's Glorious Return Home (薛仁貴衣錦歸鄉), by the Yuan dynasty playwright Zhang Guobin (張國賓) and an anonymous novel from Qing dynasty, Xue Rengui's Campaign to the East (薛仁貴征東).

His tenure as General of Andong Protectorate following the fall of Goguryeo has been dramatized in a popular Korean television series called Dae Jo-yeong, and portrays Xue Rengui as a Tang general who is constantly frustrated by the insurgency of the Dongmyeongchun League; remnants of the Goguryeo underground resistance against the Tang.

According to this television action-drama, broadcast worldwide on KBS-1, Xue Rengui could finally claim victory over the Goguryeo insurgency when he had Dae Joyoung and his legion of escaped Baekje, Goguryeo, Khitan, and Silla prisoners cornered, and had Dae Joyoung vow loyalty to the Tang Empire, and become a military officer of high-rank in the Tang army. However, Xue Rengui is to lose Dae Joyoung again following a stratagem in which Dae Joyoung volunteers to lead a punitive force of Tang soldiers against nomadic bandits in Mount Madu to recover stolen Tang money.

While Dae Joyoung successfully recovers the gold and silver taels and convinces the bandits to fight another group of the Tang punitive force led by the evil Tang general Li Wen, he dispatches the stolen property back to Chang'an alongside his close Dongmyeongchun League confidant Mimosa and a small group of Tang soldiers, Dae Joyoung took the opportunity escape the Tang to return to his Goguryeo land on the true-pretext that general Li Wen was going to attack kill him and his Goguryeo subordinates.

This television series also portrays Xue Rengui travelling from Chang'an with only his friend and bodyguard Hongpei to the Khitan-held Yingzhou in order meet his old war protege the Khitan Khan Li Jinzhong to personally warn him about general Li Wen's desire to destroy the Khitans in the year 695. But this is apparently a symbolic gesture made by the show's producers, since General Xue Rengui died in 683, to indicate his good and friendly nature and his disdain for political matters.

A "ballad-narrative" (說晿詞話) known as "The story of Xue Rengui crossing the sea and Pacifying Liao" (薛仁貴跨海征遼故事) was written in the Suzhou dialect of Wu Chinese.

== Popular culture ==
He also appears famously as a hero in Chinese folklore in which he is the father of the fictional general Xue Dingshan and the father-in-law of the Turkic princess Fan Lihua. The story of Xue Dingshan and his wife Fan Lihua is often used as a subject for Chinese opera. There is a drama film named Xue Dingshan San Qi Fan Lihua about them. Because of his campaigns in Korea against both Goguryeo and Silla, he was referred as "The General who Pacified the East" for the Tang. It is ironic, since Xue's fictional son is referred as "The General who Pacified the West" for the Tang because of his fictional campaigns against the Turks, however, the campaigns against the Turks should also be attributed to the latter Xue. In the folklore, Xue Rengui was known to have a massive appetite in which he was thought to be possessed by the "hungry god." The legend of Xue Dingshan and Fan Lihua takes place between the Tang and the fictional Turkic kingdom of Western Liang, ironically there was a real Western Liang during the Sixteen Kingdoms period that was thought to be the ancestors of the Tang.

In Xue Rengui's Expedition to the East, he was bestowed five treasures from Jiutian Xuannu: a whip that could subdue even a white tiger, a cannon that fired a stream of water, the Zhentian bow, an arrow that could penetrate even the clouds, and a wordless holy scripture. Xue Rengui brought these five treasures on his journey to Goryeo. Twelve years later, he finally subdued Dongliao, bringing the region under his control, triumphantly returned, and was awarded the title of the King of Pingliao.

Xue Rengui also sometimes appears as a door god in Chinese and Taoist temples along with the Korean general Yŏn Kaesomun.

In Korean shamanism, Xue Rengui is worshipped as one of the Janggunsin (Korean: 장군신; Hanja: 將軍神; lit. 'General god').

=== Film and television ===
- Portrayed by Alex Man in the 1985 TVB series The Legend of The General Who Never Was
- Portrayed by Lee Deok-hwa in the 2006-2007 KBS TV series Dae Jo-yeong.
- Portrayed by Yoo Tae-woong in 2006-2007 SBS TV series Yeon Gaesomun.
- Portrayed by Bao Jianfeng in the 2006 TV series Legend of Xue Ren Gui
