= Yŏn T'aejo =

Prime Minister Yŏn T'aejo Mangniji
- 연태조

Prime Minister of Goguryeo
- In office ? ~ 616
- Preceded by: Yŏn Chayu
- Succeeded by: Ŭlchi Mundŏk

Military service
- Battles/wars: Goguryeo–Sui War

- Yŏn T'aejo
- Hangul: 연태조
- Hanja: 淵太祚
- RR: Yeon Taejo
- MR: Yŏn T'aejo

Yŏn T'aejo (Korean: 연태조; Hanja: 淵太祚; ? – 616?) was the Mangniji (Prime Minister) of Goguryeo during the reigns of King Pyeongwon and King Yeongyang. He was the father of Yŏn Kaesomun, and was known to have taken an aggressive stance against the Sui dynasty alongside Field Marshal Ŭlchi Mundŏk.

== Background ==
Yŏn T'aejo was the son of the previous Mangniji Yŏn Chayu, and father of Yŏn Kaesomun, Yŏn Chŏngt'o, and their only known sister. During his lifetime, he was the taedaero of the Western province of Goguryeo and was also the Mangniji of Goguryeo after the death of his father.

== Goguryeo-Sui wars ==
After the victories of Goguryeo over the Sui dynasty, infighting occurred within the Goguryeo Court. The North faction, which was highly against the Sui, and the South faction, which favored peace with the Sui, fell into dispute over whether or not Goguryeo should take advantage of the Sui's preoccupation with the rebellion of Yang Xuangan. The North faction consisted of Yŏn T'aejo, Ŭlchi Mundŏk and the military officials, while the South faction consisted of Grand Prince Ko Kŏnmu, and the scholar-officials. The South faction rose victorious, and Yŏn T'aejo attempted to pass his positions on to his eldest son Yŏn Kaesomun, but was stopped by the other taedaeros' protests. This resulted in Yŏn T'aejo's death without seeing a proper successor to his positions.

== Legacy ==
Yŏn T'aejo's position of Mangniji was given to Ŭlchi Mundŏk, and eventually to Yŏn Kaesomun. The position of taedaero of the Eastern province was also given to his eldest son. Yŏn Kaesomun later led a coup that overthrew Ko Kŏnmu, who had become the 27th Taewang of Goguryeo. Yŏn Kaesomun led Goguryeo through one last period of glory before its fall in 668 at the hands of the Tang-Silla Alliance.

== See also ==
- Three Kingdoms of Korea
- Goguryeo
- Goguryeo-Sui Wars
- Yŏn Kaesomun

| Preceded by Yŏn Chayu | Taedaero of the Western Province of Goguryeo ? – 616? | Succeeded by Eventually Yŏn Kaesomun |
| Preceded by Yŏn Chayu | Mangniji (Prime Minister) of Goguryeo ? – 616? | Succeeded by EŬlchi Mundŏk |
