= Bojang =

Bojang is a surname of Gambian origin. Notable people with the surname include:

- Abdoulie Bojang (1960–2024), Gambian politician
- Adama Bojang (born 2004), Gambian footballer
- Amie Bojang-Sissoho, Gambian journalist, women's rights activist and politician
- Hamidou Bojang (born 1997), Gambian footballer
- Jibril Bojang (born 1994), Norwegian-born Gambian footballer
- Momodou Bojang (born 2001), Gambian footballer
- Nyimasata Sanneh-Bojang (1941–2015), Gambian politician
- Sulayman Bojang (born 1997), Norwegian-born Gambian footballer
- Yaya Bojang (born 2004), Gambian footballer

== See also ==
- Bojang of Goguryeo, 7th-century Korean monarch
