= Yŏn Namsan =

Tang dynasty politician from Goguryo (639–701)

- Hangul: 연남산
- Hanja: 淵男産
- RR: Yeon Namsan
- MR: Yŏn Namsan

Yŏn Namsan (淵男産, 연남산; 639–701) was the third son of the Goguryeo military leader and dictator Yŏn Kaesomun (603?–665).

The course of his career shadowed closely that of his elder brother Yŏn Namsaeng. From an early age he was appointed Sŏnin (선인; 先人), and rising through the ranks of sohyŏng (소형; 小兄), taehyŏng (대형; 大兄) widu taehyŏng (위두대형; 位頭大兄) and chunggun chuhwal (중군주활; 中軍主活) (all obscure Goguryeo ranks whose exact nature is unknown.)

Following Yŏn Kaesomun's death around 666 Namsan joined forces with his elder brother Yŏn Namgŏn against their oldest brother Namsaeng, who ultimately fled to Tang China to seek its aid. However, upon the fall of Goguryeo in 668 Namsan submitted to the Tang. In the Tang dynasty, Namsan was accorded the office of Vice Minister of the Court of Imperial Entertainments (Sizai shaoqing 司宰少卿).

Following his death from illness he was buried along with his eldest brother in Luoyang. His tomb stele was later discovered in the Tang eastern capital of Luoyang, along with that of Namsaeng.
