= Yŏn Kaesomun =

Goguryeo military dictator (603–666)

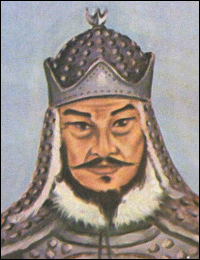
- Conjectural Portrait of Yŏn Kaesomun

Tae Mangniji (Grand Prime Minister) of Goguryeo
- In office 642–666
- Preceded by: None
- Succeeded by: Yŏn Namsaeng

Personal details
- Born: 594
- Died: 666
- Children: Yŏn Namsaeng; Yŏn Namgŏn; Yŏn Namsan
- Parent: Yŏn T'aejo (father)

Korean name
- Hangul: 연개소문
- Hanja: 淵蓋蘇文
- RR: Yeon Gaesomun
- MR: Yŏn Kaesomun

Yŏn Kaesomun (Note: Some Chinese and Korean sources stated that his surname was Yŏn'gae (연개; 淵蓋) and personal name was Somun (소문; 蘇文), but the majority of sources suggest a one-syllable surname and a three-syllable personal name.) (Korean: 연개소문; Hanja: 淵蓋蘇文; 594–666) was a powerful military dictator in the waning days of the Goguryeo kingdom, one of the Three Kingdoms of ancient Korea. Traditional Korean histories from Joseon painted Yŏn Kaesomun as a despotic leader, whose cruel policies and disobedience to his monarch led to the fall of Goguryeo. His successful resistance against Tang China under Emperor Taizong and his son Emperor Gaozong inspired early Korean nationalist historians, most notably the 19th-century Korean historian and intellectual Shin Chae-ho, to term Yŏn Kaesomun the greatest hero in Korean history. In popular culture Yŏn Kaesomun is often portrayed as an exceptional soldier-statesman without equal in Korean history.

== Biography ==
Yŏn Kaesomun was born into the influential and distinguished Yŏn family as the first son of Yŏn T'aejo, "Mangniji" (막리지; 莫離支, a position equivalent to a modern era office of prime minister) of Goguryeo during the reigns of King Pyeongwon and King Yeongyang. His grandfather Yŏn Chayu was also a prime minister.

Information about Yŏn Kaesomun comes largely from the Samguk sagi's biographical accounts of King Yeongnyu, King Bojang, and Yŏn Kaesomun himself, and tomb engravings and biographical accounts, from the New Book of Tang, dedicated to his sons Yŏn Namsaeng and Yŏn Namsan.

Tang Chinese historical records give Yŏn Kaesomun's surname as Ch'ŏn (泉; Quán in Chinese, meaning "water spring"), because Yŏn (淵; Yuān in Chinese, meaning "riverhead") was the given name of Emperor Gaozu (李淵; Lǐ Yuān), the founding emperor of Tang, and thus subject to the naming taboo by Chinese tradition. Yŏn Kaesomun is also sometimes referred to as Kaegŭm (개금; 蓋金). In the Nihon Shoki, he appears as Iri Kasumi (伊梨柯須彌). Since both Yŏn Kaesomun and Iri Kasumi are transcriptions intending to approximate the phonetic value of the original pronunciation, his actual name can be reconstructed as "Eol Kasum".

Very little is known of Yŏn Kaesomun's early days, until he became the Western Governor (西部大人), where he oversaw the building of the Cheolli Jangseong, a network of military garrisons to defend Liaodong from Tang.

Yŏn Kaesomun had at least three sons: (eldest to youngest) Yŏn Namsaeng, Yŏn Namgŏn, and Yŏn Namsan.

=== Overthrow of the throne ===
In the winter of 642, King Yeongnyu was apprehensive about Yŏn Kaesomun and plotted with his other officials to kill him. When Yŏn Kaesomun discovered the plot, he arranged a lavish banquet to celebrate his rise to the position of Eastern Governor (東部大人) to which one hundred of the opposing politicians of the nation were invited. Yŏn Kaesomun ambushed and killed all one hundred politicians present, and then proceeded to the palace and murdered King Yeongnyu. According to traditional Chinese and Korean sources, Yŏn Kaesomun's men dismembered the king's corpse and discarded it without proper ceremony.

After placing King Bojang (r. 642–668),a nephew of King Yeongnyu, on the Goguryeo throne, Yŏn Kaesomun appointed himself the "Tae Mangniji" (대막리지; 大莫離支; generalissimo) and assumed absolute de facto control over Goguryeo affairs of state until his death around 666.

Yŏn Kaesomun's coup d'état came as the culmination of a lengthy power struggle between those in the government who favored appeasement toward Tang China and those who advocated military confrontation; Yŏn Kaesomun belonged to the hard-liners. Traditional Chinese and Korean historians assumed that Yŏn Kaesomun's motive was simply his thirst for power, but many modern Korean historians assert that his motive was to make Goguryeo assume a tougher stance against Tang China, as opposed to King Yeongnyu who submitted to Tang for a peaceful diplomatic relationship. Yŏn Kaesomun's role in the murder of King Yeongnyu was taken as the primary pretext for the failed Tang invasion of 645.

=== Wars with China ===
The series of wars between Goguryeo and Tang China comprise some of the most important events in the ancient history of Northeast Asia, leading to the Tang–Silla alliance, the ultimate demise of powerful Goguryeo, and the unification of the Korean Peninsula under Silla control. Yŏn Kaesomun was a central protagonist in this series of conflicts, as well as its primary cause.

At the outset of his rule, Yŏn Kaesomun took a brief conciliatory stance toward Tang China. For instance, he supported Taoism at the expense of Buddhism, and to this effect in 643, sent emissaries to the Tang court requesting Taoist sages, eight of whom were brought to Goguryeo. This gesture is considered by some historians as an effort to pacify Tang and buy time to prepare for the Tang invasion Yŏn thought inevitable given his ambitions to annex Silla.

Relations with Tang deteriorated when Goguryeo launched new invasions of Silla. In 645, the first conflict of the Goguryeo–Tang War began and Emperor Taizong's noted military acumen enabled him to conquer a number of major Goguryeo border fortresses.

Eventually, however, Emperor Taizong's invasion was met with two major setbacks. First, his main army was stymied and bogged down for several months at Ansi Fortress due to the resistance of the celebrated commander Yang Manch'un. Second, the elite marine force that he sent to take Pyongyang, Goguryeo's capital, was defeated by Yŏn Kaesomun who, according to the Joseon Sanggosa, then immediately marched his legions to relieve Yang Manch'un's forces at Ansi Fortress.

Emperor Taizong, caught between Yang Manch'un's army in the front and Yŏn Kaesomun's counter-attacking forces closing in from behind, as well as suffering from the harsh winter and dangerously low food supplies, was forced to retreat homeward. Before setting off, Emperor Taizong left behind 100 bolts of silk cloth out of respect to Yang Manch'un. The retreat was difficult and many of his soldiers died. Emperor Taizong's campaign against Goguryeo failed. However, he succeeded in inflicting heavy casualties on Goguryeo. Upon returning home, Emperor Taizong founded the Minzhong Temple, the oldest temple in Beijing, to commemorate his soldiers who died in Goguryeo. He invaded Goguryeo again in 647 and 648, but was defeated both times, and thus was unable to accomplish his ambition of conquering Goguryeo in his lifetime.

Conquering Goguryeo had been an obsession with Emperor Taizong, and after his death in 649, his son Emperor Gaozong continued his ambition. After the Tang-Silla alliance conquered Baekje, Emperor Gaozong invaded Goguryeo in 661 and 662. One of Yŏn Kaesomun's greatest victories came in 662, when his forces defeated Tang general Pang Xiaotai (龐孝泰) and his Lingnan army at the Sasu River (蛇水, probably Botong River). Pang Xiaotai and all his 13 sons were killed in combat. Famed Tang general Su Dingfang, who was instrumental in conquering Baekje, was unable to overcome Pyongyang's defenses and was forced to withdraw due to harsh snowstorms. With increasing domestic turmoil in China, Tang was once again forced to retreat.

However, Goguryeo's population and economy were severely damaged due to the long years of continuous warfare. Yŏn Kaesomun died in 666 of a natural cause, and Goguryeo was thrown into chaos and further weakened by a succession struggle among his sons and younger brother, with his eldest son defecting to Tang and his younger brother defecting to Silla. Tang mounted a fresh invasion in 667, aided by Silla and the defector Yŏn Namsaeng, and was finally able to conquer Goguryeo in 668.

=== Death ===
The most likely date of Yŏn Kaesomun's death is that recorded on the tomb stele of his eldest son Yŏn Namsaeng on the twenty-fourth year of the reign of King Bojang (665). However, the Samguk sagi records the year as 666, and the Nihon Shoki gives the year as the twenty-third year of the reign of King Bojang (664).

== Legends ==
According to a local Chinese legend in the 19th-century Funing County Annals (阜宁县志): during a campaign, Emperor Taizong was scouting ahead of his army and was almost captured when he discovered Yŏn Kaesomun's encampment and was recognized by the latter, but narrowly escaped by hiding in a decrepit well; later, Emperor Taizong had a pagoda (朦朧塔) erected near the location.

== Historical depictions ==
Tang and Silla sources portrayed Yŏn Kaesomun as a brutal and arrogant dictator who carried five swords at a time, and had men prostrate themselves so that he could use their backs to mount and dismount his horse.

== In popular culture ==
Yŏn Kaesomun sometimes appears as a door god in Taoist temples in partnership with the Tang general Xue Rengui. In some Chinese legends, Xue Rengui and Yŏn Kaesomun are the reincarnations of the White Tiger's Star and Azure Dragon's Star, respectively.

=== Film and television ===
- Portrayed by Chu Tit-wo in TVB's 1985 series The General That Never Was.
- Portrayed by Jo Kyung-hwan in the 1992–1993 KBS TV series Chronicles of the Three Kingdoms.
- Portrayed by Lee Won-jong in the 2003 Korean film Once Upon a Time in a Battlefield and its 2011 sequel Battlefield Heroes.
- Portrayed by Yoo Dong-geun, Lee Tae-gon and Eun Won-jae in the 2006–2007 SBS TV series Yeon Gaesomun.
- Portrayed by Kim Jin-tae in the 2006–2007 KBS TV series Dae Jo Yeong.
- Portrayed by Ko In-beom in the 2011 MBC TV series Gyebaek.
- Portrayed by Choi Dong-joon in the 2012–2013 KBS TV series The King's Dream.
- Portrayed by Choi Min-soo in the 2013 KBS2 TV series The Blade and Petal.
- Portrayed by Goo Jung Rim in the 2017 KBS1 TV series Chronicles of Korea.
- Portrayed by Yu Oh-seong in the 2018 Korean film The Great Battle.
- Portrayed by Jang Hyuk in the 2026–2027 KBS2 TV series Sword & Silence.

=== Literature ===
Yŏn Kaesomun (under the name Gai Suwen) appears in Peking opera as the archvillain of the famed Tang general Xue Rengui, who rescues Emperor Taizong from Yŏn Kaesomun's pursuit.

Yŏn Kaesomun appears in numerous classical Chinese literature about Xue Rengui, who rescues Emperor Taizong from certain death at the hands of Yŏn Kaesomun himself.

Age of Empires: World Domination, a mobile game produced in collaboration with series owner Microsoft, includes Yŏn Kaesomun as a selectable hero of the Korean civilization.

== Notes ==
Preceded by Yŏn T'aejo	Taedaero of the Western Province of Goguryeo; 642–665	Succeeded by Yŏn Namsaeng
Preceded by Ŭlchi Mundŏk	Mangniji (Prime Minister) of Goguryeo; 642 – ?	Succeeded by Yŏn Namsaeng
Preceded by None	Tae Mangniji (Grand Prime Minister) of Goguryeo; 642–665	Succeeded by Yŏn Namsaeng
