= Yŏn Namsaeng =

Goguryeo politician (634–679)

- Hangul: 연남생
- Hanja: 淵男生
- RR: Yeon Namsaeng
- MR: Yŏn Namsaeng

Yŏn Namsaeng (Korean: 연남생; Hanja: 淵男生; 634–679) was the eldest son of the Goguryeo Dae Mangniji (대막리지, 大莫離支; highest-ranking official or dictator; "prime minister") Yŏn Kaesomun (603? – 665). In 665, Yŏn Namsaeng succeeded his father and became the 2nd Tae Mangniji of Goguryeo.

== Tae Mangniji ==
Yŏn Namsaeng was said to have become Tae Mangniji sometime before the death of Yŏn Kaesomun, who is said to have stepped down from the position and took the honorary position of Tae Mangniji.

After the death of his father, Yŏn Namsaeng prepared for war with the Tang, and set out on an inspection of the border fortresses in Yodong, and other fortresses throughout the kingdom. He left his brothers, Yŏn Namgŏn and Yŏn Namsan, in charge of Pyongyang before he left. Namgŏn and Namsan took advantage of their brother's absence and took control of Pyongyang and the Royal Courts. They falsely accused Namsaeng of being a traitor, and forced the King Bojang to order Namsaeng's arrest. With nowhere else to go, Namsaeng fled to Tang China at the urge of his son, who had escaped death at the hands of his uncles. Namsaeng fled to the Tang, and received a high position in the Tang military.

== Fall of Goguryeo and death ==
From there he helped lead a Tang-sponsored military campaign into Goguryeo with hopes of regaining power. This campaign ultimately destroyed Goguryeo in 668. He died in the domains of the Tang-established Protectorate General to Pacify the East, or Andong Duhufu (安東都護府), the Chinese administration established in Pyongyang following the fall of Goguryeo in 668 and meant to administer the former Goguryeo domains. Namsaeng was buried on Mt. Mang in Luoyang, Tang's eastern capital.

Namsaeng's tomb stele, along with that of his brother Namgŏn, has been discovered. Namsaeng's biography (Quan Nansheng 泉男生傳) appears in the Xin Tangshu (New History of Tang), book 110. The Chinese rendering of Namsaeng's family name is Cheon (泉, Chinese Quan) rather than Yŏn (淵), because Yŏn (Chinese, Yuan) was the given name of Emperor Gaozu of Tang (Li Yuan 李淵), founder and first emperor of Tang, and taboo to apply to another by Chinese tradition.

== In popular culture ==
- Portrayed by Im Ho in the 2006–2007 KBS TV series Dae Jo-yeong.
- Portrayed by Ahn Jae-mo in 2006–2007 SBS TV series Yŏn Kaesomun.
- Portrayed by No Min-woo in the 2013 KBS2 TV series The Blade and Petal.

== See also ==
- Yŏn Kaesomun
- Goguryeo
- Andong Dohufu

== Sources ==
- Samguk Sagi
- Old Book of Tang

Preceded by Yŏn Kaesomun	Taedaero of the Western Province of Goguryeo; 642 – ?	Succeeded by Yŏn Namgŏn
Preceded by Yŏn Kaesomun	Magniji (Prime Minister) of Goguryeo; 665–665	Succeeded by None
Preceded by Yŏn Kaesomun	Tae Mangniji (Grand Prime Minister) of Goguryeo; 665–665	Succeeded by Yŏn Namgŏn
