= Yŏn Namgŏn =

Second son of Yŏn Kaesomun

- Hangul: 연남건
- Hanja: 淵男建
- RR: Yeon Namgeon
- MR: Yŏn Namgŏn

Yŏn Namgŏn (淵男建, 연남건) (635 ~ ?) was the second son of the Goguryeo military leader and dictator Yŏn Kaesomun (Unknown-666), and third Tae Mangniji of Goguryeo during the reign of Goguryeo's last ruler, King Bojang.

== Fall of Goguryeo ==
Following the death of his father in 666, Namgŏn became embroiled in a power struggle with his elder brother Yŏn Namsaeng. Namgŏn and his younger brother Namsan staged a coup against their older brother when he was inspecting all of the fortresses of Goguryeo to prepare for war against the Tang. Namgŏn and Namsan's coup forced Namsaeng to surrender to the Tang, and ultimately led to the destruction of Goguryeo. Namgŏn appointed himself Tae Mangniji (대막리지, 大莫離支) and seized control of the government.

During Tang's subsequent invasion of 668, Namgŏn led armed resistance to the Chinese forces near the Amnok River and continued to resist the Tang forces all the way to Pyongyang. With Goguryeo's defeat, Namgŏn found himself a prisoner of war and was transported to China and later banished to Qianzhou (黔州), in what is today China's Sichuan province, where he apparently died. The tomb steles of Namgŏn's siblings Namsaeng and Namsan are extant but offer no particulars regarding the life of Namgŏn. Had Namgŏn and his brothers united to work together, Goguryeo would have lasted for a much longer period of time, but Silla sent their spies into the brothers' inner circle of advisors to try and create a rift between the brothers.

== Popular culture ==
- Portrayed by Ahn Hong-jin in the 2006-2007 KBS TV series Dae Jo-Yŏng.
- Portrayed by Kim Hong-pyo in 2006-2007 SBS TV series Yŏn Kaesomun.

== See also ==
- Goguryeo
- Bojang of Goguryeo
- Yŏn Kaesomun

== Notes ==
Preceded by Yŏn Namsaeng	Taedaero of the Eastern Province of Goguryeo; 666 - 668	Succeeded by None
Preceded by Yŏn Namsaeng	Mangniji (Prime Minister) of Goguryeo; 666 - 668	Succeeded by None
Preceded by Yŏn Namsaeng	Tae Mangniji (Grand Prime Minister) of Goguryeo; 666 - 668	Succeeded by None
