= Goguryeo =

Korean kingdom (37 BC–668 AD)

Coordinates: 41°02′24″N 126°40′12″E

Goguryeo: 高句麗 (Hanja); 고구려 (Hangul); Goryeo: 高麗; 고려
- c. 37 BCE – 668 CE
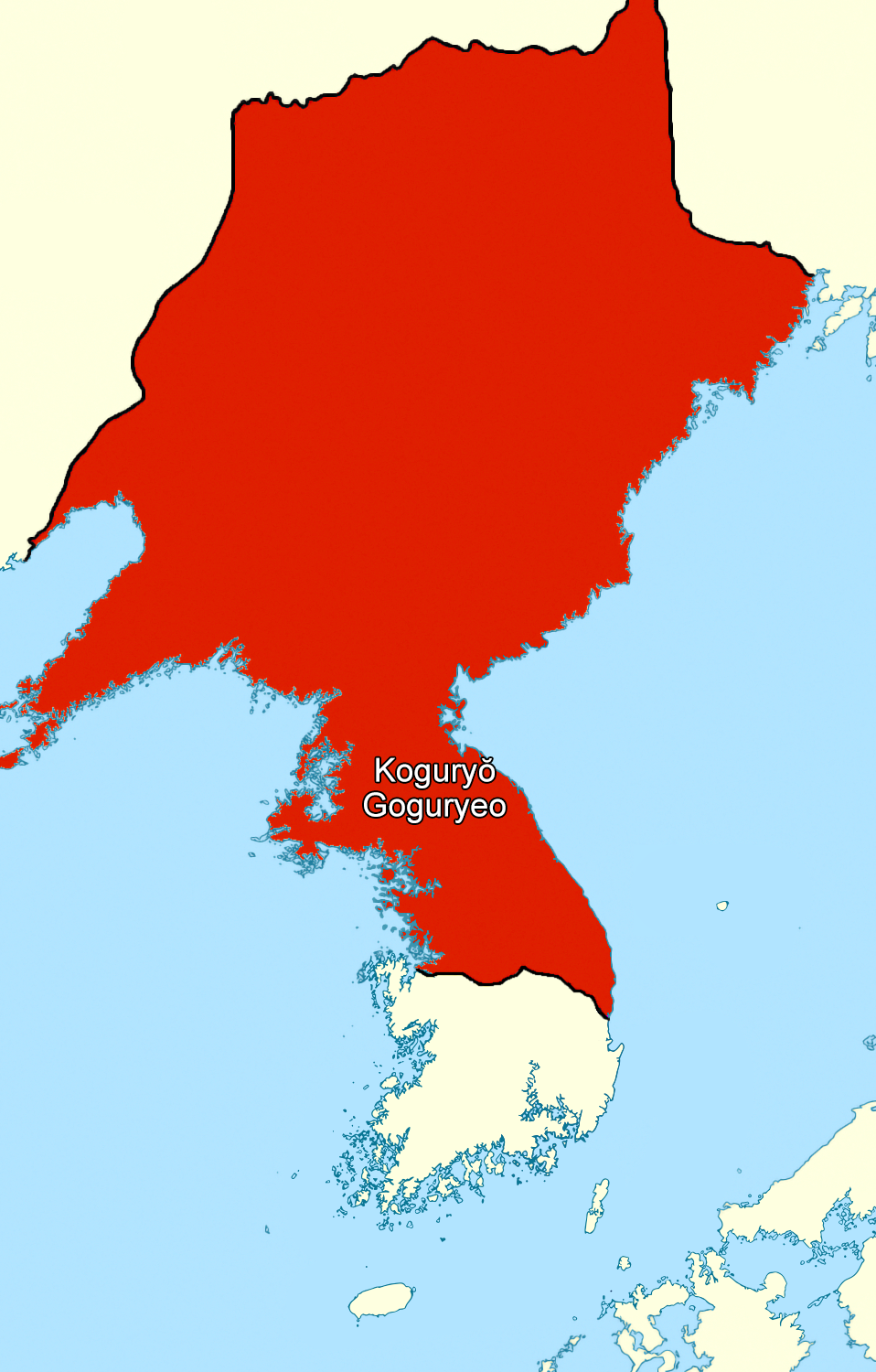
- Goguryeo (Goryeo) in the 5th century
- Status: Kingdom
- Capital: Jolbon; (37 BCE – 3 CE); Gungnae; (3–427); Pyongyang; (427–668)
- Common languages: Goguryeo (Koreanic); Literary Chinese
- Ethnic groups: Yemaek
- Religion: Korean Buddhism (official); Confucianism; Taoism; Musok
- Government: Monarchy
- Taewang (King)
  - 37–19 BCE: Dongmyeong (first)
  - 391–413: Gwanggaeto
  - 413–491: Jangsu
  - 590–618: Yeongyang
  - 642–668: Bojang (last)
- Grand Prime Minister
  - 642–665: Yŏn Kaesomun (first)
  - 666–668: Yŏn Namgŏn (last)
- Legislature: Jega Council
- Historical era: Ancient
  - Establishment: 37 BCE
  - Adoption of Buddhism: 372
  - Campaigns of Gwanggaeto the Great: 391–413
  - Goguryeo–Sui War: 598–614
  - Goguryeo–Tang War: 645–668
  - Fall of Pyongyang: 668 CE

Population
  - 7th century: approx. 3,500,000 (697,000 households)
Preceded by
Buyeo
Succeeded by
Unified Silla
Balhae
Protectorate General to Pacify the East

Korean name
- Hangul: 고구려
- Hanja: 高句麗
- RR: Goguryeo
- MR: Koguryŏ
- IPA: [ko.ɡu.ɾjʌ]

Goryeo
- Hangul: 고려
- Hanja: 高麗
- RR: Goryeo
- MR: Koryŏ
- IPA: [ko.ɾjʌ]

Old Korean
- Hangul: 구려
- Hanja: 句麗
- RR: Guryeo
- MR: Kuryŏ
- IPA: [ku.ɾjʌ]

Goguryeo (37 BC (Note: North Korea claims that the country was established in 277 BC.) – 668 AD) (Korean: 고구려; Hanja: 高句麗; RR: Goguryeo; lit. 'high castle'; Korean pronunciation: [ko̞.ɡu.ɾjʌ̹]; Old Korean: Guryeo), also later known as Goryeo (Korean: 고려; Hanja: 高麗; RR: Goryeo; lit. 'high and beautiful'; Korean pronunciation: [ko.ɾjʌ]; Middle Korean: 고ᇢ롕〮, kwòwlyéy), was a Korean kingdom which was located on the northern and central parts of the Korean Peninsula and the southern and central parts of modern-day Northeast China (Manchuria). At its peak of power, Goguryeo encompassed most of the Korean Peninsula and large parts of Manchuria, along with parts of modern-day Russia. Archaeological evidence suggests it may have extended as far west as modern-day eastern Mongolia.

Along with Paekche and Silla, Goguryeo was one of the Three Kingdoms of Korea. It was an active participant in the power struggle for control of the Korean Peninsula and was also associated with the foreign affairs of neighboring polities in China and Japan.

Goguryeo was one of the great powers in East Asia until its defeat by a Silla–Tang alliance in 668 after prolonged exhaustion and internal strife following the death of Yŏn Kaesomun. After its fall, its territory was divided between the Tang dynasty, Later Silla and Parhae.

The name "Goryeo" (alternatively spelled "Koryŏ"), a shortened form of Goguryeo (Koguryŏ), was adopted as the official name in the 5th century, and is the origin of the English name "Korea".

== Names and etymology ==
The kingdom was originally called Guryeo (Old Korean: 句麗, Yale: Kwulye, [ku.ɾjʌ̹]) or something similar to kaukuri), Both words were derived from "忽" (*kuru or *kolo) which meant castle or fortress. The word was possibly a Wanderwort like the Middle Mongolian qoto-n.

Several possible cognates for 忽 exist as well, which was used at a later stage as an administrative subdivision with the spelling of hwol [hʌ̹ɭ], as in 買忽 mwoyhwol / michwuhwol [mit͡ɕʰuhʌ̹ɭ], alongside the likely cognate of 骨 kwol [ko̞ɭ]. Nam Pung-hyun presents it also as a Paekche term, probably a cognate with the Goguryeo word with the same meaning and spelling.

The iteration of 徐羅伐 Syerapel as 徐羅城 *SyeraKUY equated the Old Korean word for village, 伐 pel with the Old Japanese one for castle 城 ki, considered a borrowing from Paekche 己 *kuy, in turn a borrowing from Goguryeo 忽 *kolo. Middle Korean 골〯 kwǒl [ko̞ɭ] and ᄀᆞ옳 kòwòlh [kʌ̀.òl] ("district") are likely descended from *kolo.

The name Goguryeo (Korean: 고구려; Hanja: 高句麗; Korean pronunciation: [ko̞ɡuɾjʌ̹]), which means "high castle", is a combination of Guryeo and the prefix Go (Korean: 고; Hanja: 高; lit. 'high, big'). The name came from Goguryeo-hyeon, a subdivision that was established by the Xuantu Commandery. As Han influence over Korea declined, Goguryeo-hyeon became the center of the early Goguryeo union.

From the mid-5th century, Goguryeo was shortened to the calque of Goryeo (Korean: 고려; Hanja: 高麗; Korean pronunciation: [ko.ɾjʌ]; Middle Korean: 고ᇢ롕〮, Kwòwlyéy), which by itself had the meaning of "high and beautiful".

== History ==
=== Origins ===
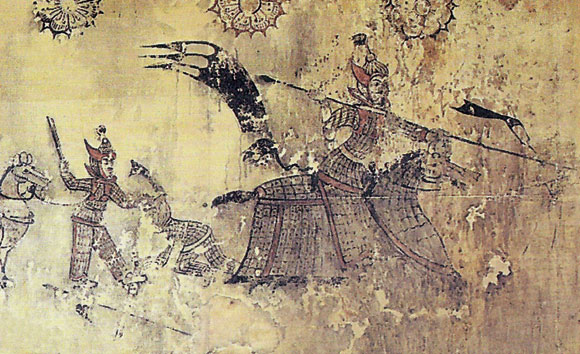
Goguryeo Cataphract(개마무사/鎧馬武士)

The earliest record of the name of Goguryeo can be traced to geographic monographs in the Book of Han and is first attested as the name of one of the subdivisions of the Xuantu Commandery, established along the trade routes within the Amnok river basin following the destruction of Gojoseon in 113 BC. The American historian Christopher Beckwith offers the alternative proposal that the Guguryeo people were first located in or around Liaoxi (western Liaoning and parts of Inner Mongolia) and later migrated eastward, pointing to another account in the Book of Han. The early Goguryeo tribes from whom the administrative name is derived were located close to or within the area of control of the Xuantu Commandery. Its tribal leaders also appeared to have held the ruler title of "marquis" over said nominal Gaogouli/Goguryeo county. The collapse of the first Xuantu Commandery in 75 BC is generally attributed to the military actions of the Goguryeo natives. In the Old Book of Tang (945), it is recorded that Emperor Taizong refers to Goguryeo's history as being some 900 years old. According to the 12th-century Samguk sagi and the 13th-century Samguk yusa, a prince from the Buyeo kingdom named Jumong fled after a power struggle with other princes of the court and founded Goguryeo in 37 BC in a region called Jolbon Buyeo, usually thought to be located in the middle Amnok/Yalu and Hun River basin.

The Samguk sagi, a text from the 12th century in Goryeo, claims that Goguryeo was founded in 37 BC, but today the date of the dynasty's foundation is in doubt, as archaeological evidence suggests that Goguryeo was founded before Silla, and four things support this:

1. Kim Pusik was a 12th-century historian and author of the Samguk sagi (History of the Three Kingdoms). Since he was a descendant of the Silla royal family, it is likely that he distorted history to show the superiority of his ancestor, Silla, and this is undeniable.
2. Since Kim Pusik wrote the History of the Three Kingdoms at least 5 centuries after the events of the Three Kingdoms and was not an eyewitness to the events of that era, his book is considered a secondary source and cannot be considered a primary source alone.
3. The age of Goguryeo in the Samguk sagi contradicts what is inscribed in Gwanggaeto the Great's stele (which is a primary source). Gwanggaeto the Great's stele states that Goguryeo is 900 years old, but the Samguk sagi mentions Goguryeo as a dynasty that lasted 705 years.
4. Also, the Old Book of Tang (945), a primary source, written by Li Shimin (Taizong), mentions that Goguryeo is about 900 years old.

In 75 BC, a group of Yemaek who may have originated from Goguryeo made an incursion into China's Xuantu Commandery west of the Yalu. The first mention of Goguryeo as a group label associated with Yemaek tribes is a reference in the Han Shu that discusses a Goguryeo revolt in 12 AD, during which they broke away from the influence of the Xuantu Commandery.

According to Book 37 of the Samguk sagi, Goguryeo originated north of ancient China, then gradually moved east to the side of Taedong River. At its founding, the Goguryeo people are believed to be a blend of people from Buyeo and Yemaek, as leadership from Buyeo may have fled their kingdom and integrated with existing Yemaek chiefdoms. The Records of the Three Kingdoms, in the section titled "Accounts of the Eastern Barbarians", implied that Buyeo and the Yemaek people were ethnically related and spoke a similar language.

According to John Jorgensen, "Goguryeo was a multi-ethnic kingdom, ruled by mounted warrior tribes originating from the north in Buyeo, consisting of local Yemaek farmers and other groups, who were likely the ancestors of modern Koreans. There were as well migrants and captives of Chinese and Xianbei ethnic groups, brought in to bolster the rulers' powers in the captured territories." Book 28 of Samguk sagi stated that "many people of China fled [to] East of the Sea due to the chaos of war by Qin and Han". Later Han dynasty established the Four Commanderies, and in 12 AD Goguryeo made its first attack on the Xuantu Commandery. The population of Xuantu Commandery was about 221,845 in 2 AD, and they lived in the commandery's three counties of Gaogouli, Shangyintai, and Xigaima. Later on, Goguryeo gradually annexed all the Four Commanderies of Han during its expansion.

Both Goguryeo and Paekche shared founding myths and originated from Buyeo.

=== Jumong and the foundation myth ===
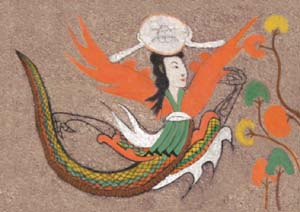
Image of Dalshin from the Goguryeo-era Ohoe Tomb 4.

The earliest mention of Jumong is in the 4th-century Gwanggaeto Stele. Jumong is the modern Korean transcription of the hanja 朱蒙 Jumong, 鄒牟 Chumo, or 仲牟 Jungmo.

The Stele states that Jumong was the first king and ancestor of Goguryeo and that he was the son of the prince of Buyeo and daughter of Habaek (Korean: 하백; Hanja: 河伯), the god of the Amnok River or, according to an alternative interpretation, the sun god Haebak (Korean: 해밝). The Samguk sagi and Samguk yusa paint additional detail and names Jumong's mother as Yuhwa (Korean: 유화; Hanja: 柳花). Jumong's biological father was said to be a man named Haemosu who is described as a "strong man" and "a heavenly prince". The river god chased Yuhwa away to the Ubal River (Korean: 우발수; Hanja: 優渤水) due to her pregnancy, where she met and became the concubine of Geumwa.

Jumong was well known for his exceptional archery skills. Eventually, Geumwa's sons became jealous of him, and Jumong was forced to leave Eastern Buyeo. The Stele and later Korean sources disagree as to which Buyeo Jumong came from. The Stele says he came from Buyeo and the Samguk yusa and Samguk sagi say he came from Eastern Buyeo. Jumong eventually made it to Jolbon, where he married Soseono, daughter of its ruler. He subsequently became king himself, founding Goguryeo with a small group of his followers from his native country.

A traditional account from the "Annals of Paekche" section in the Samguk sagi says that Soseono was the daughter of Yeon Tabal, a wealthy influential figure in Jolbon and married to Jumong. However, the same source officially states that the king of Jolbon gave his daughter to Jumong, who had escaped with his followers from Eastern Buyeo, in marriage. She gave her husband, Jumong, financial support in founding the new statelet, Goguryeo. After Yuri, son of Jumong and his first wife, Lady Ye, came from Dongbuyeo and succeeded Jumong, she left Goguryeo, taking her two sons Biryu and Onjo south to found their own kingdoms, one of which was Paekche.

Jumong's given surname was "Hae" (Korean: 해; Hanja: 解), the name of the Buyeo rulers. According to the Samguk yusa, Jumong changed his surname to "Go" (Korean: 고; Hanja: 高) in conscious reflection of his divine parentage. Jumong is recorded to have conquered the tribal states of Biryu (Korean: 비류국; Hanja: 沸流國) in 36 BC, Haeng-in (Korean: 행인국; Hanja: 荇人國) in 33 BC, and Northern Okjeo in 28 BC.

=== Centralization and early expansion (mid-first century) ===
Goguryeo developed from a league of various Yemaek tribes to an early state and rapidly expanded its power from their original basin of control in the Hun River drainage. In the time of Taejodae in 53 AD, five local tribes were reorganized into five centrally ruled districts. Foreign relations and the military were controlled by the king. Early expansion might be best explained by ecology; Goguryeo controlled territory in what is currently central and southern Manchuria and northern Korea, which are both very mountainous and lacking in arable land. Upon centralizing, Goguryeo might have been unable to harness enough resources from the region to feed its population and thus, following historical pastoralist tendencies, would have sought to raid and exploit neighboring societies for their land and resources. Aggressive military activities may have also aided expansion, allowing Goguryeo to exact tribute from their tribal neighbors and dominate them politically and economically.

Taejo conquered the Okjeo tribes of what is now northeastern Korea as well as the Dongye and other tribes in Southeastern Manchuria and Northern Korea. From the increase of resources and manpower that these subjugated tribes gave him, Taejodae led Goguryeo in attacking the Han Commanderies of Lelang and Xuantu on the Korean and Liaodong peninsulas, becoming fully independent from them.

Generally, Taejodae allowed the conquered tribes to retain their chieftains, but required them to report to governors who were related to Goguryeo's royal line; tribes under Goguryeo's jurisdiction were expected to provide heavy tribute. Taejodae and his successors channeled these increased resources to continuing Goguryeo's expansion to the north and west. New laws regulated peasants and the aristocracy, as tribal leaders continued to be absorbed into the central aristocracy. Royal succession changed from fraternal to patrilineal, stabilizing the royal court.

The expanding Goguryeo kingdom soon entered into direct military contact with the Liaodong Commandery to its west. Around this time, Chinese warlord Gongsun Kang established the Daifang Commandery by separating the southern half from the Lelang commandery. Balgi, a brother of King Sansang of Goguryeo, defected to Kang and asked for Kang's aid to help him take the throne of Goguryeo. Although Goguryeo defeated the first invasion and killed Balgi, in 209, Kang invaded Goguryeo again, seized some of its territory and weakened Goguryeo. Pressure from Liaodong forced Goguryeo to move their capital in the Hun River valley to the Yalu River valley near Hwando.

=== Goguryeo–Wei Wars ===
In the chaos following the fall of the Han dynasty, the former Han commanderies had broken free of control and were ruled by various independent warlords. Surrounded by these commanderies, who were governed by aggressive warlords, Goguryeo moved to improve relations with the newly created dynasty of Cao Wei in China and sent tribute in 220. In 238, Goguryeo entered into a formal alliance with Wei to destroy the Liaodong commandery.

When Liaodong was finally conquered by Wei, cooperation between Wei and Goguryeo fell apart and Goguryeo attacked the western edges of Liaodong, which incited a Wei counterattack in 244. Thus, Goguryeo initiated the Goguryeo–Wei War in 242, trying to cut off Chinese access to its territories in Korea by attempting to take a Chinese fort. However, the Wei state responded by invading and defeated Goguryeo. The capital at Hwando was destroyed by Wei forces in 244. It is said that Dongcheon, with his army destroyed, fled for a while to the Okjeo state in the east. Wei invaded again in 259 but was defeated at Yangmaenggok; according to the Samguk sagi, Jungcheon assembled 5,000 elite cavalry and defeated the invading Wei troops, beheading 8,000 enemies.

=== Revival and further expansion (300 to 390) ===
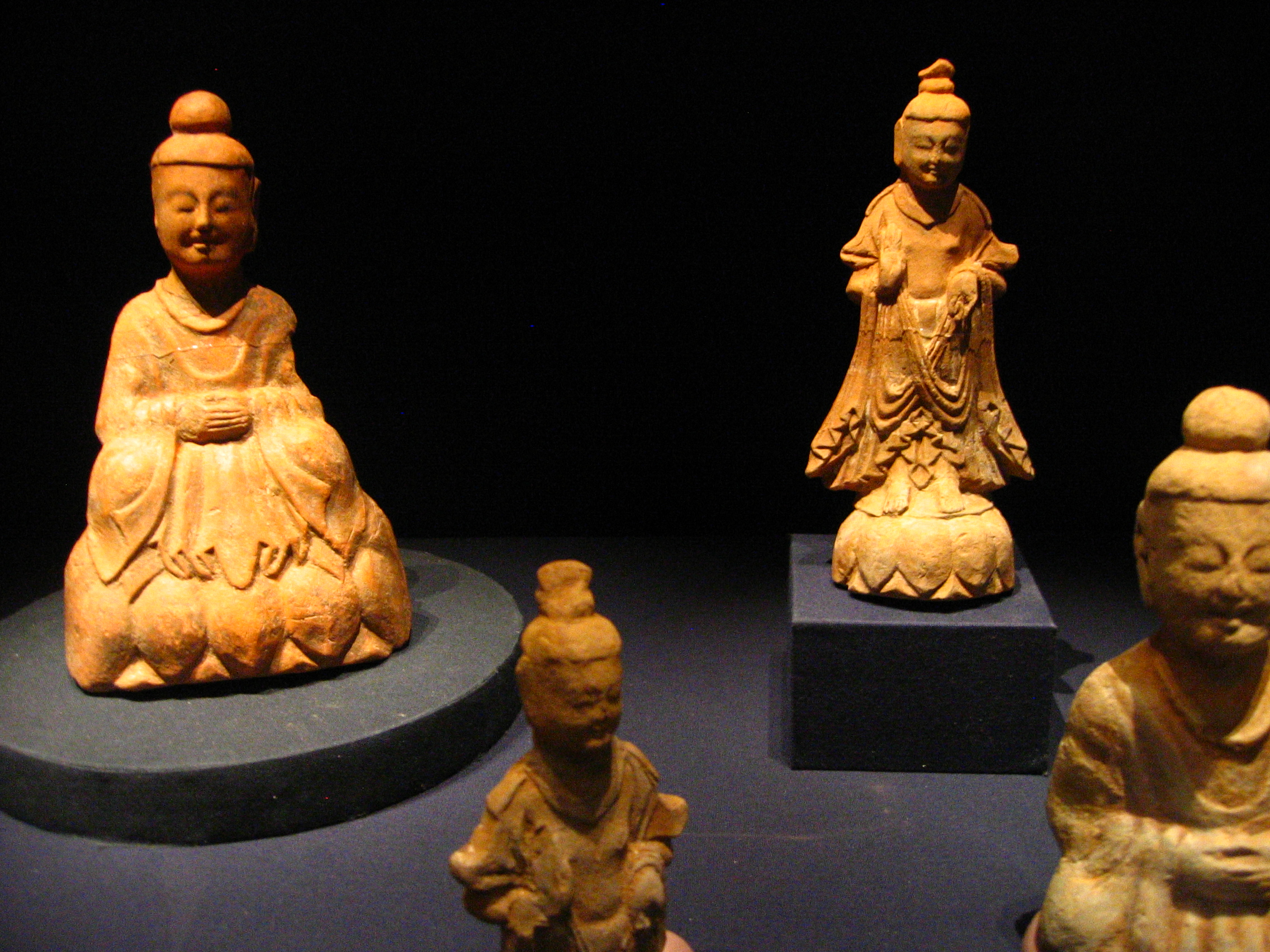
Seated buddhas and bodhisattvas from Wono-ri, Goguryeo.

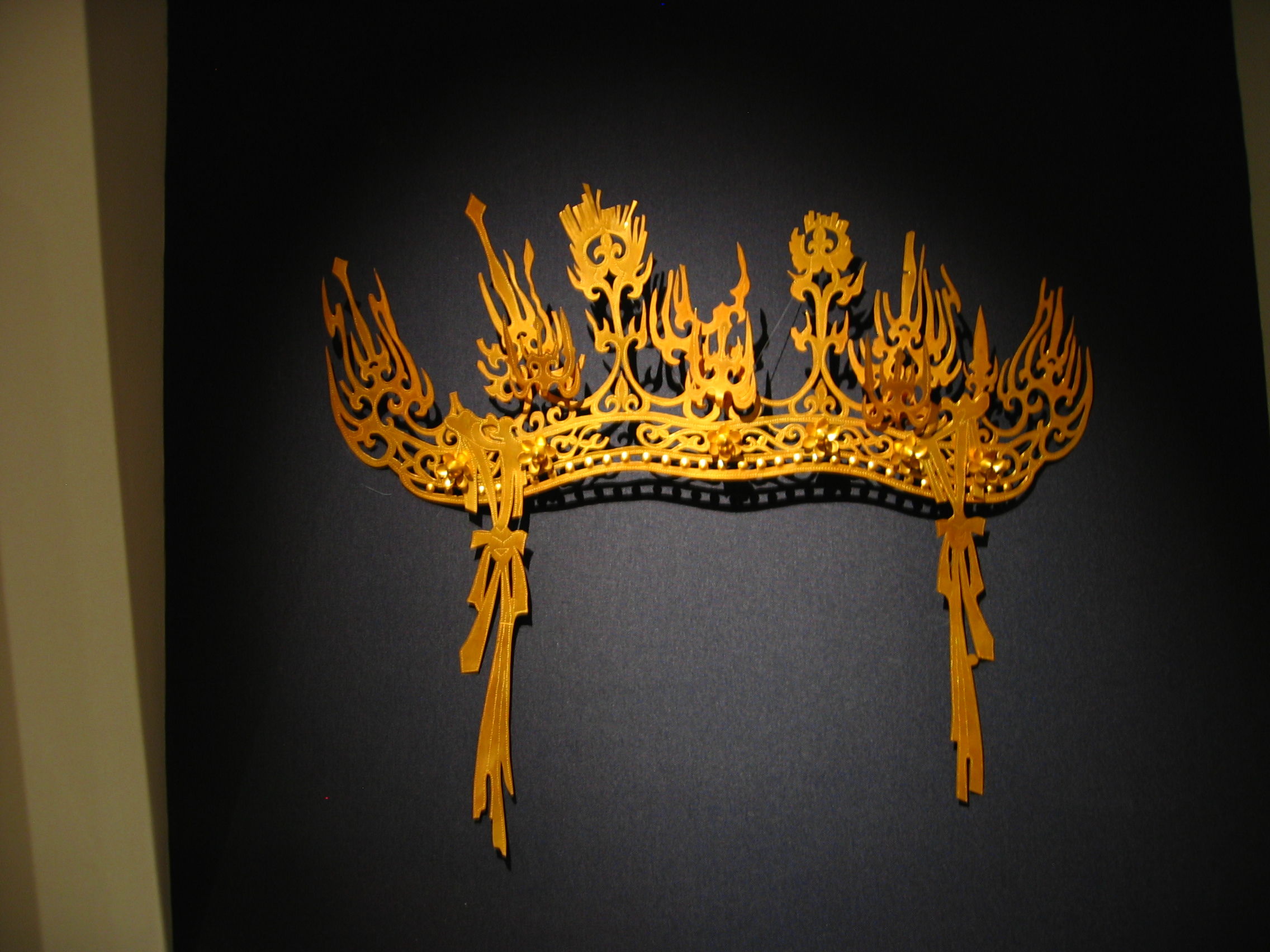
A gilt-bronze crown from Goguryeo believed to have once adorned the head of a bodhisattva image.

In only 70 years, Goguryeo rebuilt its capital Hwando and again began to raid the Liaodong, Lelang and Xuantu commanderies. As Goguryeo extended its reach into the Liaodong peninsula, the last Chinese commandery at Lelang was conquered and absorbed by Micheon in 313, bringing the remaining northern part of the Korean Peninsula into the fold. This conquest resulted in the end of Chinese rule over territory in the northern Korean Peninsula, which had spanned 400 years. From that point on, until the 7th century, territorial control of the peninsula would be contested primarily by the Three Kingdoms of Korea.

Goguryeo met major setbacks and defeats during the reign of Gogukwon in the 4th century. In the early 4th century, the nomadic proto-Mongol Xianbei people occupied northern China; during the winter of 342, the Xianbei of Former Yan, ruled by the Murong clan, attacked and destroyed Goguryeo's capital, Hwando, capturing 50,000 Goguryeo men and women to use as slave labor in addition to taking the Queen Dowager and Queen prisoner, and forced Gogukwon to flee for a while. The Xianbei also devastated Buyeo in 346, accelerating Buyeo migration to the Korean peninsula. In 371, Geunchogo of Baekje killed Gogukwon in the Battle of Chiyang and sacked Pyongyang, one of Goguryeo's largest cities.

Sosurim, who succeeded the slain Gogukwon, reshaped the nation's institutions to save it from a great crisis. Turning to domestic stability and the unification of various conquered tribes, Sosurim proclaimed new laws, embraced Buddhism as the state religion in 372, and established a national educational institute called the Taehak (Korean: 태학; Hanja: 太學). Due to the defeats that Goguryeo had suffered at the hands of the Xianbei and Paekche, Sosurim instituted military reforms aimed at preventing such defeats in the future. Sosurim's internal arrangements laid the groundwork for Gwanggaeto's expansion. His successor and the father of Gwanggaeto the Great, Gogukyang, invaded Later Yan, the successor state of Former Yan, in 385 and Paekche in 386.

Goguryeo used its military to protect and exploit semi-nomadic peoples, who served as vassals, foot soldiers, or slaves, such as the Okjeo people in the northeast end of the Korean peninsula, and the Mohe people in Manchuria, who would later become the Jurchens.

=== Zenith of Goguryeo's Power (391 to 531 AD) ===
Detail of a rubbing of the Gwanggaeto Stele (414 AD), one of the few surviving records made by Goguryeo, written in Classical Chinese.

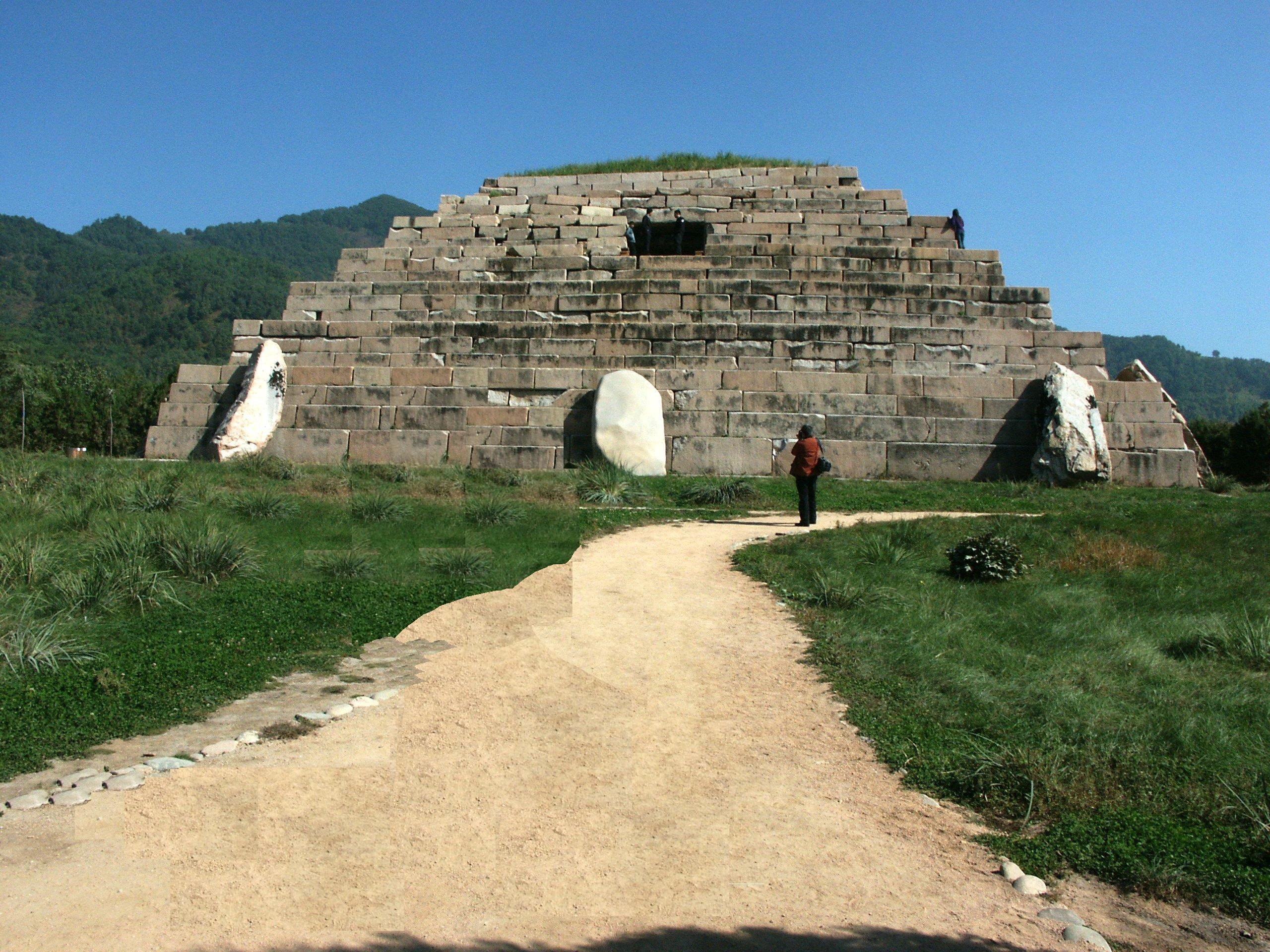
A royal tomb, located in Ji'an, Jilin, China, was built by the Goguryeo Kingdom.

Goguryeo experienced a golden age under Gwanggaeto the Great and his son Jangsu. During this period, Goguryeo territories included three fourths of the Korean Peninsula, including what is now Seoul, almost all of Manchuria, and parts of Inner Mongolia. There is archaeological evidence that Goguryeo's maximum extent lay even further west in now Mongolia, based on discoveries of Goguryeo fortress ruins in Mongolia.

Gwanggaeto the Great (r. 391–412) was a highly energetic emperor who is remembered for his rapid military expansion of the realm. He instituted the era name of Yeongnak or Eternal Rejoicing, affirming that Goguryeo was on equal standing with the dynasties in China. Gwanggaeto conquered 64 walled cities and 1,400 villages during his campaigns. To the west, he destroyed neighboring Khitan tribes and invaded Later Yan, conquering the entire Liaodong peninsula; to the north and east, he annexed much of Buyeo and conquered the Sushen, who were Tungusic ancestors of the Jurchens and Manchus; and to the south, he defeated and subjugated Paekche, contributed to the dissolution of Kaya, and vassalized Silla after defending it from a coalition of Paekche, Kaya, and Wa. Gwanggaeto brought about a loose unification of the Korean peninsula, and achieved undisputed control of most of Manchuria and over two thirds of the Korean peninsula.

Gwanggaeto's exploits were recorded on a huge memorial stele erected by his son Jangsu, located in present-day Ji'an on the border between China and North Korea.

Jangsu (r. 413–491) ascended to the throne in 413 and moved the capital in 427 to Pyongyang, a more suitable region to grow into a burgeoning metropolitan capital, which led Goguryeo to achieve a high level of cultural and economic prosperity. Jangsu, like his father, continued Goguryeo's territorial expansion into Manchuria and reached the Songhua River to the north. He invaded the Khitans, and then attacked the Didouyu, located in eastern Mongolia, with his Rouran allies. Like his father, Jangsu also achieved a loose unification of the Three Kingdoms of Korea. He defeated Paekche and Silla and gained large amounts of territory from both. In addition, Jangsu's long reign saw the perfecting of Goguryeo's political, economic and other institutional arrangements. Jangsu ruled Goguryeo for 79 years until the age of 98, the longest reign in East Asian history.

During the reign of Munja, Goguryeo completely annexed Buyeo, signifying Goguryeo's furthest-ever expansion north, while continuing its strong influence over the kingdoms of Silla and Paekche, and the tribes of Wuji and Khitan.

=== Internal strife (531 to 551) ===
Goguryeo reached its zenith in the 6th century. After this, however, it began a steady decline. Anjang was assassinated, and succeeded by his brother Anwon, during whose reign aristocratic factionalism increased. A political schism deepened as two factions advocated different princes for succession, until the eight-year-old Yang-won was finally crowned. But the power struggle was never resolved definitively, as renegade magistrates with private armies appointed themselves de facto rulers of their areas of control.

Taking advantage of Goguryeo's internal struggle, a nomadic group called the Tuchueh attacked Goguryeo's northern castles in the 550s and conquered some of Goguryeo's northern lands. Weakening Goguryeo even more, as civil war continued among feudal lords over royal succession, Paekche and Silla allied to attack Goguryeo from the south in 551.

=== Conflicts of the late 6th and 7th centuries ===
In the late 6th and early 7th centuries, Goguryeo was often in military conflict with the Sui and Tang dynasties of China. Its relations with Paekche and Silla were complex and alternated between alliances and enmity. A neighbor in the northwest were the Eastern Türks which was a nominal ally of Goguryeo.

==== Goguryeo's loss of the Han River Valley ====
In 551 AD, Paekche and Silla entered into an alliance to attack Goguryeo and conquer the Han River valley, an important strategic area close to the center of the peninsula and a very rich agricultural region. After Paekche exhausted themselves with a series of costly assaults on Goguryeo fortifications, Silla troops, arriving on the pretense of offering assistance, attacked and took possession of the entire Han River valley in 553. Incensed by this betrayal, Seong launched a retaliatory strike against Silla's western border in the following year but was captured and killed.

The war, along the middle of the Korean Peninsula, had very important consequences. It effectively made Paekche the weakest player on the Korean Peninsula and gave Silla an important resource and population rich area as a base for expansion. Conversely, it denied Goguryeo the use of the area, which weakened the kingdom. It also gave Silla direct access to the Yellow Sea, opening up direct trade and diplomatic access to the Chinese dynasties and accelerating Silla's adoption of Chinese culture. Thus, Silla could rely less on Goguryeo for elements of civilization and could get culture and technology directly from China. This increasing tilt of Silla to China would result in an alliance that would prove disastrous for Goguryeo in the late 7th century.

==== Goguryeo–Sui War ====
The Sui dynasty's reunification of China for the first time in centuries was met with alarm in Goguryeo, and Pyeongwon of Goguryeo began preparations for a future war by augmenting military provisions and training more troops. Although Sui was far larger and stronger than Goguryeo, the Paekche-Silla Alliance that had driven Goguryeo from the Han Valley had fallen apart, and thus Goguryeo's southern border was secure. Initially, Goguryeo tried to appease Sui by offering tribute as Korean kingdoms had done under the Tributary system of China. However, Goguryeo continued insistence on an equal relationship with Sui, its reinstatement of the imperial title "Taewang" (Emperor in Korean) of the East and its continued raids into Sui territory greatly angered the Sui Court. Furthermore, Silla and Paekche, both under threat from Goguryeo, requested Sui assistance against Goguryeo as all three Korean kingdoms had desired to seize the others' territories to rule the peninsula, and attempted to curry Sui's favor to achieve these goals.

Goguryeo's expansion and its attempts to equalize the relationship conflicted with Sui China and increased tensions. In 598, Goguryeo made a preemptive attack on Liaoxi which led to the Battle of Linyuguan, but was beaten back by Sui forces. This caused Emperor Wen to launch a counterattack by land and sea that ended in disaster for Sui.

Sui's most disastrous campaign against Goguryeo was in 612, in which Sui, according to the History of the Sui dynasty, mobilized 30 division armies, about 1,133,800 combat troops. Pinned along Goguryeo's line of fortifications on the Liao River, a detachment of nine division armies, about 305,000 troops, bypassed the main defensive lines and headed towards the Goguryeo capital of Pyongyang to link up with Sui naval forces, who had reinforcements and supplies.

However, Goguryeo was able to defeat the Sui navy, thus when the Sui's nine division armies finally reached Pyongyang, they did not have the supplies for a lengthy siege. Sui troops retreated, but General Ŭlchi Mundŏk led the Goguryeo troops to victory by luring the Sui into an ambush outside of Pyongyang. At the Battle of Salsu, Goguryeo soldiers released water from a dam, which split the Sui army and cut off their escape route. Of the original 305,000 soldiers of Sui's nine division armies, it is said that only 2,700 escaped to Sui China.

The 613 and 614 campaigns were aborted after launch—the 613 campaign was terminated when the Sui general Yang Xuangan rebelled against Emperor Yang, while the 614 campaign was terminated after Goguryeo offered a truce and returned Husi Zheng (斛斯政), a defecting Sui general who had fled to Goguryeo, Emperor Yang later had Husi executed. Emperor Yang planned another attack on Goguryeo in 615, but due to Sui's deteriorating internal state he was never able to launch it. Sui was weakened due to rebellions against Emperor Yang's rule and his failed attempts to conquer Goguryeo. They could not attack further because the provinces in the Sui heartland would not send logistical support.

Emperor Yang's disastrous defeats in Korea greatly contributed to the collapse of the Sui dynasty.

==== Goguryeo–Silla War, Goguryeo-Tang War and the Silla–Tang alliance ====
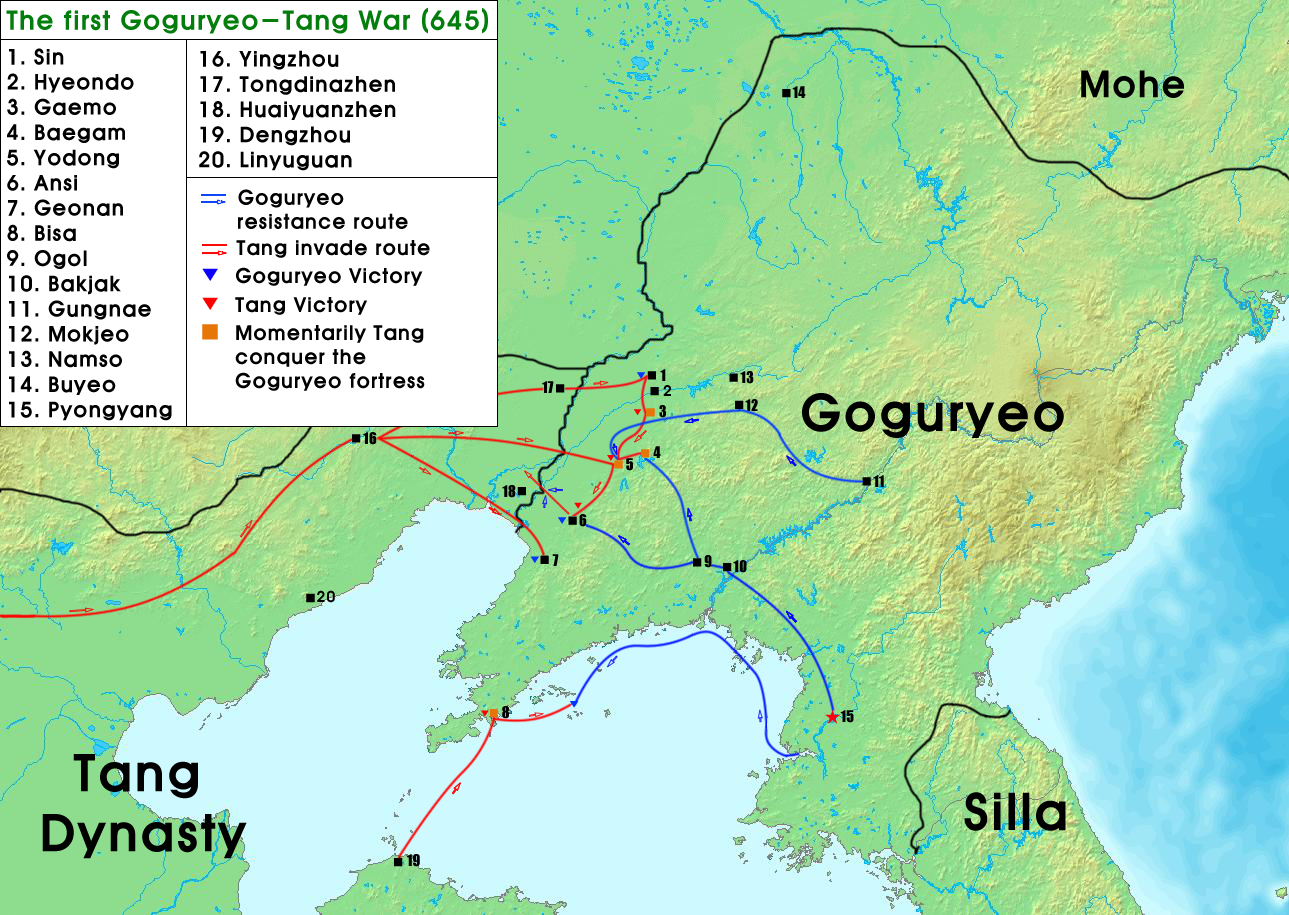
First campaign in the Goguryeo–Tang War.

In the winter of 642, King Yeongnyu was apprehensive about Yŏn Kaesomun, one of the great nobles of Goguryeo, and plotted with other officials to kill him. However, Yŏn Kaesomun caught news of the plot and killed Yeongnyu and 100 officials, initiating a coup d'état. He proceeded to enthrone Yeongnyu's nephew, Go Jang, as King Bojang while wielding de facto control of Goguryeo himself as the Dae Magniji (대막리지; 大莫離支; a position equivalent to a modern era dual office of prime minister and generalissimo). At the outset of his rule, Yŏn Kaesomun took a brief conciliatory stance toward Tang China. For instance, he supported Taoism at the expense of Buddhism, and to this effect in 643, sent emissaries to the Tang court requesting Taoist sages, eight of whom were brought to Goguryeo. This gesture is considered by some historians as an effort to pacify Tang and buy time to prepare for the Tang invasion Yŏn thought inevitable given his ambitions to annex Silla.

However, Yŏn Kaesomun took an increasingly provocative stance against Silla Korea and Tang China. Soon, Goguryeo formed an alliance with Paekche and invaded Silla, Daeya-song (modern Hapchon) and around 40 border fortresses were conquered by the Goguryeo-Paekche alliance. Since the early 7th century, Silla had been forced on the defensive by both Paekche and Goguryeo, which had not yet formally allied but had both desired to erode Sillan power in the Han Valley. During the reign of King Jinpyeong of Silla, numerous fortresses were lost to both Goguryeo and the continuous attacks took a toll on Silla and its people. During Jinpyeong's reign, Silla made repeated requests beseeching Sui China to attack Goguryeo. Although these invasions were ultimately unsuccessful, in 643, once again under pressure from the Goguryeo–Paekche alliance, Jinpyeong's successor, Queen Seondeok of Silla, requested military aid from Tang. Although Taizong had initially dismissed Silla's offers to pay tribute and its requests for an alliance on account of Seondeok being a woman, he later accepted the offer due to Goguryeo's growing belligerence and hostile policy towards both Silla and Tang. In 644, Tang began preparations for a major campaign against Goguryeo.

In 645, Emperor Taizong, who had a personal ambition to defeat Goguryeo and was determined to succeed where Emperor Yang had failed, personally led an attack on Goguryeo. The Tang army captured a number of Goguryeo fortresses, including the important Yodong/Liaodong Fortress (遼東城, in modern Liaoyang, Liaoning). During his first campaign against Goguryeo, Taizong famously showed generously to the defeated inhabitants of numerous Goguryeo fortresses, refusing to permit his troops to loot downs and enslave inhabitants and when faced with protest from his commanders and soldiers, rewarded them with his own money. Ansi City (in modern Haicheng, Liaoning), which was the last fortress that would clear the Liaodong peninsula of significant defensive works and was promptly put under siege. Initially, Taizong and his forces achieve great progress, when his numerically inferior force smashed a Goguryeo relief force at the Battle of Mount Jupil. Goguryeo's defeat at Mount Jupil had significant consequences, as Tang forces killed over 20,000 Goguryeo soldiers and captured another 36,800, which crippled Goguryeo's manpower reserves for the rest of the conflict. However, the capable defense put up by Ansi's commanding general (whose name is controversial but traditionally is believed to be Yang Manch'un) stymied Tang forces and, in late fall, with winter fast approaching and his supplies running low, Tang forces under the command Prince Li Daozong attempted to build a rampart to seize the city in a last ditch effort, but was foiled when Goguryeo troops managed to seize control of it. Afterwards, Taizong decided to withdraw in the face of incoming Goguryeo reinforcements, deteriorating weather conditions and the difficult supply situation. The campaign was unsuccessful for the Tang Chinese, failing to capture Ansi Fortress after a protracted siege that lasted more than 60 days. Emperor Taizong invaded Goguryeo again in 647 and 648, but was defeated both times.

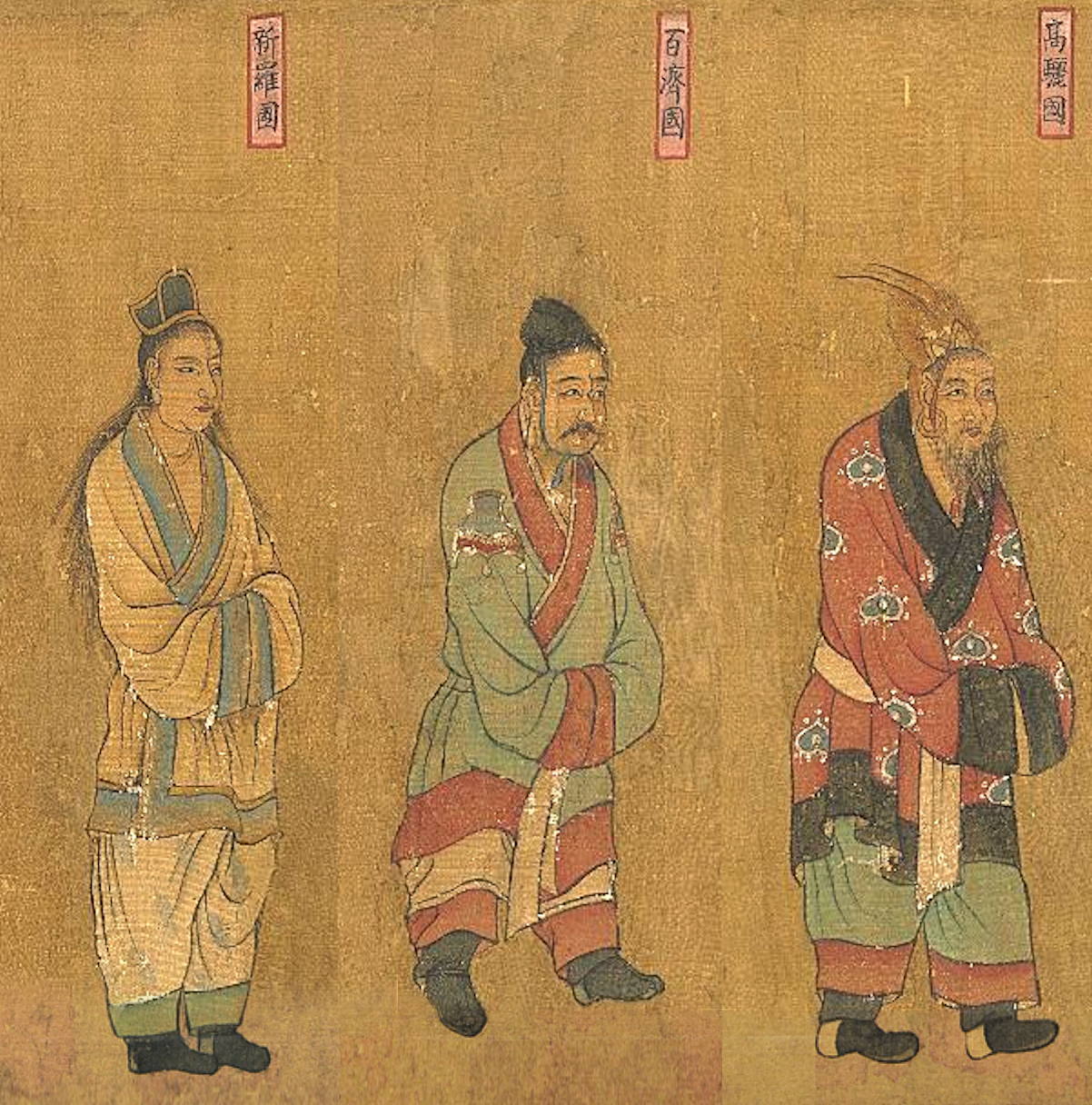
Painting of envoys from the Three Kingdoms of Korea to the Tang court: Silla, Paekche, and Goguryeo. Portraits of Periodical Offering, circa 650 AD, Tang dynasty

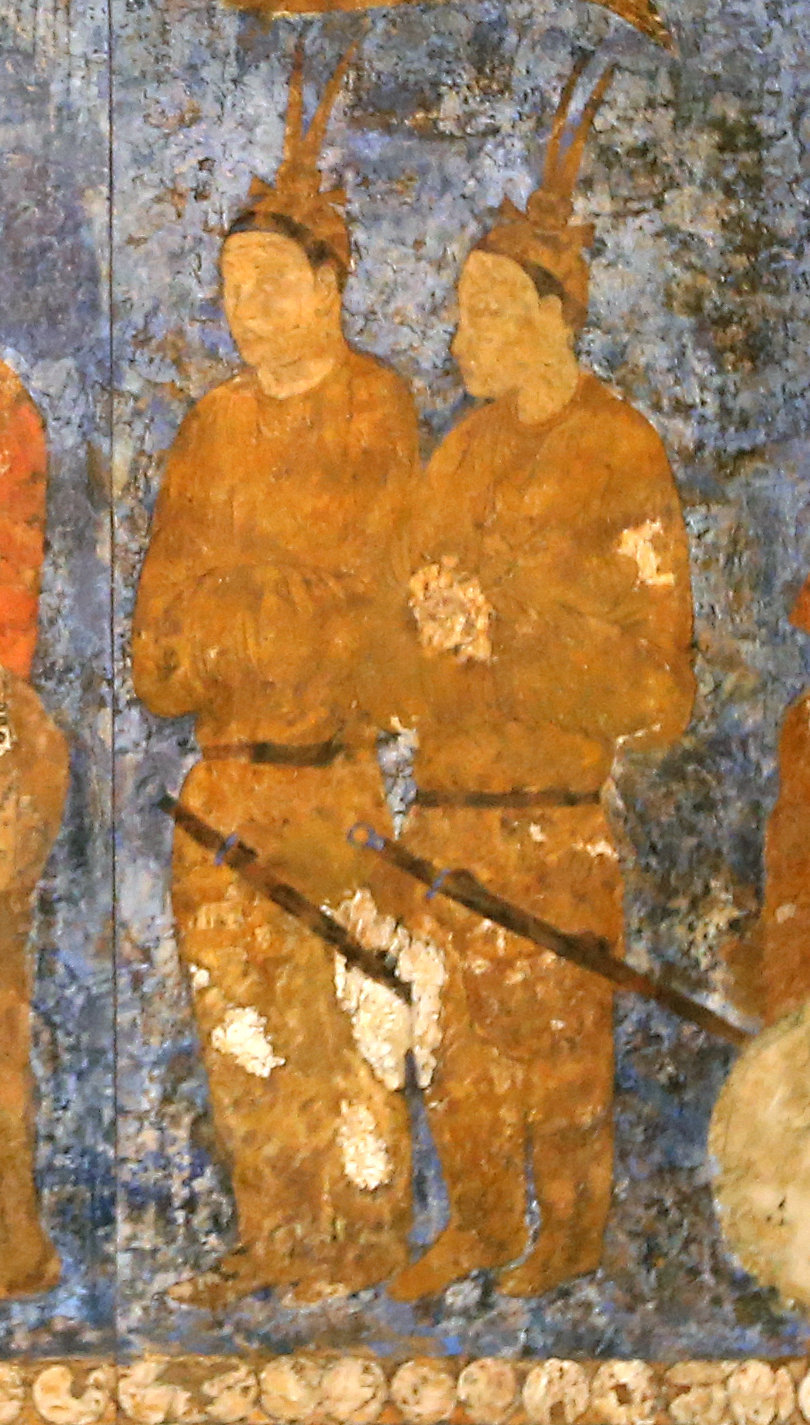
Goguryeo ambassadors during an audience with King Varkhuman of Samarkand. They are identified by the two feathers on top of their head. 648–651 AD, Afrasiab murals, Samarkand.

Emperor Taizong prepared another invasion in 649, but died in the summer, possibly due to an illness he contracted during his Korean campaigns. His son Emperor Gaozong continued his campaigns. Upon the suggestion of Kim Chunchu, the Silla–Tang alliance first conquered Paekche in 660 to break up the Goguryeo–Paekche alliance, and then turned its full attention to Goguryeo. However, Emperor Gaozong, too, was unable to defeat Goguryeo led by Yŏn Kaesomun; one of Yŏn Kaesomun's most notable victories came in 662 at the Battle of Sasu (蛇水), where he annihilated the Tang forces and killed the invading ex-rebel Nanman general Pang Xiaotai (龐孝泰) and all 13 of his sons. Therefore, while Yŏn Kaesomun was alive, Tang could not defeat Goguryeo.

==== Fall ====
In the summer of 666, Yŏn Kaesomun died of a natural cause and Goguryeo was thrown into chaos and weakened by a succession struggle among his sons and younger brother. He was initially succeeded as Dae Mangniji, the highest position newly made under the ruling period of Yŏn Kaesomun, by his oldest son Yŏn Namsaeng. As Yŏn Namsaeng subsequently carried out a tour of Goguryeo territory, however, rumors began to spread both that Yŏn Namsaeng was going to kill his younger brothers Yŏn Namgŏn and Yŏn Namsan, whom he had left in charge at Pyongyang, and that Yŏn Namgŏn and Yŏn Namsan were planning to rebel against Yŏn Namsaeng. When Yŏn Namsaeng subsequently sent officials close to him back to Pyongyang to try to spy on the situation, Yŏn Namgŏn arrested them and declared himself Dae Mangniji, attacking his brother. Yŏn Namsaeng sent his son Ch'ŏn Hŏnsŏng (泉獻誠), as Yŏn Namsaeng changed his family name from Yŏn (淵) to Cheon (泉) observe naming taboo for Emperor Gaozu, to Tang to seek aid. Emperor Gaozong saw this as an opportunity and sent an army to attack and destroy Goguryeo. In the middle of Goguryeo's power struggles between Yŏn Kaesomun's successors, his younger brother, Yŏn Chŏngt'o, defected to the Silla side.

In 667, the Chinese army crossed the Liao River and captured Shin/Xin Fortress (新城, in modern Fushun, Liaoning). The Tang forces thereafter fought off counterattacks by Yŏn Namgŏn, and joined forces with and received every possible assistance from the defector Yŏn Namsaeng, although they were initially unable to cross the Yalu River due to resistance. In spring of 668, Li Ji turned his attention to Goguryeo's northern cities, capturing the important city of Buyeo (扶餘, in modern Nong'an, Jilin). In fall of 668, he crossed the Yalu River and put Pyongyang under siege in concert with the Silla army.

Yŏn Namsan and Bojang surrendered, and while Yŏn Namgŏn continued to resist in the inner city, his general, the Buddhist monk Shin Seong (信誠) turned against him and surrendered the inner city to Tang forces. Yŏn Namgŏn tried to commit suicide, but was seized and treated. This was the end of Goguryeo, and Tang annexed Goguryeo into its territory, with Xue Rengui being put initially in charge of former Goguryeo territory as protector general. The violent dissension resulting from Yŏn Kaesomun's death proved to be the primary reason for the Tang–Silla triumph, thanks to the division, defections, and widespread demoralization it caused. The alliance with Silla had also proved to be invaluable, thanks to the ability to attack Goguryeo from opposite directions, and both military and logistical aid from Silla. The Tang established the Andong Protectorate on former Goguryeo lands after the latter's fall.

However, there was much resistance to Tang rule (fanned by Silla, which was displeased that Tang did not give it Goguryeo or Paekche's territory), and in 669, following Emperor Gaozong's order, a part of the Goguryeo people were forced to move to the region between the Yangtze River and the Huai River, as well as the regions south of the Qinling Mountains and west of Chang'an, only leaving old and weak inhabitants in the original land. Over 200,000 prisoners from Goguryeo were taken by the Tang forces and sent to Chang'an. Some people entered the service of the Tang government, such as Go Sagye and his son Gao Xianzhi (Go Seonji in Korean), the famed general who commanded the Tang forces at the Battle of Talas.

Silla thus unified most of the Korean peninsula in 668, but the kingdom's reliance on China's Tang dynasty had its price. Tang set up the Protectorate General to Pacify the East, governed by Xue Rengui, but faced increasing problems ruling the former inhabitants of Goguryeo, as well as Silla's resistance to Tang's remaining presence on the Korean peninsula. Silla had to forcibly resist the imposition of Chinese rule over the entire peninsula, which lead to the Silla–Tang Wars, but their own strength did not extend beyond the Taedong River. Although the Tang forces were expelled from territories south of Taedong River, Silla failed to regain the former Goguryeo territories north of the Taedong River, which were now under Tang dominion.

==== Restoration movements ====
After the fall of Goguryeo in 668, many Goguryeo people rebelled against the Tang and Silla by starting Goguryeo restoration movements. Among these were Geom Mojam, Dae Jung-sang, and several famous generals. The Tang dynasty tried but failed to establish several commanderies to rule over the area.

In 677, Tang crowned Bojang as the "King of Joseon" and put him in charge of the Liaodong commandery of the Protectorate General to Pacify the East. However, Bojang continued to foment rebellions against Tang in an attempt to revive Goguryeo, organizing Goguryeo refugees and allying with the Mohe tribes. He was eventually exiled to Sichuan in 681, and died the following year.

The Protectorate General to Pacify the East was installed by the Tang government to rule and keep control over the former territories of the fallen Goguryeo. It was first put under the control of Tang General Xue Rengui, but was later replaced by Bojang due to the negative responses of the Goguryeo people. Bojang was sent into exile for assisting Goguryeo restoration movements, but was succeeded by his descendants. Bojang's descendants declared independence from Tang during the same period as the An Lushan Rebellion and Li Zhengji (Yi Jeong-gi in Korean)'s rebellion in Shandong. The Protectorate General to Pacify the East was renamed "Little Goguryeo" until its eventual absorption into Parhae under the reign of Seon.

Geom Mojam and Anseung rose briefly at the Han Fortress (한성, 漢城, in modern Chaeryong, South Hwanghae), but failed, when Anseung surrendered to Silla. Go Anseung ordered the assassination of Geom Mojam, and defected to Silla, where he was given a small amount of land to rule over. There, Anseung established the State of Bodeok (보덕; 報德), incited a rebellion, which was promptly crushed by Sinmun. Anseung was then forced to reside in the Silla capital, given a Silla bride and had to adopt the Silla royal surname of "Kim."

Dae Jung-sang and his son Dae Jo-yeong, either a former Goguryeo general or a Mohe chief, regained most of Goguryeo's northern land after its downfall in 668, established the Kingdom of Jin (진; 震), which was renamed to Parhae after 713. To the south of Parhae, Silla controlled the Korean peninsula south of the Taedong River, and Manchuria (now northeastern China) was conquered by Parhae. Parhae considered itself (particularly in diplomatic correspondence with Japan) a successor state of Goguryeo.

In 901, the general Gung Ye rebelled against Later Silla and founded Later Goguryeo (renamed to Taebong in 911), which considered itself to be a successor of Goguryeo. Later Goguryeo originated in the northern regions, including Songak (modern Kaesong), which were the strongholds of Goguryeo refugees. Later Goguryeo's original capital was established in Songak, the hometown of Wang Geon, a prominent general under Gung Ye. Wang Geon was a descendant of Goguryeo and traced his ancestry to a noble Goguryeo clan. In 918, Wang Geon overthrew Gung Ye and established Goryeo, as the successor of Goguryeo, and laid claim to Manchuria as Goryeo's rightful legacy. Wang Geon unified the Later Three Kingdoms in 936, and Goryeo ruled the Korean peninsula until 1392.

In the 10th century, Parhae collapsed and much of its ruling class and the last crown prince Dae Gwang-hyeon fled to Goryeo. The Parhae refugees were warmly welcomed and included in the ruling family by Wang Geon, who felt a strong familial kinship with Parhae, thus unifying the two successor nations of Goguryeo.

== Government ==
Early Goguryeo was a federation of five tribes(called Obu in korean). The names of the five tribes were Yeonno, Jeolno, Soonno, Gwanno, and Gyeroo. The tribe that held kingship,which had the honorable title of Gochooka, was the Yeonno tribe, but the Gyeroo tribe later held the title. The five tribes later turned into five districts. As the autonomy of these five tribal collectives waned, regional officers were appointed with valley as a unit.As Goguryeo progressed into the 4th century, a regional administration unit arose that centred around fortresses that were built in the newly enlarged areas. From the 4th century to the early 6th century, The gun (roughly translated as counties) system began to be established in most of the regions controlled by Goguryeo, though not all, evidenced by the existence of 16 counties near the Han river and the nickname of a military post called Malyak, nicknamed the gundu (roughly translated as the head of county). The gun subdivision had sub subdivisions which was either a seong (fortress) or chon (village). The official that was governing the whole county was called a susa, though its names changed to Yoksal, Choryogunji and Rucho. Yoksal and Choryogunji had both military and civil capabilities, and its residence often assigned inside fortresses.

== Military ==
Goguryeo was a highly militaristic state. Goguryeo has been described as an empire by Korean scholars. Initially, there were four partially autonomous districts based on the cardinal directions, and a central district led by the monarch; however, in the first century the cardinal districts became centralized and administered by the central district, and by the end of the 3rd century, they lost all political and military authority to the monarch. In the 4th century, after suffering defeats against the Xianbei and Paekche during the reign of Gogukwon, Sosurim instituted military reforms that paved the way for Gwanggaeto's conquests. During its height, Goguryeo was able to mobilize 300,000 troops. Goguryeo often enlisted semi-nomadic vassals, such as the Mohe people, as foot soldiers. Every man in Goguryeo was required to serve in the military, or could avoid conscription by paying extra grain tax. A Tang treatise of 668 records a total of 675,000 displaced personnel and 176 military garrisons after the surrender of Bojang.

=== Equipment ===
The main projectile weapon used in Goguryeo was the bow. The bows were modified to be more composite and increase throwing ability on par with crossbows. To a lesser extent, stone-throwing machines and crossbows were also used. Polearms, used against the cavalry and in open order, were mostly spears. Two types of swords were used by Goguryeo warriors. The first was a shorter double-edged variant mostly used for throwing. The other was longer single-edged sword with minimal hilt and ring pommel, of eastern Han influence. The helmets were similar to helmets used by Central Asian peoples, decorated with wings, leathers and horsetails. The shield was the main protection, which covered most of the soldier's body. Goguryeo would likely have been the earliest Korean state to incorporate horses into combat, and artifacts like wall paintings indicate that horses and soldiers alike wore armor. Scholars and archaeologists posit that contemporary Korean and Japanese adversaries first encountered fortified Goguryeo mounted troops between the fourth and fifth centuries CE. The cavalry were called Gaemamusa (개마무사; 鎧馬武士), and similar in type to the Cataphract.

==== Hwandudaedo ====
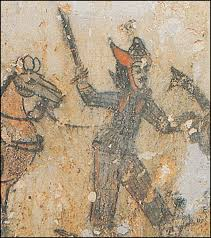
Hwandudaedo

Goguryeo used a sword called Hwandudaedo. It looks like the sword drawing in the following picture which is 2000 years old from an old Goguryeo tomb. As Korean swords changed from Bronze Age to Iron Age, the sword shapes changed. There are many archaeological finds on ancient Korean iron swords particularly the swords with a ring at the end.

=== Fortifications ===
The most common form of the Goguryeo fortress was one made in the shape of the moon, located between a river and its tributary. Ditches and ground walls between the shores formed an extra defense line. The walls were extensive in their length, and they were constructed from huge stone blocks fixed with clay, and even Chinese artillery had difficulty to break through them. Walls were surrounded by a ditch to prevent an underground attack, and equipped with guard towers. All fortresses had sources of water and enough equipment for a protracted siege. If rivers and mountains were absent, extra defense lines were added.

=== Organization ===
Two hunts per year, led by the king himself, maneuvers exercises, hunt-maneuvers and parades were conducted to give the Goguryeo soldier a high level of individual training.

There were five armies in the capital, mostly cavalry that were personally led by the king, numbering approximately 12,500. Military units varied in number from 21,000 to 36,000 soldiers, were located in the provinces, and were led by the governors. Military colonies near the boundaries consisted mostly of soldiers and peasants. There were also private armies held by aristocrats. This system allowed Goguryeo to maintain and utilize an army of 50,000 without added expense, and 300,000 through large mobilization in special cases.

Goguryeo units were divided according to major weapons: spearmen, axemen, archers composed of those on foot and horseback, and heavy cavalry that included armored and heavy spear divisions. Other groups like the catapult units, wall-climbers, and storm units were part of the special units and were added to the common. The advantage of this functional division is highly specialized combat units, while the disadvantage is that it was impossible for one unit to make complex, tactical actions.

=== Strategy ===
The military formation had the general and his staff with guards in the middle of the army. The archers were defended by axemen. In front of the general were the main infantry forces, and on the flanks were rows of heavy cavalry ready to counterattack in case of a flank attack by the enemy. In the very front and rear was the light cavalry, used for intelligence, pursuit, and for weakening the enemy's strike. Around the main troops were small groups of heavy cavalrymen and infantry. Each unit was prepared to defend the other by providing mutual support.

Goguryeo implemented a strategy of active defense based on cities. Besides the walled cities and fortified camps, this active defense system used small units of light cavalry to continuously harass the enemy, de-blockade units and strong reserves, consisting of the best soldiers, to strike hard at the end.

Goguryeo also employed military intelligence and special tactics as an important part of the strategy. Goguryeo was good at disinformation, such as sending only stone spearheads as tribute to the Chinese court when they were in the Iron Age. Goguryeo had developed its system of espionage. One of the most famous spies, Baekseok, mentioned in the Samguk yusa, was able to infiltrate the Hwarangs of Silla.

== Foreign relations ==
The militaristic nature of Goguryeo frequently drew them into conflicts with the dynasties of China. In the times when they are not in war with China, Goguryeo occasionally sent tributes to some of the Chinese dynasties as a form of trade and nonaggression pact. Like Buyeo before it, Goguryeo alternately offered tribute to and raided China. These activities of exchange promoted cultural and religious flow from China into the Korean peninsula. Goguryeo has also received tribute from other Korean kingdoms and neighboring tribal states, and frequently mobilized Malgal people in their military. Paekche and Goguryeo maintained their regional rivalry throughout their history, although they eventually formed an alliance in their wars against Silla and Tang.

== Culture ==
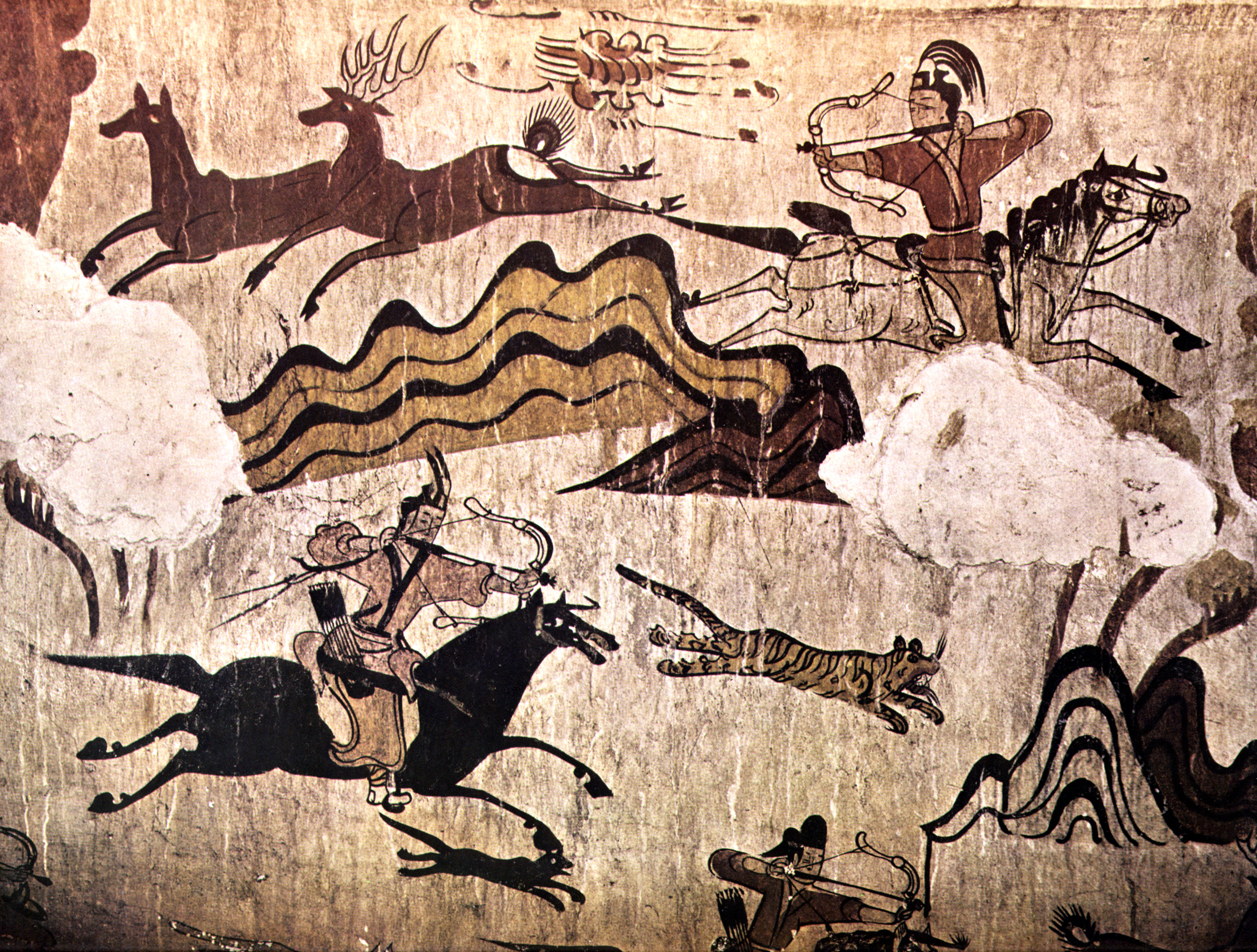
Muyongchong Suryeopdo

The culture of Goguryeo was shaped by its climate, religion, and the tense society that people dealt with due to the numerous wars Goguryeo waged.

The Book of Sui (Volume 81) recorded: "The customs, laws and clothes of Goguryeo, Paekche and Silla are generally identical."

Attributed with the earliest kimchi, the Goguryeo people were skilled at fermenting and widely consumed fermented food.

Singing and dancing played an important part in Goguryeo society, a legacy that, according to Kim Hunggyu, continues to this day in modern Korean society.

The practice of matrilocality in Korea started in the Goguryeo period, continued through the Goryeo period and ended in the early Joseon period. The Korean saying that when a man gets married, he is "entering jangga" (the house of his father-in-law), stems from the Goguryeo period.

Goguryeo held an annual national seokjeon (stone battle) attended by the king himself. Originally a product of the warlike Goguryeo period, seokjeon gradually evolved into a widely enjoyed pastime during the more peaceful Goryeo and Joseon periods.

The Korean tradition of mothers eating seaweed after birth originated in Goguryeo. The Korean word for seaweed, miyeok, originated in Goguryeo.

Goguryeo lies a thousand li to the east of Liaodong, being contiguous with Joseon and Yemaek on the south, with Okjeo on the east, and with Buyeo on the north. They make their capital below Hwando. With a territory perhaps two thousand li on a side, their households number three myriads. They have many mountains and deep valleys and have no plains or marshes. Accommodating themselves to mountain and valley, the people make do with them for their dwellings and food. With their steep-banked rivers, they lack good fields; and though they plow and till energetically, their efforts are not enough to fill their bellies; their custom is to be sparing of food. They like to build palaces... By temperament the people are violent and take delight in brigandage... As an old saying of the Dongyi would have it, they are a separate branch of the Buyeo. And indeed there is much about their language and other things they share with the Buyeo, but in temperament and clothing there are differences.

Their people delight in singing and dancing. In villages throughout the state, men and women gather in groups at nightfall for communal singing and games. They have no great storehouses, each family keeping its own small store... They rejoice in cleanliness, and they are good at brewing alcohol. When they kneel in obeisance, they extend one leg; in this they differ from the Buyeo. In moving about on foot they all run... In their public gatherings they all wear colorfully brocaded clothing and adorn themselves with gold and silver.

— Sanguo Zhi

=== Goguryeo tombs ===
The tombs of Goguryeo display the prosperity and artistry of the kingdom of the period. The murals inside many of the tombs are significant evidence of Goguryeo's lifestyle, ceremonies, warfare and architecture. Mostly tombs were founded in Ji'an in China's Jilin province, Taedong river basin near Pyongyang, North Korea and the Anak area in South Hwanghae province of North Korea. There are over 10,000 Goguryeo tombs overall, but only about 90 of those unearthed in China and North Korea have wall paintings. In 2004, Capital Cities and Tombs of the Ancient Koguryo Kingdom located in Ji'an of Jilin Province of China and Complex of Koguryo Tombs located in North Korea became a UNESCO World Heritage Site.

=== Lifestyle ===
The inhabitants of Goguryeo wore a predecessor of the modern hanbok, just as the other cultures of the three kingdoms. There are murals and artifacts that depict dancers wearing elaborate white dresses.

=== Festivals and pastimes ===
Common pastimes among Goguryeo people were drinking, singing, or dancing. Games such as wrestling attracted curious spectators.

Every October, the Dongmaeng Festival was held. The Dongmaeng Festival was practiced to worship the gods. The ceremonies were followed by huge celebratory feasts, games, and other activities. Often, the king performed rites to his ancestors.

Hunting was a male activity and also served as an appropriate means to train young men for the military. Hunting parties rode on horses and hunted deer and other game with bows-and-arrows. Archery contests also occurred.

=== Religion ===
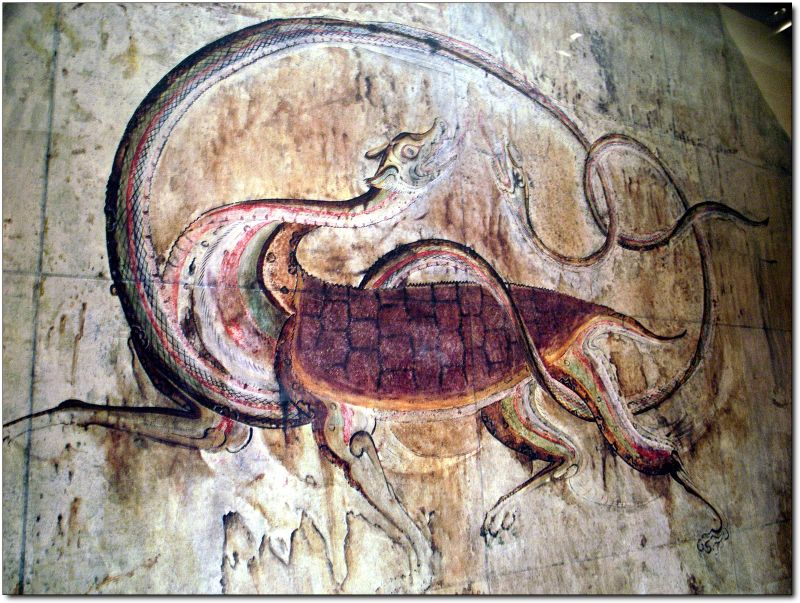
Mural of Black Tortoise of the Four Symbols.

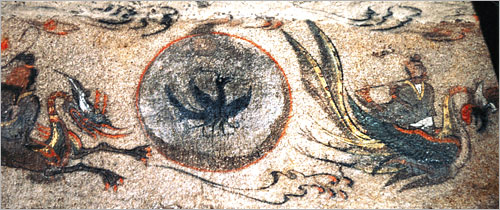
A mural of a Chinese mythical animal, three-legged bird in a Goguryeo tomb.

Goguryeo people worshipped ancestors and considered them to be supernatural. Jumong, the founder of Goguryeo, was worshipped and respected among the people. There was even a temple in Pyongyang dedicated to Jumong. At the annual Dongmaeng Festival, a religious rite was performed for Jumong, ancestors, and gods.

Mythical beasts and animals were also considered to be sacred in Goguryeo. The Fenghuang and Loong were both worshipped, while the Sanzuwu, the three-legged crow that represented the sun, was considered the most powerful of the three. Paintings of mythical beasts exist in Goguryeo king tombs today.

They also believed in the 'Sasin', which were 4 mythical animals. Chungryong or Chunryonga (blue dragon) guarded the east, baek-ho (white tiger) guarded the west, jujak (red phoenix (bird)) guarded the south, and hyunmu (black turtle, sometimes with snakes for a tail) guarded the north.

Buddhism was first introduced to Goguryeo in 372. The government recognized and encouraged the teachings of Buddhism and many monasteries and shrines were created during Goguryeo's rule, making Goguryeo the first kingdom in the region to adopt Buddhism. However, Buddhism was much more popular in Silla and Paekche, which Goguryeo passed Buddhism to.

Buddhism, a religion originating in what is now India, was transmitted to Korea via China in the late 4th century. The Samguk yusa records the following 3 monks among first to bring the Buddhist teaching, or Dharma, to Korea: Malananta (late 4th century) – an Indian Buddhist monk who brought Buddhism to Paekche in the southern Korean peninsula, Sundo – a Chinese monk who brought Buddhism to Goguryeo in northern Korea, and Ado monk who brought Buddhism to Silla in central Korea.

Xian and Taoists seeking to become immortals were thought to aid in fortune telling and divination about the future.

=== Cultural legacy ===
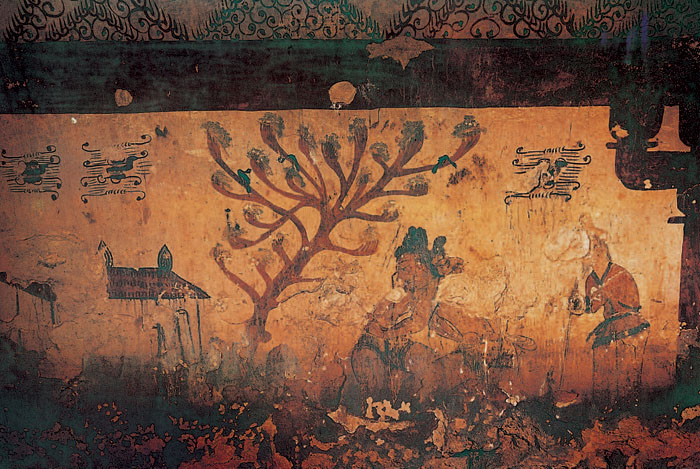
Ssireum depicted on Goguryeo mural

As the Three Kingdoms period emerged, each Korean state sought ideologies that could validate their authority. Many of these states borrowed influences from Chinese culture, sharing a writing system that was originally based on Chinese characters. However the language was different and not mutually intelligible with Chinese. An integral part of Goguryeo's culture, along with other Korean states, was Korean shamanism. In the 4th century, Buddhism gained wide prominence in Paekche and spread rapidly across the peninsula. Buddhism struck a careful balance between shamanism, the Korean people, and the rulers over these states, briefly becoming the official religion of all three kingdoms. Buddhism's foothold in the Korean peninsula would surge up to the Goryeo period and would spread rapidly into Yamato Japan, playing a key role in the neighboring state's development and its relations with the Korean peninsula.

In Paekche, King Onjo founded the kingdom and according to legend, he is the third son of Jumong of Goguryeo and the younger brother of King Yuri, Goguryeo's second king. The Korean Kingdoms of Parhae and Goryeo regarded themselves as successors to Goguryeo, recognized by Tang China and Yamato Japan.

Goguryeo art, preserved largely in tomb paintings, is noted for the vigour and fine detail of its imagery. Many of the art pieces have an original style of painting, depicting various traditions that have continued throughout Korea's history.

Cultural legacies of Goguryeo are found in modern Korean culture, for example: Korean fortress, ssireum, taekkyeon, Korean dance, ondol (Goguryeo's floor heating system) and the hanbok.

== Legacy ==
Remains of walled towns, fortresses, palaces, tombs, and artifacts have been found in North Korea and Manchuria, including ancient paintings in a Goguryeo tomb complex in Pyongyang. Some ruins are also still visible in present-day China, for example at Wunü Mountain, suspected to be the site of Jolbon fortress, near Huanren in Liaoning province on the present border with North Korea. Ji'an is also home to a large collection of Goguryeo era tombs, including what Chinese scholars consider to be the tombs of Gwanggaeto and his son Jangsu, as well as perhaps the best-known Goguryeo artifact, the Gwanggaeto Stele, which is one of the primary sources for pre-5th-century Goguryeo history.

=== World Heritage Site ===
UNESCO added Capital Cities and Tombs of the Ancient Koguryo Kingdom in present-day China and Complex of Koguryo Tombs in present-day North Korea to the World Heritage Sites in 2004.

=== Name ===
The modern English name "Korea" derives from Goryeo (also spelled as Koryŏ) (918–1392), which regarded itself as the legitimate successor of Goguryeo. The name Goryeo was first used during the reign of Jangsu in the 5th century. Goguryeo is also referred to as Goryeo after 520 AD in Chinese and Japanese historical and diplomatic sources.

== Language ==
There have been some academic attempts to reconstruct the Goguryeo words based on the fragments of toponyms, recorded in the Samguk sagi, of the areas once possessed by Goguryeo. However, the reliability of the toponyms as linguistic evidence is still in dispute. The linguistic classification of the language is difficult due to the lack of historical sources. The most cited source, a body of placename glosses in the Samguk sagi, has been interpreted by different authors as Koreanic, Japonic, or an intermediate between the two. Lee and Ramsey also look broadly to include Altaic and/or Tungusic.

Chinese records suggest that the languages of Goguryeo, Buyeo, East Okjeo, and Gojoseon were similar, while they differed from that of the Malgal (Mohe).

== Controversies ==
Goguryeo was viewed as a Korean kingdom in premodern China, but in modern times, there is a dispute between China and Korea over whether Goguryeo can be considered part of Chinese history or if it is part of Korean history.

North Korea's request to launch a joint excavation project in Northeast China was granted by the PRC government in 1963. The project was a two-year long collaboration between the two countries' archaeologists to excavate antiquities, most of which would then be given away to North Korea for research. Due in large part to the close Sino-North Korean alliance at the time, China did not object to North Korea's stance of regarding Goguryeo as historically Korean. Nonetheless, several disagreements arose between the two countries' archaeologists over the interpretation of their findings. For instance, North Korean archaeologists tried to find evidence for their argument that Parhae was a continuation of Goguryeo, to the disagreement of their Chinese colleagues.

In 2002, Chinese government started a five-year research project on the history and current situation of the frontiers of Northeast China which lasted from 2002 to 2007. It was launched by the Chinese Academy of Social Science (CASS) and received financial support from both the Chinese government and the CASS.

The stated purpose of the Northeast Project was to use authoritative academic research to restore historical facts and protect the stability of Northeast China—a region sometimes known as Manchuria—in the context of the strategic changes that have taken place in Northeast Asia since China's "Reform and Opening" started in 1978. Two of the project's leaders accused some foreign scholars and institutions of rewriting history to demand territory from China or to promote instability in the frontier regions, hence the necessity of the Project.

The Project has been criticized for applying the contemporary vision of China as a "unified multiethnic state" to ancient ethnic groups, states and history of the region of Manchuria and northern Korea. According to this idea, there was a greater Chinese state in the ancient past. Accordingly, any pre-modern people or state that occupied any part of what is now the People's Republic of China is defined as having been part of Chinese history. Similar projects have been conducted on Inner Mongolia, Tibet and Xinjiang, which have been named North Project, Southwest Project and Xinjiang Project respectively.

Due to its claims on Gojoseon, Goguryeo and Parhae, the project sparked disputes with Korea. In 2004, this dispute threatened to lead to diplomatic disputes between the People's Republic of China and South Korea, although all governments involved seem to exhibit no desire to see the issue damage relations.

In 2004, the Chinese government made a diplomatic compromise, pledging not to place claims to the history of Goguryeo in its history textbooks. The compromise has been maintained as of 2020, with middle school and high school textbooks in China labelling Goguryeo to be outside the border of ancient China.

== See also ==
- History of Korea
- Goryeo
- Parhae
- Later Goguryeo
- Military history of Goguryeo
