= Tomb of the General =

Goguryeo-era tomb in Ji'an, China

UNESCO World Heritage Site
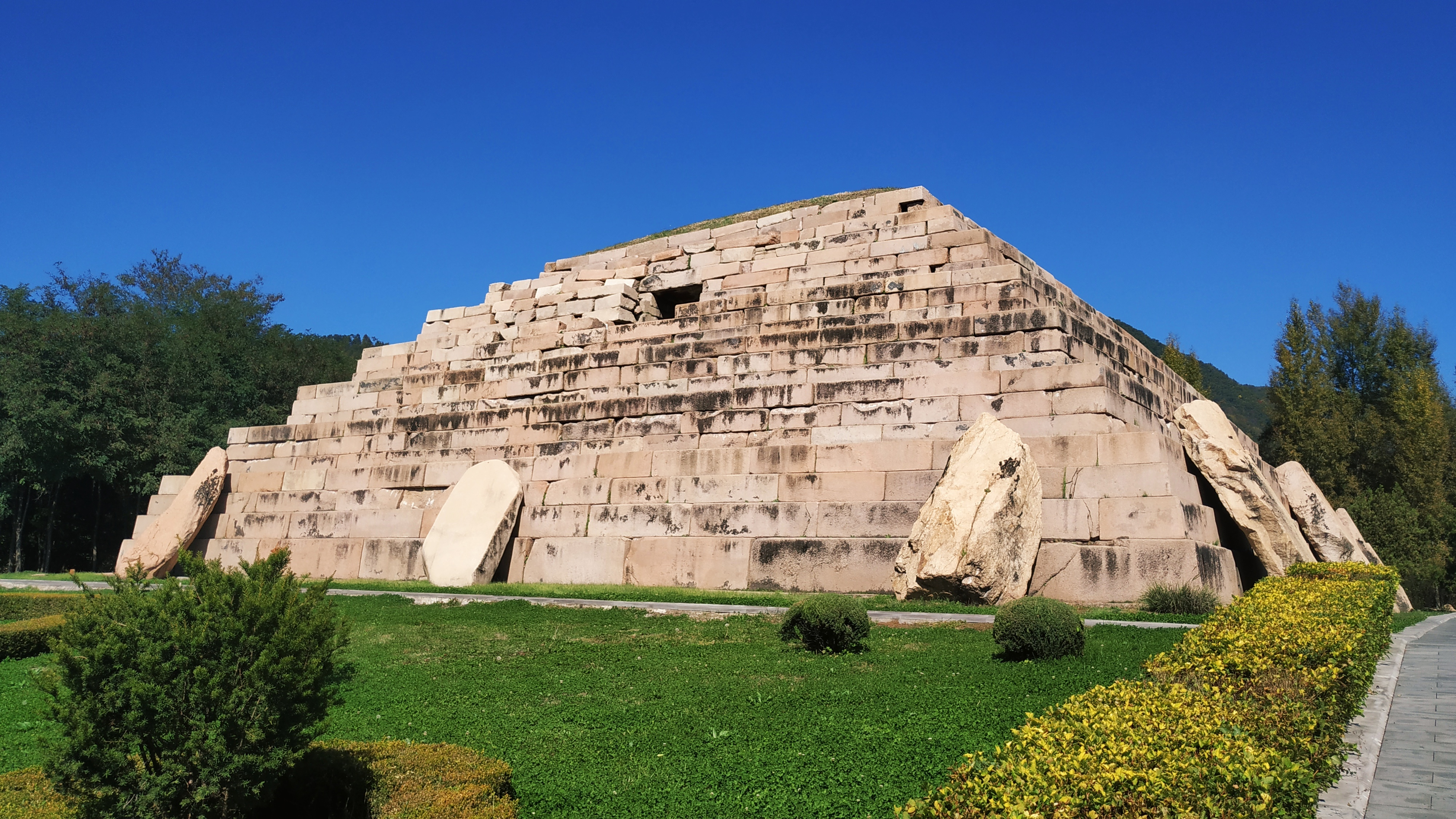
- The Tomb of the General

- Location within Jilin Location within China
- Location: Liaoning and Jilin in China
- Includes: Wunu Mountain City; Guonei City; Wandu Mountain City; Ranmou Tomb; Huanwen Tomb; Changchuan Tomb
- Criteria: Cultural: (i)(ii)(iii)(iv)(v)
- Reference: 1135
- Inscription: 2004 (28th Session)
- Area: 4,164.8599 ha (10,291.593 acres)
- Buffer zone: 14,142.4404 ha (34,946.731 acres)
- Coordinates: 41°08′45″N 126°11′49″E

The Tomb of the General (Korean: 장군총; Chinese: 將軍冢) is an ancient Korean pyramid, also known as the Pyramid of the East. The pyramid is thought to be the burial tomb of King Gwanggaeto or his son King Jangsu, both former Kings of Goguryeo.

The pyramid is located in what was formerly known as Gungnae, one of the capitals of Goguryeo, currently Ji'an, Jilin province, China. The pyramid was "rediscovered" in 1905.

The base of the pyramid measures approximately 75 meters on each side, about half the size of the Egyptian pyramids and is eleven meters in height. The pyramid is composed of 1,100 dressed stone blocks. Large stones, each measure approximately 3 × 5 meters were placed around the base of the pyramid and can still be seen today. The monumental size of the tomb is a testament to the power of the Goguryeo elite and the ability of this ancient kingdom to mobilize large numbers of people for building projects.

The pyramid-style tomb was typical of Goguryeo culture and was transmitted to the kingdom of Baekje's burial practices. The body of the dead elite was placed on a "stone base, surrounded by stones, and then surmounted by a rectangular platform or pyramid of dressed stones." The design of the tombs incorporated entrances and passageways which facilitated grave robbery so, like most Goguryeo and Baekje tombs, the General's Tomb contains no archaeological artifacts. Four dolmen tombs were also placed on each corner of the pyramid.

Kim Il Sung's reconstruction of the supposed tomb of Dangun is based on the Tomb of the General.

== See also ==
- Three Kingdoms of Korea
- History of Korea
- Korean architecture
