= Goguryeo–Wei War =

Invasions into Goguryeo by Cao Wei forces (244-245)

Goguryeo–Wei Wars
- Part of the wars of the Three Kingdoms period
Date	244–245
Location	Manchuria and the Korean Peninsula
Result	Cao Wei victory

Belligerents
Cao Wei; Wuhuan; Murong Xianbei	Goguryeo; Okjeo; Ye

Commanders and leaders
Guanqiu Jian; Wang Qi; Liu Mao; Gong Zun; Kouloudun; Murong Muyan	King Dongcheon; Marquis of Bunai

Strength
10,000	20,000

Casualties and losses
6,000?	8,000~18,000

The Goguryeo–Wei War was a series of invasions of Goguryeo from 244 to 245 launched by Cao Wei.

The invasions, a retaliation against a Goguryeo raid in 242, destroyed the Goguryeo capital of Hwando, sent its king fleeing, and broke the tributary relationships between Goguryeo and the other tribes of the Korean Peninsula that formed much of Goguryeo's economy. Although the king evaded capture and would go on to settle in a new capital, Goguryeo was greatly diminished for a time, and would spend the next half century rebuilding its ruling structure and regaining control over its people, unmentioned by the Chinese historical texts.

By the time Goguryeo reappeared in Chinese annals, the state had evolved into a much more powerful political entity—thus the Wei invasion was identified by historians as a watershed moment in Goguryeo history that divided the different stages of Goguryeo's growth. In addition, the campaigns provided the earliest descriptions of the peoples who lived in the Korean peninsula and Manchura.

== Background ==
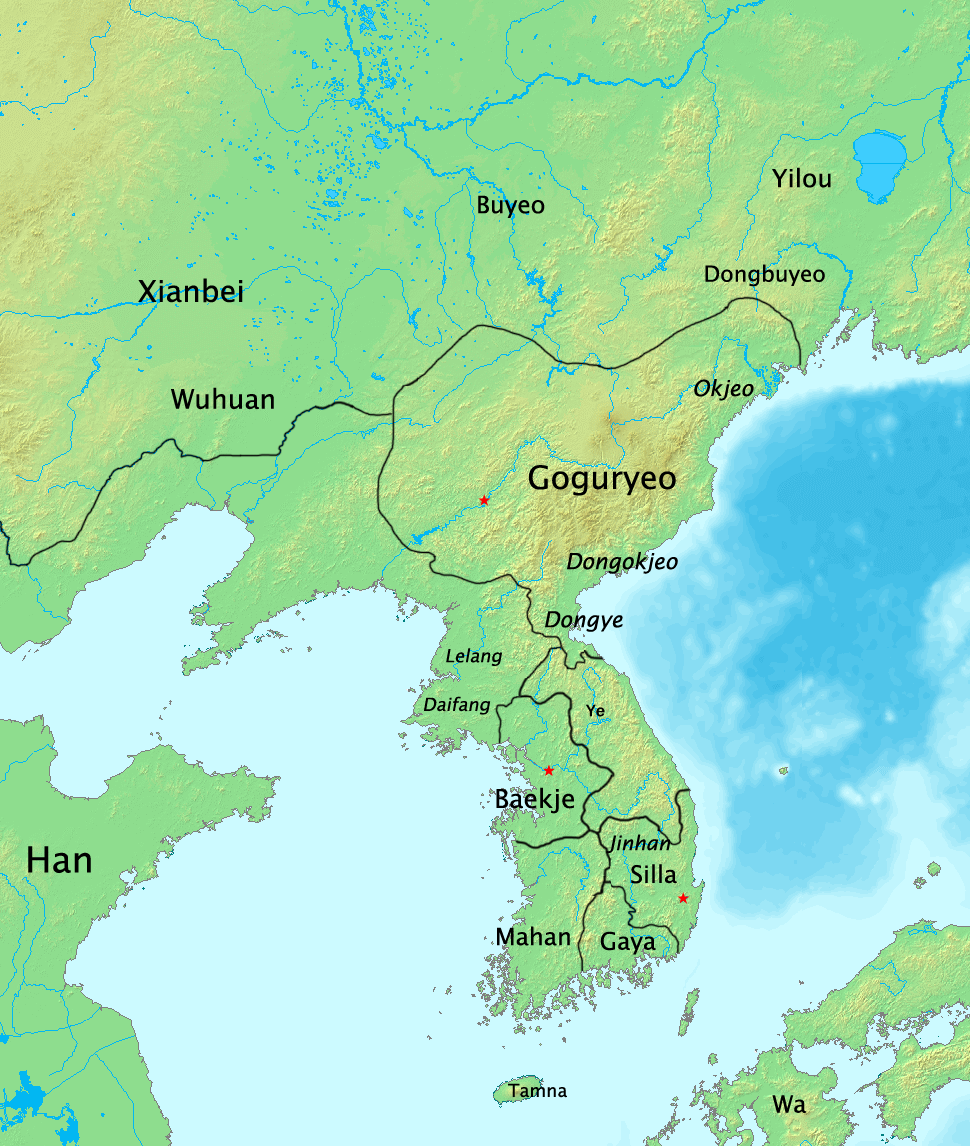
Manchuria and the Korean Peninsula after Gongsun Kang's exploitation of the succession feud, 204. The red star in Goguryeo represents the location of the new capital, Hwando.

The polity of Goguryeo developed among the peoples of Manchuria and the Korean Peninsula during the 1st and 2nd century BC as the Western Han dynasty extended its control to Northeast Asia, creating the Four Commanderies of Han. As it grew and centralized, Goguryeo increasingly contacted and conflicted with the Han dynasty. Goguryeo consolidated its power by conquering the territories on the north of the peninsula which were under Han rule. When the power of the Han dynasty declined to internal turmoil in the 2nd century AD, the warlord Gongsun Du came to control the commanderies of Liaodong and Xuantu, directly adjacent to Goguryeo. Gongsun Du's faction often quarrelled with Goguryeo despite initial cooperation, and the conflict culminated in the Goguryeo succession feud of 204, which Gongsun Du's successor Gongsun Kang exploited. Though the candidate supported by Gongsun Kang was eventually defeated, the victor Sansang of Goguryeo was compelled to move his capital southeast to Hwando (present-day Ji'an, Jilin) on the Yalu River, which offered better protection. Gongsun Kang moved in and restored order to the Lelang Commandery and established the new Daifang Commandery by splitting the southern part of Lelang.

Compared to the agriculturally rich former capital Jolbon, Hwando was situated in a mountainous region with little arable land. To sustain the economy, Hwando had to constantly extract resources from the peoples in the countryside, which included the tribal communities of Okjeo and Ye. The Okjeo were said to have worked as virtual slaves to the Goguryeo king, hauling provisions (such as cloth, fish, salt and other sea products) from the peninsula's northeast to the Yalu basin, reflecting the arrangement that Goguryeo had to adopt after the entry of Gongsun Kang. By the 230s, Goguryeo had regathered their strength from these tributary relations and regained their presence in the Jolbon region. In 234, the Han dynasty's successor state Cao Wei established friendly contact with Goguryeo, and in 238 an alliance between Wei and Goguryeo destroyed their common enemy Gongsun Yuan, the last of the Gongsun warlords (See Sima Yi's Liaodong campaign). Wei took over all of Gongsun Yuan's territories, including Lelang and Daifang — now Wei's influence was extended into the Korean Peninsula, adjacent to Goguryeo. However, Han population plummeted in Liaodong as Wei engaged in a large-scale purge of all who served Gongsun Yuan and relocated the coastal populace to Shandong in response to a sea raid from the enemy state Eastern Wu.

The alliance between Goguryeo and Wei broke down in 242, when King Dongcheon of Goguryeo sent men to plunder the Liaodong district of Xi'anping (西安平; near present-day Dandong, Liaoning) at the mouth of the Yalu River. Xi'anping was an important area that had been under Goguryeo control in the early 230s but was overrun by Wei forces during the Liaodong campaign in 238. It was crucial agricultural land that was home to the "Small River Maek" (小水貊) people, a branch of the Goguryeo people known for their excellent bows. In addition, Xi'anping provided Goguryeo with sea access, from where Goguryeo communicated with Eastern Wu in the past. Finally, a Goguryeo presence there would cut off the land routes between the Central Plain and the Cao Wei commanderies on the Korean Peninsula. The Cao Wei court reacted most strongly to this apparent threat to their control of Lelang and Daifang.

== Battle of Liangkou ==
In response to Goguryeo's aggression, the Inspector of You Province (幽州刺史), Guanqiu Jian, set out from Xuantu Commandery into Goguryeo with seven legions — amounting to 10,000 infantry and cavalry in total — in 244. From the seat of government in Xuantu (near present-day Shenyang, Liaoning), Guanqiu Jian's army went up the valley of the Suzi River (蘇子河), a tributary of the Hunhe River, to present-day Xinbin County, and from there crossed the watershed to the east and entered the Hunjiang River valley. King Dongcheon marched with 20,000 infantry and cavalry out from his capital Hwando to meet the advancing army. The king's army travelled through several river valleys and met Guanqiu Jian's army at the junction of the Fu'er River (富爾江) and the Hunjiang River, a place known as Liangkou (梁口; present-day Jiangkou village 江口村 in Tonghua). Liangkou was to become the site of the first battles between Guanqiu Jian and King Dongcheon.

Sources differ on how the battles played out. The 12th century Korean source Samguk Sagi states that Guanqiu Jian's army invaded in the eighth lunar month of the year, but was twice defeated before winning the crucial battle that sent the king back to the capital. The first battle, according to Samguk Sagi, pitted King Dongcheon's 20,000 foot and horse soldiers against Guanqiu Jian's 10,000-man-strong army on the Hunjiang River, which Goguryeo won and beheaded 3,000 Wei soldiers. The second engagement was described to have happened in a "Dale of Liangmo" (梁貊之谷), where Goguryeo again bested and captured and killed 3,000 more soldiers. The two victories seemed to have got into the king's head as he remarked to his generals: "The Wei army, so enormous, cannot match a small force of ours, Guanqiu Jian is a great general of Wei, and today his life is in my hands!" He then led 5,000 ironclad horsemen to lead the charge against Guanqiu Jian, who put his troops in square formation and fought desperately. In the end, 18,000 Goguryeo men were killed in this last battle, and the defeated king fled to the Plain of Yalu (鴨綠原) with a little more than a thousand horsemen.

In contrast, the near-contemporary "Biography of Guanqiu Jian" in volume 28 of Records of Three Kingdoms, containing the Chinese account of this battle, states that King Dongcheon was repeatedly defeated in the tremendous fight at Liangkou and was forced to flee. Japanese researcher Hiroshi Ikeuchi, writing in 1929 during Japan's period of colonial rule over Korea, asserts that the Korean account was transformed from Guanqiu Jian's biography, reversing the results of the battles before Liangkou. The same researcher also suggests that the aforementioned "Dale of Liangmo" place was fabricated by the biased historian sympathetic to Goguryeo. Nonetheless, both Chinese and Korean sources agree on the fact that King Dongcheon ultimately lost the battle of Liangkou and headed back to Hwando.

== Capture of Hwando ==
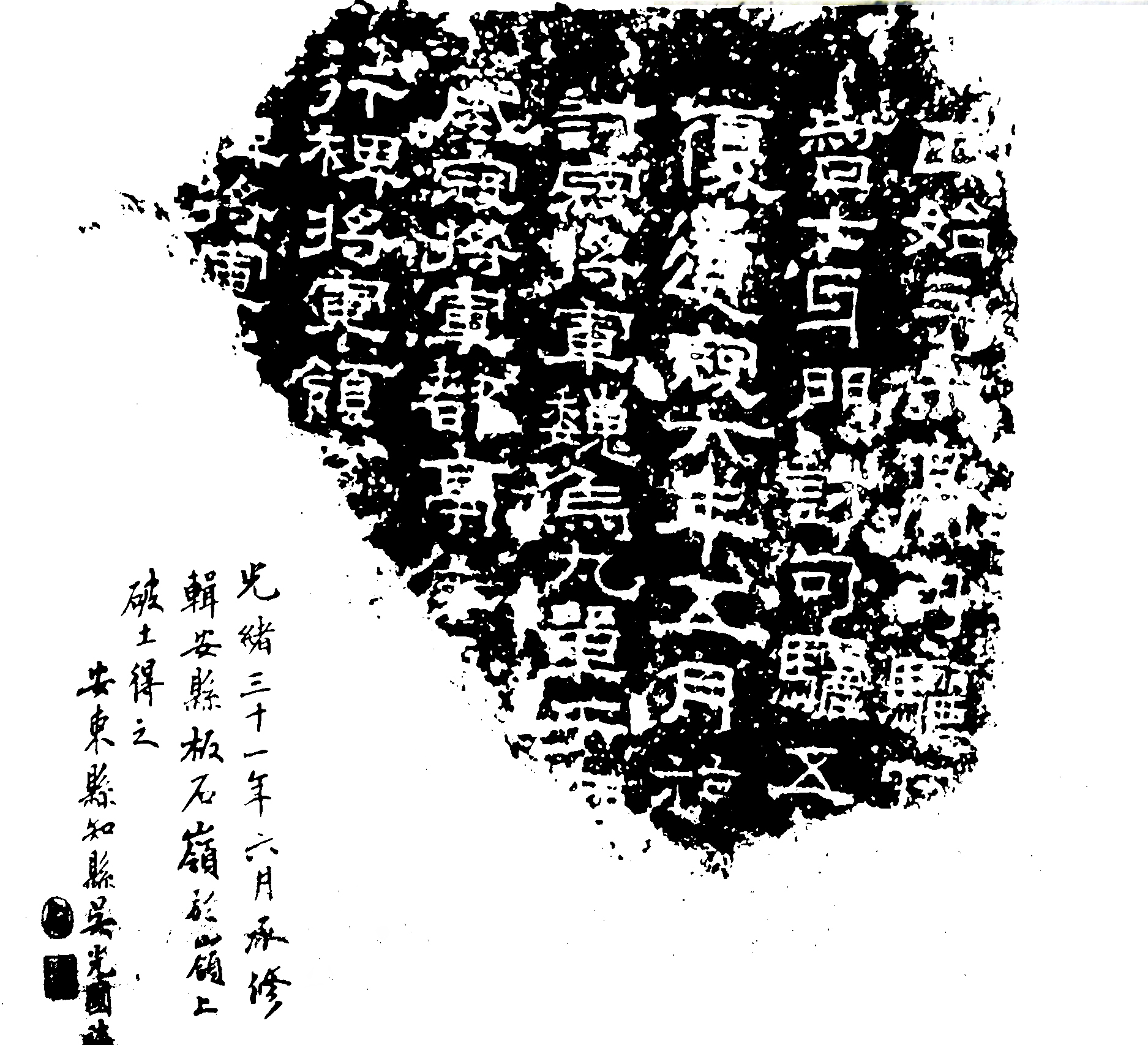
The rediscovered fragment of the Guanqiu Jian commemoration tablet.

The Wei army gave chase to the routed Goguryeo army after the battle of Liangkou. According to the Chinese source History of Northern Dynasties, Guanqiu Jian reached Chengxian (赬峴), determined to be the present-day mountain pass Xiaobancha Ridge (小板岔嶺), also called Banshi Ridge (板石嶺). Since the mountainous region rendered the cavalry ineffective, the Wei army fastened the horses and chariots there and climbed up to mountain city of Hwando. Guanqiu Jian first struck the stronghold guarding the main city and then descended upon the capital, where the Wei army wrought much destruction, slaughtering and capturing thousands of people. Guanqiu Jian specifically spared the tomb and family of Deukrae (得來), a Goguryeo minister who frequently remonstrated against aggression toward Wei and starved himself to death in protest when his advice went unheeded. The king and his family fled the capital.

With the Goguryeo capital subjugated, Guanqiu Jian returned to You Province with his army in around June 245. On the way back, he had a tablet erected in Chengxian commemorating his victory, explaining the course of events, and listing the generals who participated in the campaign. A fragment of the monument was discovered in 1905, near the end of the Qing dynasty, bearing the following mutilated inscription:

In the 3rd year of Zhengshi^{a} the Goguryeo [?invaded]...	正始三年高句驪[?寇]
...commanded the seven legions, and attacked the Goguryeo. In the 5th [?year]^{b}...	督七牙門討句驪五[?年]
...again the remaining enemies. In the 6th year, the 5th month^{c}, he led back [?his army]...	復遣寇六年五月旋[?師]
General Who Exterminates Invaders, Wuwan Chanyu of Wei^{d}...	討寇將軍魏烏丸單于
General Who Intimidates Invaders, Chief Village Marquis...	威寇將軍都亭侯
Expeditionary Major-General possessing...	行裨將軍領
...Major-General...	裨將軍

a. Corresponds to year 242.
b. Corresponds to year 244.
c. Corresponds to around June 245.
d. Identified as Kouloudun 寇婁敦, Wuhuan Chanyu of Youbeiping

== Pursuit of King Dongcheon ==
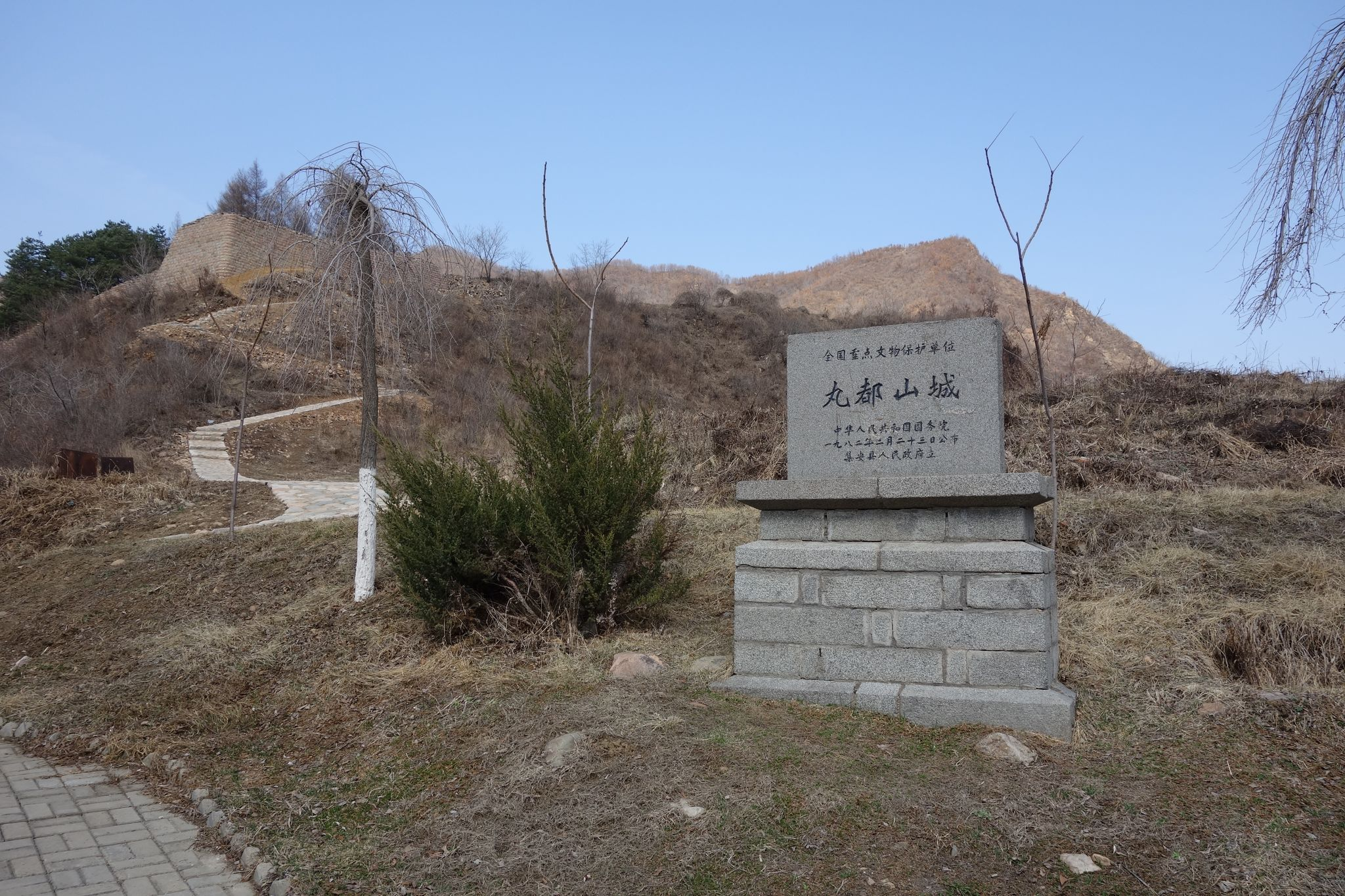
The ruins of Hwando, now part of the Capital Cities and Tombs of the Ancient Koguryo Kingdom UNESCO World Heritage Site

In the same year Guanqiu Jian sent the Grand Administrator of Xuantu, Wang Qi (王頎), in pursuit of the king, who is said to have fled with his nobles of several ranks to South Okjeo (also known as Dongokjeo, "East Okjeo"). According to the Samguk Sagi, the king's escape was aided by Milu (密友), a man of the Eastern District (東部), when the king's troops had all but scattered to the last handful at Jungnyeong Pass. Milu said to the king, "I will go back and hold the enemy at bay while you make good your escape," and held the narrow pass with three or four soldiers while the king made his way to regroup with a band of friendly troops. The king offered a reward to anyone who could bring Milu back to safety, and a Yu Okgu (劉屋句) found Milu lying on the ground with grievous injuries. The king was so delighted to recover his faithful retainer that he personally nursed Milu back to life.

The chase from Hwando to South Okjeo took the two parties across the Yalu (Amnok) River into the northern parts of the Korean Peninsula. The precise route of the chase may have passed by present-day Kanggye, from where there are two possibilities: one heading east through the Rangrim Mountains then south to present-day Changjin; the other following the Changja River south then turning east to reach Changjin. From Changjin, the pursuer and the pursued followed the Changjin River (長津江) south until they reached the vast and fertile Hamhung plains, where the river flowed into the East Korea Bay. It was here in Hamhung that the South Okjeo people thrived, and thus King Dongcheon came here for refuge. When Wang Qi's army arrived, however, the Okjeo tribes were all defeated, with 3,000 tribesmen killed or captured. The king fled again, and the Wei army turned toward North Okjeo.

The Samguk Sagi relates to an event that purported to have happened in South Okjeo: Yuyu (紐由), another man of the Eastern District, feigned the surrender of King Dongcheon to stop the Wei pursuit. Bearing food and gifts, Yuyu was allowed into the camp of an unnamed Wei general. When the general received him, Yuyu pulled out a hidden dagger from under the plates and fatally stabbed the Wei general. He was likewise killed by the attendants at the next moment, but the damage had been done — the Wei army, having lost their commander, was thrown into confusion. King Dongcheon took this opportunity to gather his forces and struck his enemy in three columns. The Wei armies, unable to recover from the confusion, "at last retired from Lelang". This passage was not paralleled in Chinese records.

Travelling along the coast of what is called the Sea of Japan today, Wang Qi's army made its way to the lands of the North Okjeo, assumed to be around the Jiandao area today. Despite records suggesting that the king came to the North Okjeo settlement of Maegu (買溝, also named Chiguru 置溝婁; in present-day Yanji), there is no telling what became of the king in North Okjeo, and Wang Qi's army returned to the Xuantu Commandery.

== Subjugation of the Ye ==
Concurrently, Guanqiu Jian sent a detached force to attack the Ye of eastern Korea since they were allied with Goguryeo. The force, led by the grand administrators of Lelang and Daifang, Liu Mao (劉茂) and Gong Zun (弓遵) respectively, started from South Okjeo and went south through the whole length of the region known as the Seven Counties of Lingdong (嶺東七縣). Six out of the seven counties — Dongyi (東暆), Bunai (不耐; also named Bu'er 不而), Chantai (蠶台), Huali (華麗), Yatoumei (邪頭昧), Qianmo (前莫) — submitted to Liu Mao and Gong Zun, while the remaining Wozu county (夭租縣), being identical with Okjeo, had already been subjugated by Wang Qi. In particular, the Marquis of Bunai, the pre-eminent county of the seven, was specified to have come surrendering with all his tribesmen. Liu Mao and Gong Zun's march along the eastern coast of Korea may have brought them as far south as Uljin, where the local elders informed them of an inhabited island to the east, an island which could possibly be Ulleungdo. Another inscription was erected at Bunai, supposedly to commemorate the feats of Wang Qi, Liu Mao, and Gong Zun during the second campaign; however, unlike the tablet attributable to Guanqiu Jian, this inscription has not been found.

== Aftermath and legacy ==
Although the king evaded capture, the Wei campaigns accomplished much to weaken the Goguryeo kingdom. Firstly, several thousands of the Goguryeo people were deported and resettled in China proper. Secondly, and more importantly, the intrusions into Okjeo and Ye separated these Goguryeo tributaries from its central ruling structure and brought them back under the influence of the commanderies of Lelang and Daifang. In doing so, Wang Qi and his peers removed a substantial part of the Goguryeo economy and dealt Goguryeo a blow more severe than Gongsun Kang did forty years ago. The Ye under the Marquis of Bunai became expected to provide provisions and transportation whenever Lelang and Daifang went off to war, and the marquis himself was elevated to Ye King of Bunai (不耐濊王) by the Cao Wei court in 247. In addition, Wang Qi's incursion into Buyeo's territory and the subsequent welcome by the hosts reconfirmed the friendly relations between Wei and Buyeo, and tributes from Buyeo to Wei would continue annually.

When King Dongcheon returned to Hwando, he found the city to be too ravaged by war and too close to the border to be a suitable capital, and thus relocated his capital to a "walled town in the plain" (平壤城, Pyeongyangseong) in 247, moving his people and sacred shrines while leaving Hwando to ruin. From this new capital, Goguryeo underwent significant reorganization, particularly in regards to its economic base, to recover from the devastation by the hands of Wei. Since the resources of Okjeo and Ye were deprived, Goguryeo had to rely on the production of the old capital region of Jolbon while looking for new agricultural lands in other directions.

The history of Goguryeo in the latter half of the 3rd century was characterized by Goguryeo's attempts to consolidate nearby regions and restore stability as it dealt with rebellions and foreign invaders, including Wei again during 259 in which Goguryeo defeated Wei at Yangmaek, and the Sushen during 280 in which Goguryeo launched a counterattack on the Sushen and occupied their capital. According to the Samguk Sagi, during the Wei invasion in 259, King Jungcheon assembled 5,000 of his elite cavalry and defeated the invading Wei army at a valley in Yangmaek, killing 8,000 enemies. Goguryeo's fortunes rose again during King Micheon's rule (300-331), when the king took advantage of the weakness in Wei's successor the Jin dynasty and wrestled the commanderies of Lelang and Daifang from central Chinese control. By this time, Goguryeo completed seventy years of recovery and was transformed "from a Chinese border state, existing mainly by the plunder of the Chinese outposts in the northeast, to a kingdom centred in Korea proper, in which the formerly independent tribal communities of the Okjeo and others had been merged."

In terms of historiography, the expedition is significant for providing detailed information on the various peoples of the Korean Peninsula, such as Goguryeo, Buyeo, Okjeo, and Ye. The expedition, unprecedented in scale in those regions, brought first-hand knowledge about the topography, climate, population, language, manners, and customs of these areas to Chinese cognizance, and was duly recorded into the Weilüe by the contemporary historian Yu Huan. Though the original Weilüe is now lost, its contents were preserved in the Records of Three Kingdoms, where the reports from the Goguryeo expedition are included in the "Chapter on Eastern Barbarians" (東夷傳, Dongyi Zhuan) — considered the most important single source of information for the culture and society of early states and peoples on the Korean Peninsula.
