= Wunü Peaks National Forest Park =

Protected area in Jilin, China

Coordinates: 41°16′26.93″N 126°7′3.96″E

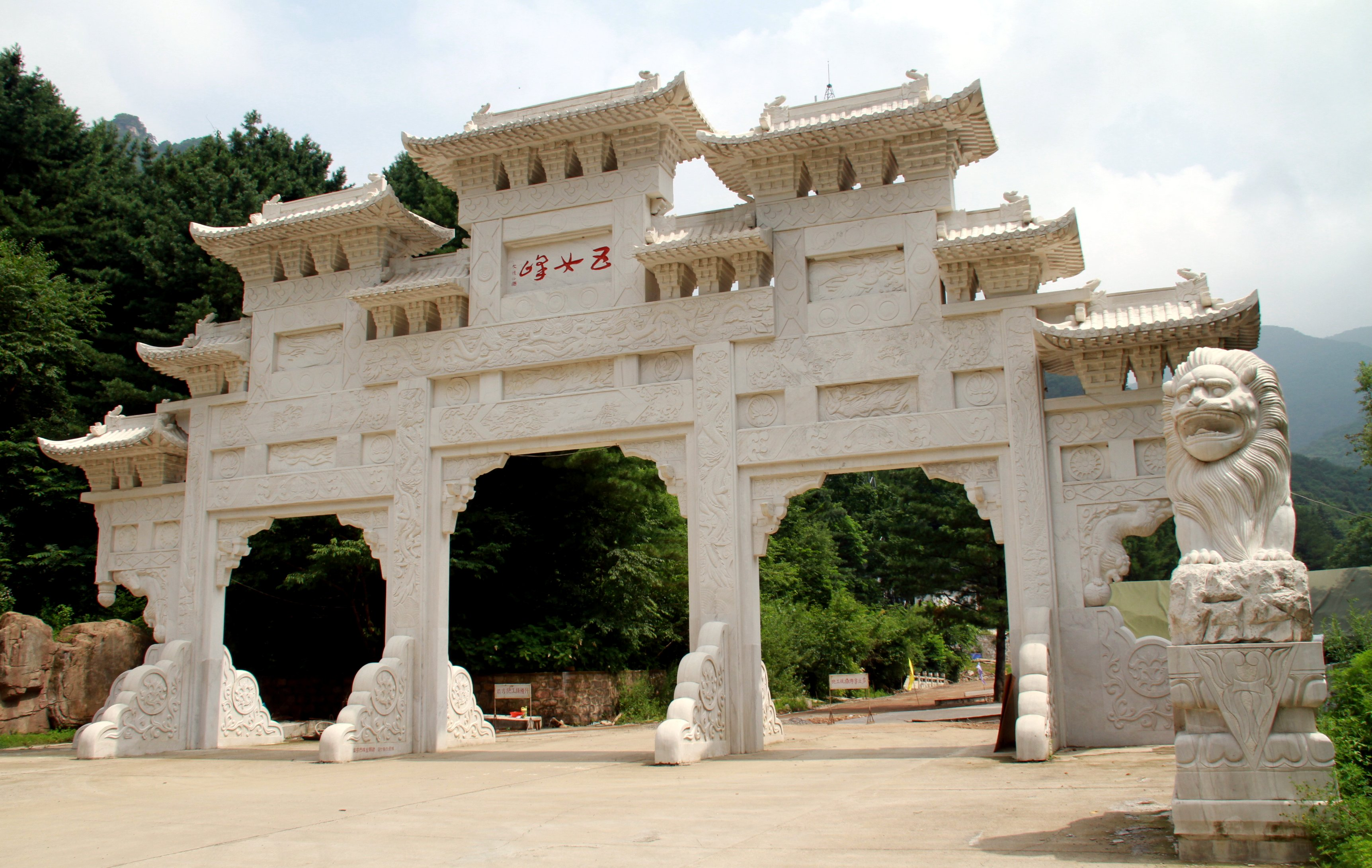
Entrance to the forest park

The Wunü Peaks National Forest Park (Chinese: 五女峰国家森林公园; pinyin: Wǔnǚfēng Guójiā Sēnlín Gōngyuán; lit. 'Five Women Peaks National Forest Park') is a protected forest area under the administration of Tonghua City and to the north of Ji'an in Jilin Province, China. The park extends over an area of 6867 hectares, 95% of which is covered by forest.

== See also ==
- Wunü Mountain
