= Wunü Mountain =

Landmass in Liaoning, China

UNESCO World Heritage Site
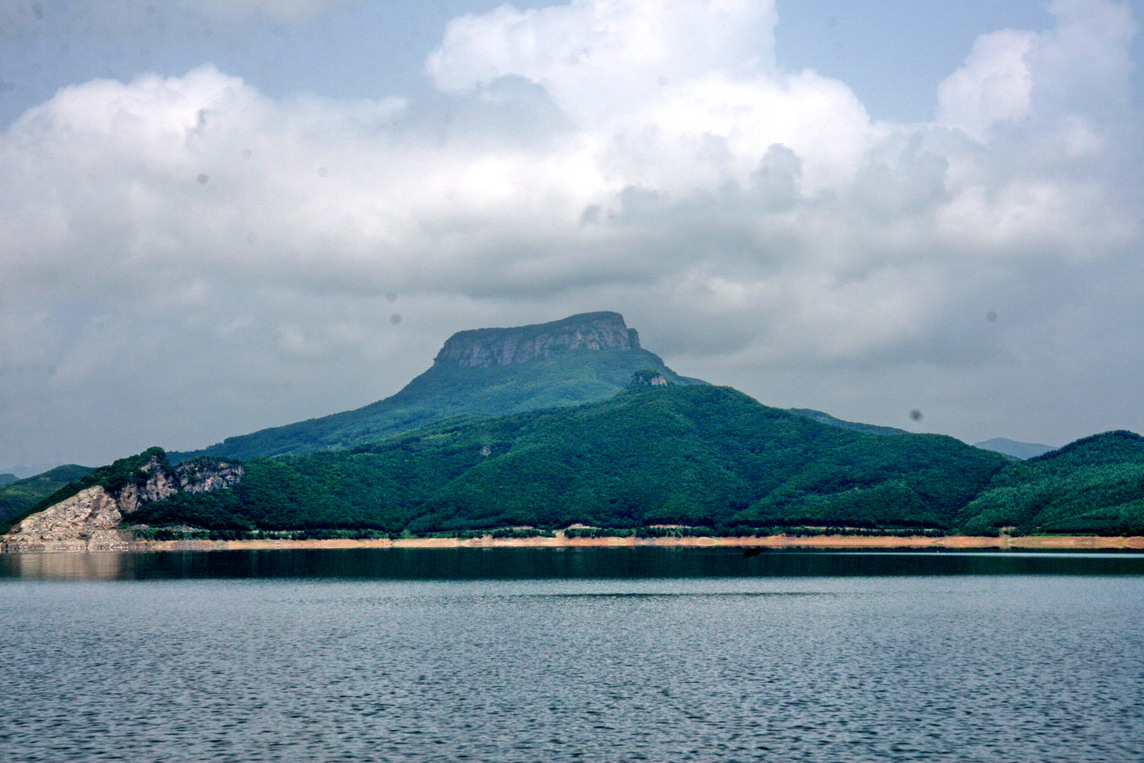
- Wunü Mountain

- Location within Liaoning Location within China
- Location: Liaoning and Benxi in China
- Includes: Wunu Mountain City; Guonei City; Wandu Mountain City; Ranmou Tomb; Huanwen Tomb; Changchuan Tomb
- Criteria: Cultural: (i)(ii)(iii)(iv)(v)
- Reference: 1135
- Inscription: 2004 (28th Session)
- Area: 4,164.8599 ha (10,291.593 acres)
- Buffer zone: 14,142.4404 ha (34,946.731 acres)
- Coordinates: 41°19′41″N 125°25′03″E

Wunü Shan (Chinese: 五女山; pinyin: Wǔnǚ Shān; Korean: 오녀산 Onyeosan), which means "mountain of Five Women", is a mountain of historical and cultural significance located in the north of the Huanren Town, in Huanren Manchu Autonomous County, Liaoning province, China. It is located northwest of the Hun Jiang River. The tallest peak is the 821 metre-high Main Peak, measuring 1,500 metres long and 300 metres wide.

Wunü Mountain is the location of Jolbon, the birthplace of the ancient Korean kingdom of Goguryeo and its capital from 37 BC to 3 AD. Because of its historical significance to the Goguryeo Kingdom and the exceptional architecture and city planning of Jolbon, Wunü Shan was inscribed on the UNESCO World Heritage List as the site "Capital Cities and Tombs of the Ancient Koguryo Kingdom", along with the nearby ancient cities of Gungnae and Hwando.

== History ==
Wunü Shan has a long history of human living. In recent years some archaeologists found historical remains and relics on the mountain, some of which date back to the late Neolithic Age, more than 4,500 years ago. Those relics also include weapons and tools which have thousands of years of history. According to the Samguk Sagi, the Kingdom of Goguryeo was founded above the mountain in 37 BC, and the mountain city remained its capital until King Yuri moved it to Gungnae Fortress in 3 AD. In contemporary sources, the city was called Holbon fortress(홀본성) in the Gwanggaeto Stele and Heulseunggol fortress(흘승골성) in Book of wei. During the North-South States Period in Unified Shilla, it was recorded as Jolbon fortress(졸본성).

However, there is an objection that Wunü Mountain was not Jolbon but was moved to the Gungnae fortress during the reign of Yuri, based on the topography of the fortress in the period of Daemusin recorded in Samguk Sagi, and that the relocation to Ji'an was probably made during the reign of King Sansang, who moved to Hwando. In this theory, 'Gungnae (國內)' is interpreted as 'Land with the capital', and Gungnae, which was moved to the capital during the reign of Yuri and the Gungnae fortress of Ji'an, are considered different fortress, and Jolbon is defined as Nahap Fortess (喇哈城) at the confluence of the Fu'er River and Hun river. However, in Samguk Sagi Book 13 History of Goguryeo Chapter 1, it describes Jumong lived in thatched house near the river as he wasn't unable to fund building the palace.

Today's name of Wunü Mountain derives from a Chinese legend that five ladies from the Tang Dynasty defended the mountain from foreign invaders.

The present-day fortress on the mountain date back to 1424, when Li Manzhu, the third chief of the Jianzhou Jurchens, built defensive fortifications on the southern side of the mountain.

== Natural significance ==
Wunü Shan is located in the north temperate zone so it has four distinct seasons. There are more than 60 natural tourist spots. In the spring and summer one will find flowers, trees, butterflies, and birds, and there are tourist ships that travel down the river. In the fall, the mountain turns red because of the famous Chinese sweet gums. In the winter, the mountain receives snow.

== Cultural significance ==
Wunü Shan has all the elements of a defensive city wall, temple, palace, barn, barracks, water source, and a city wall of more than 200 metres above sea level. Therefore, the Goguryeo kingdom could quarter at the mountain for extended periods in the cold weapon era.

== Prominence ==
- 1994 Awarded as the Most Protected Culture Relic
- 1999 One of the Top10 National Archaeological Discovery
- 2002 Rated as AAAA Class National Tourist Spot
- 2004 Inscribed on the UNESCO World Heritage List as part of the Capital Cities and Tombs of the Ancient Koguryo Kingdom.

== Gallery ==
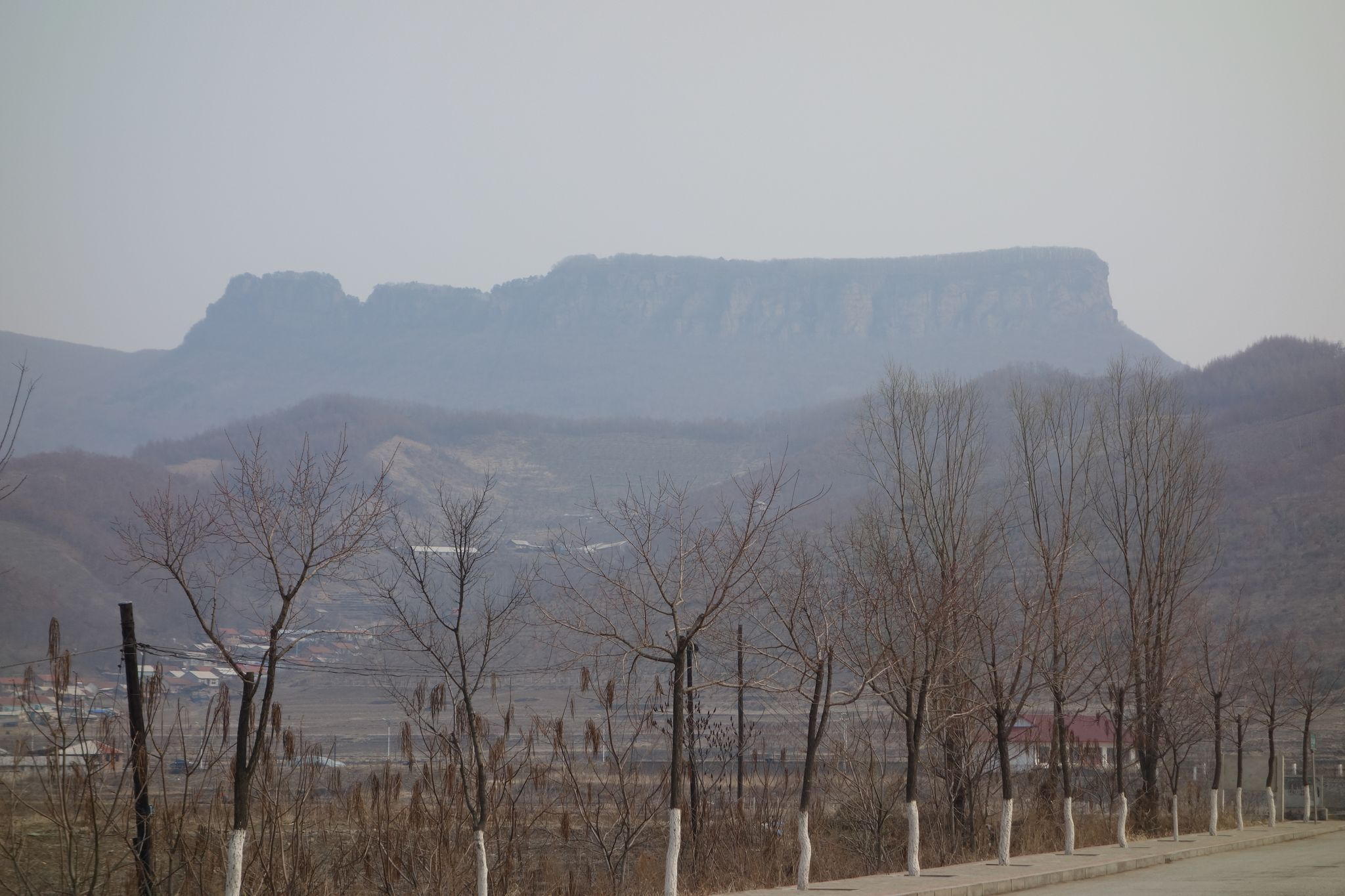
Sole-like profile of Wunü Mountain

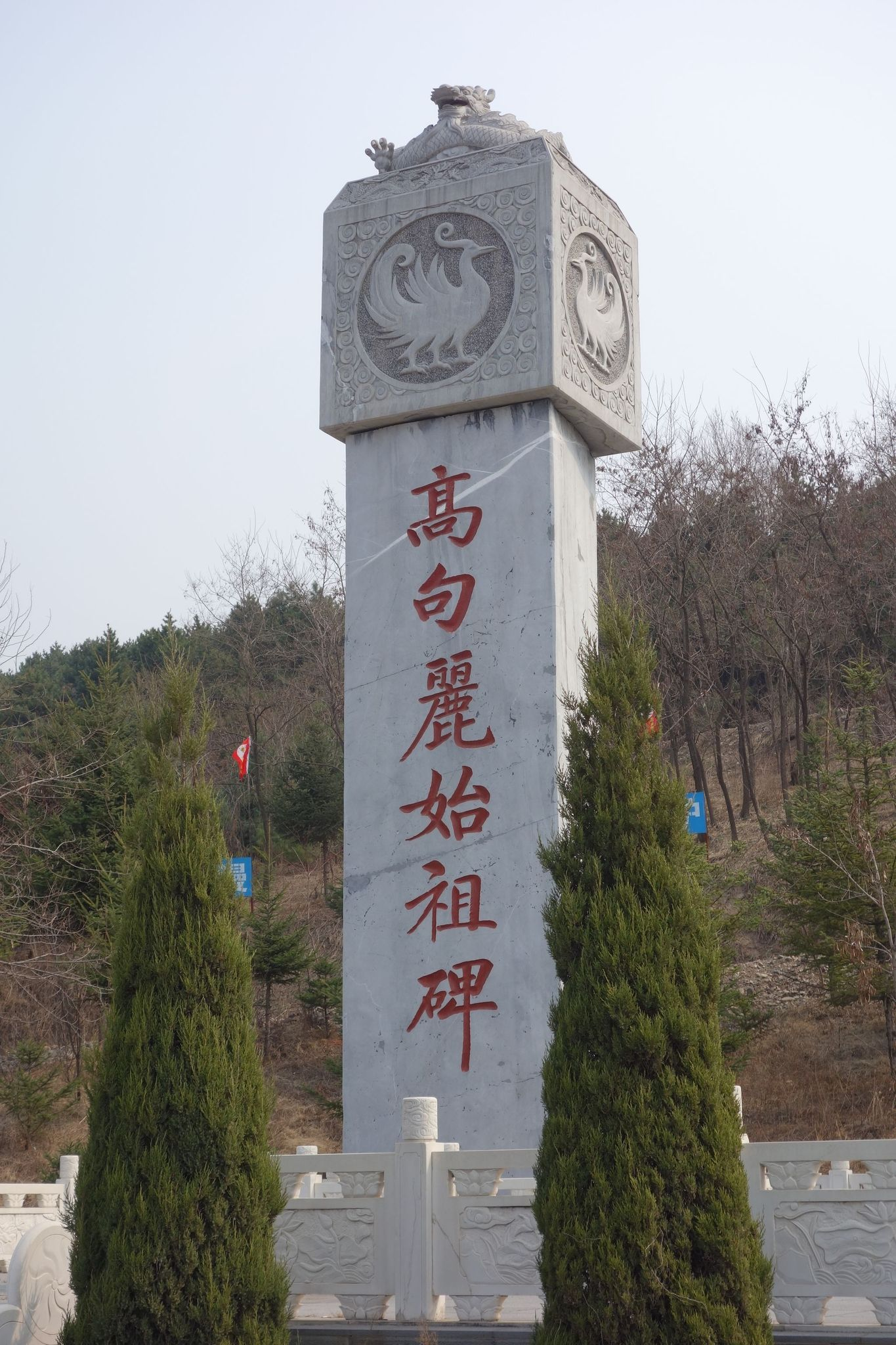
Present-day pillar at the entrance to the Wunü Mountain complex, with the three-legged bird finial

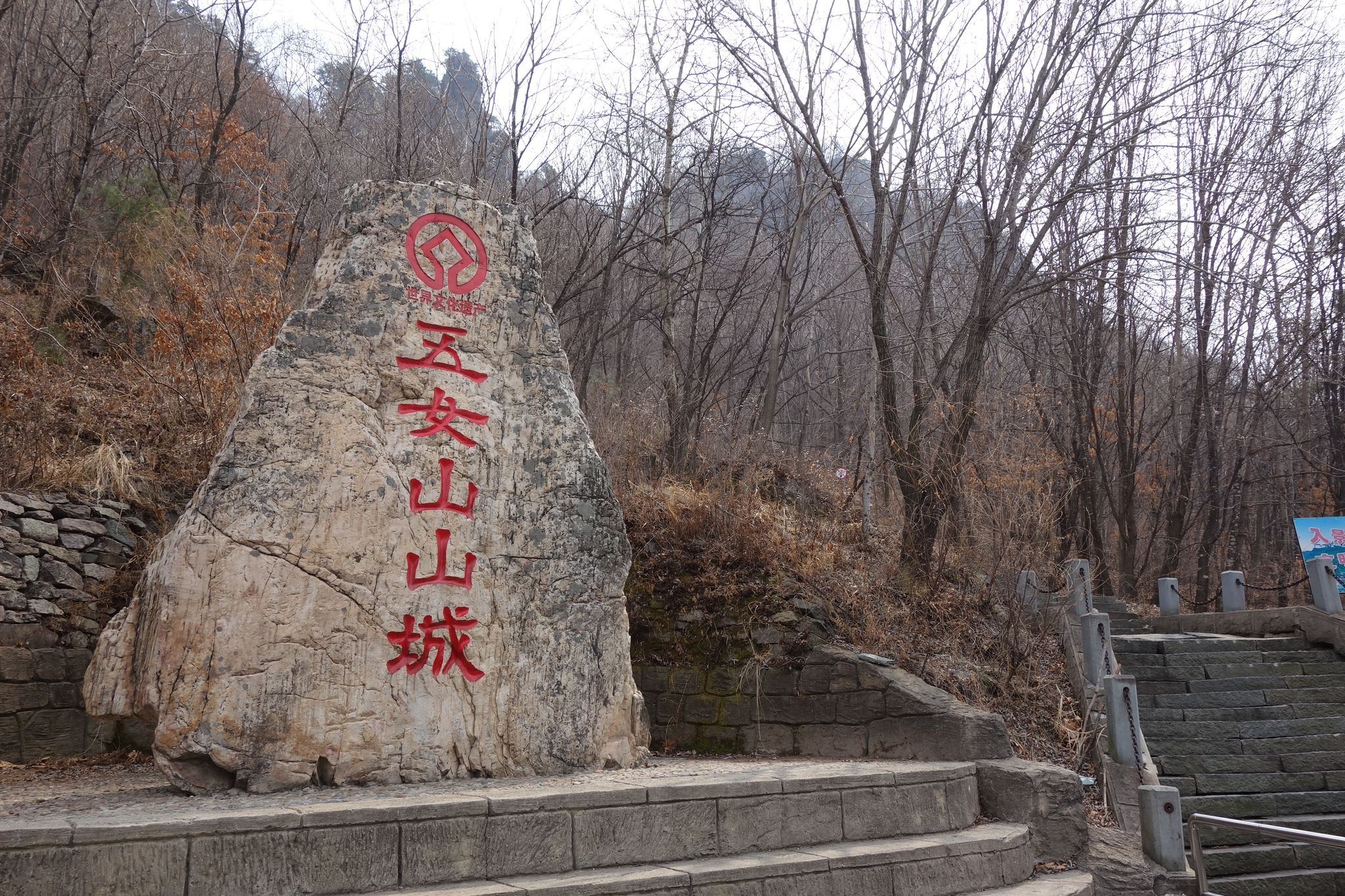
A rock inscribed with the name of Wunü Mountain City, and the UNESCO logo

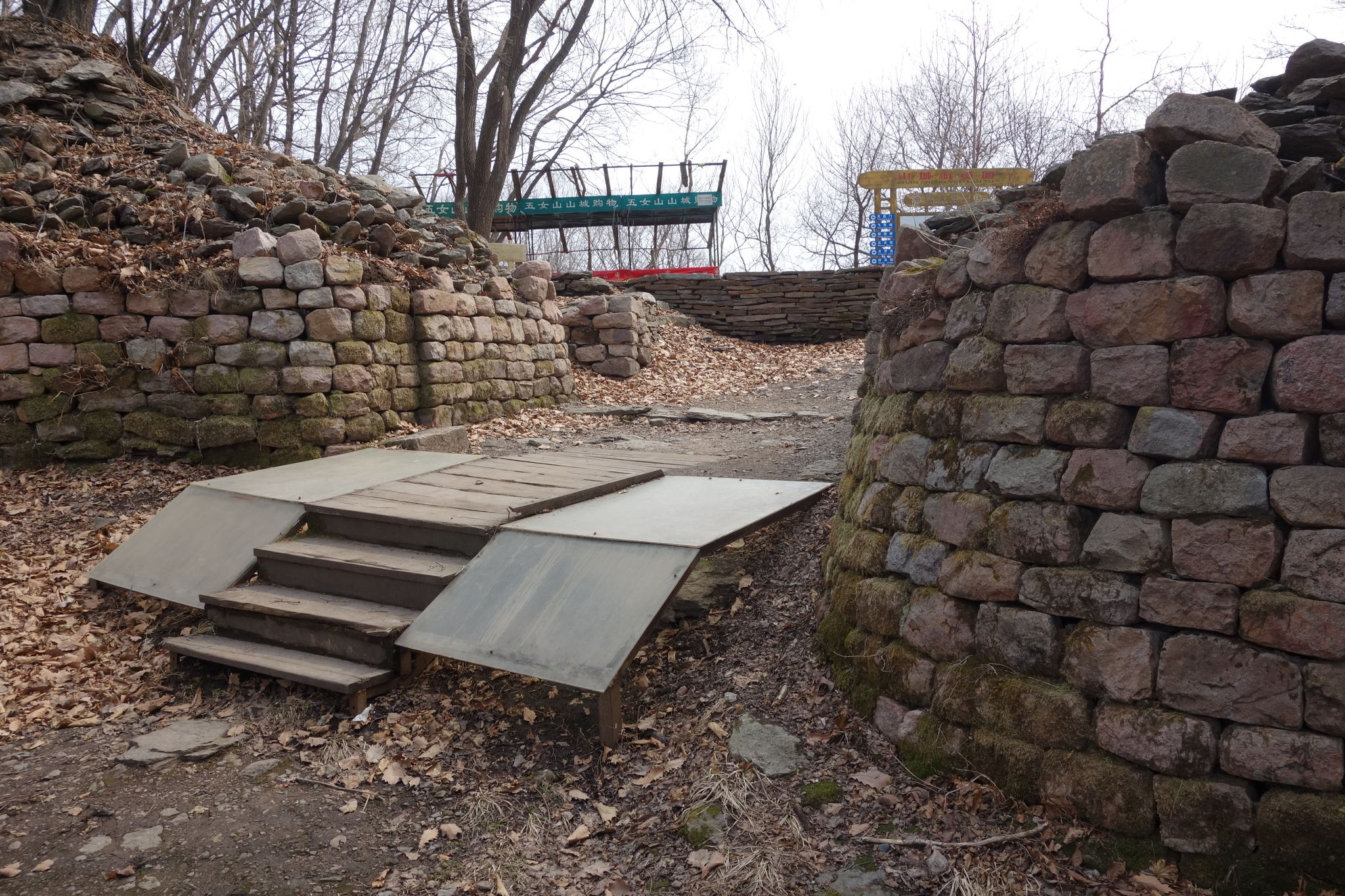
Goguryeo-era western gate of Wunü Mountain City

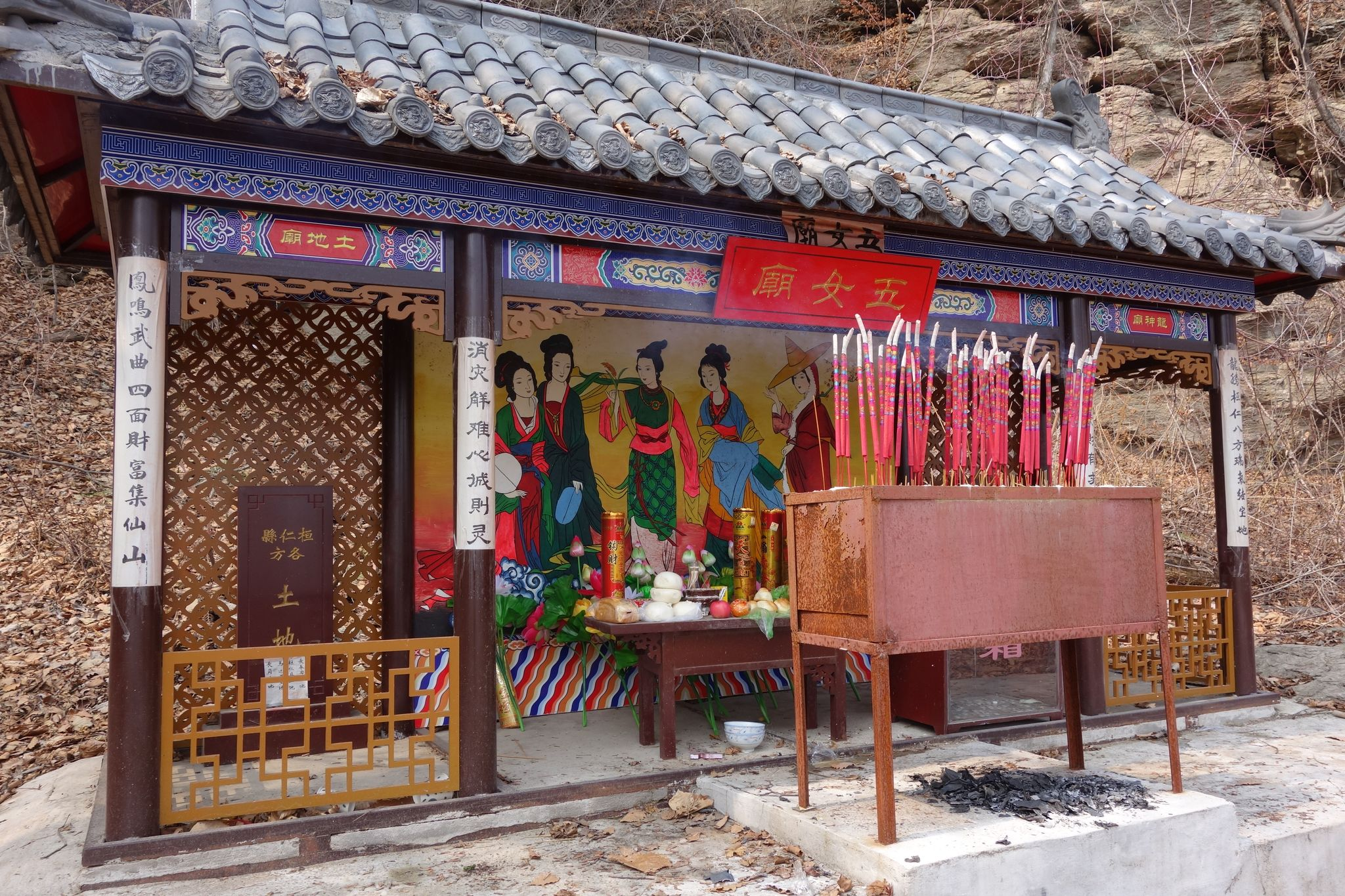
Shrine to the five women after whom Wunü Mountain is named

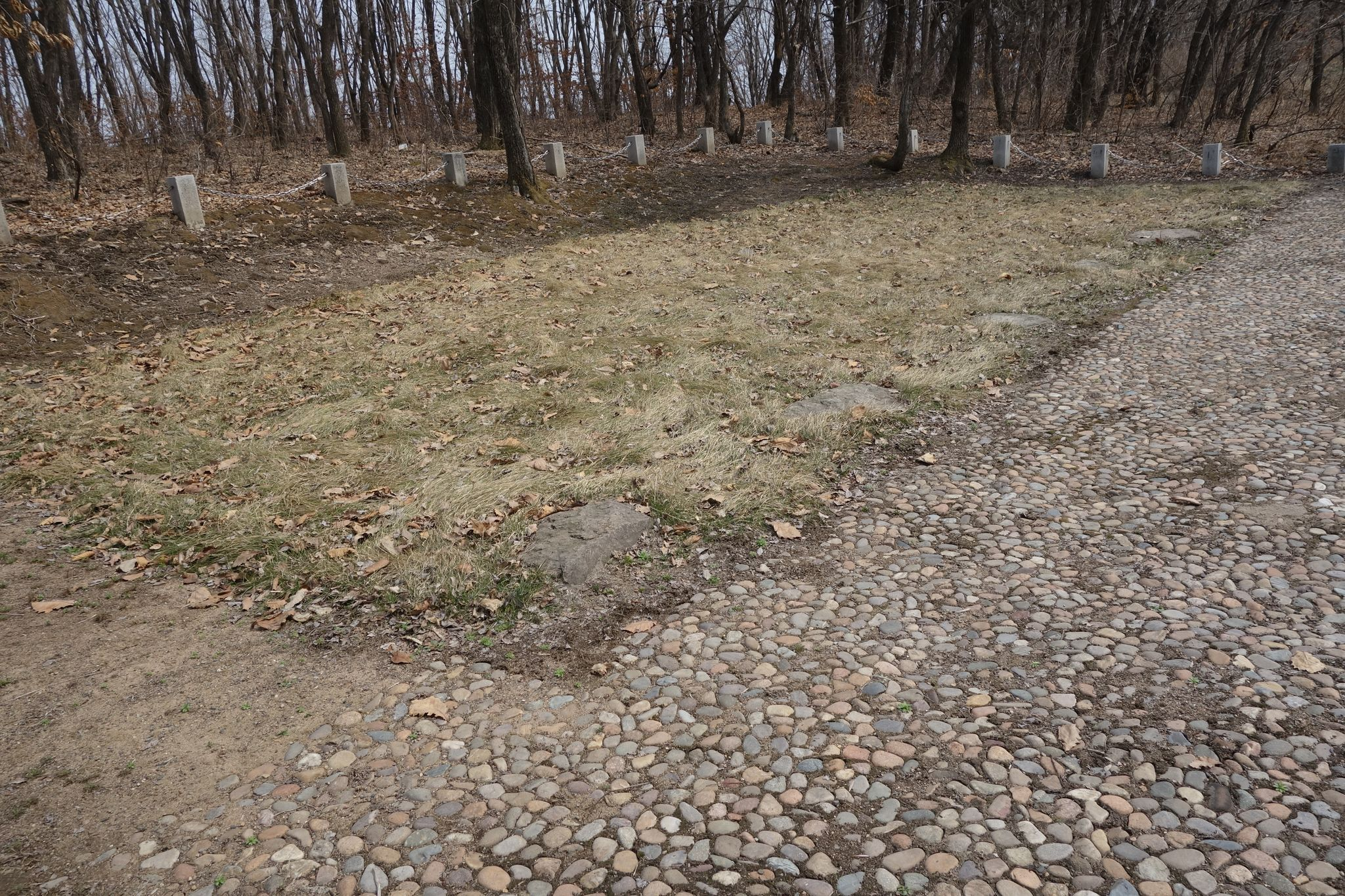
Remains of a Goguryeo-era building at Wunü Mountain City

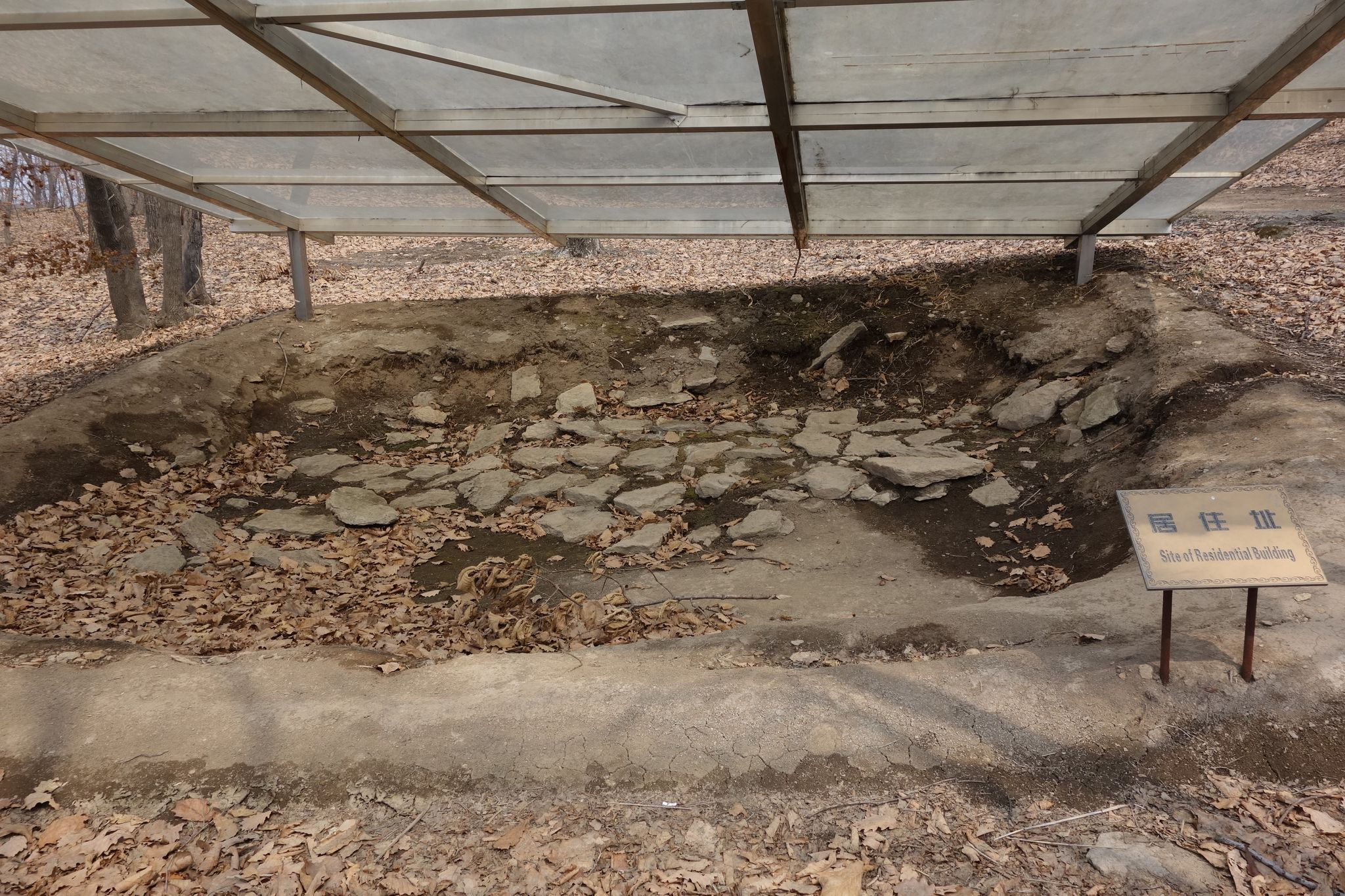
Remains of a Goguryeo-era residence at Wunü Mountain City

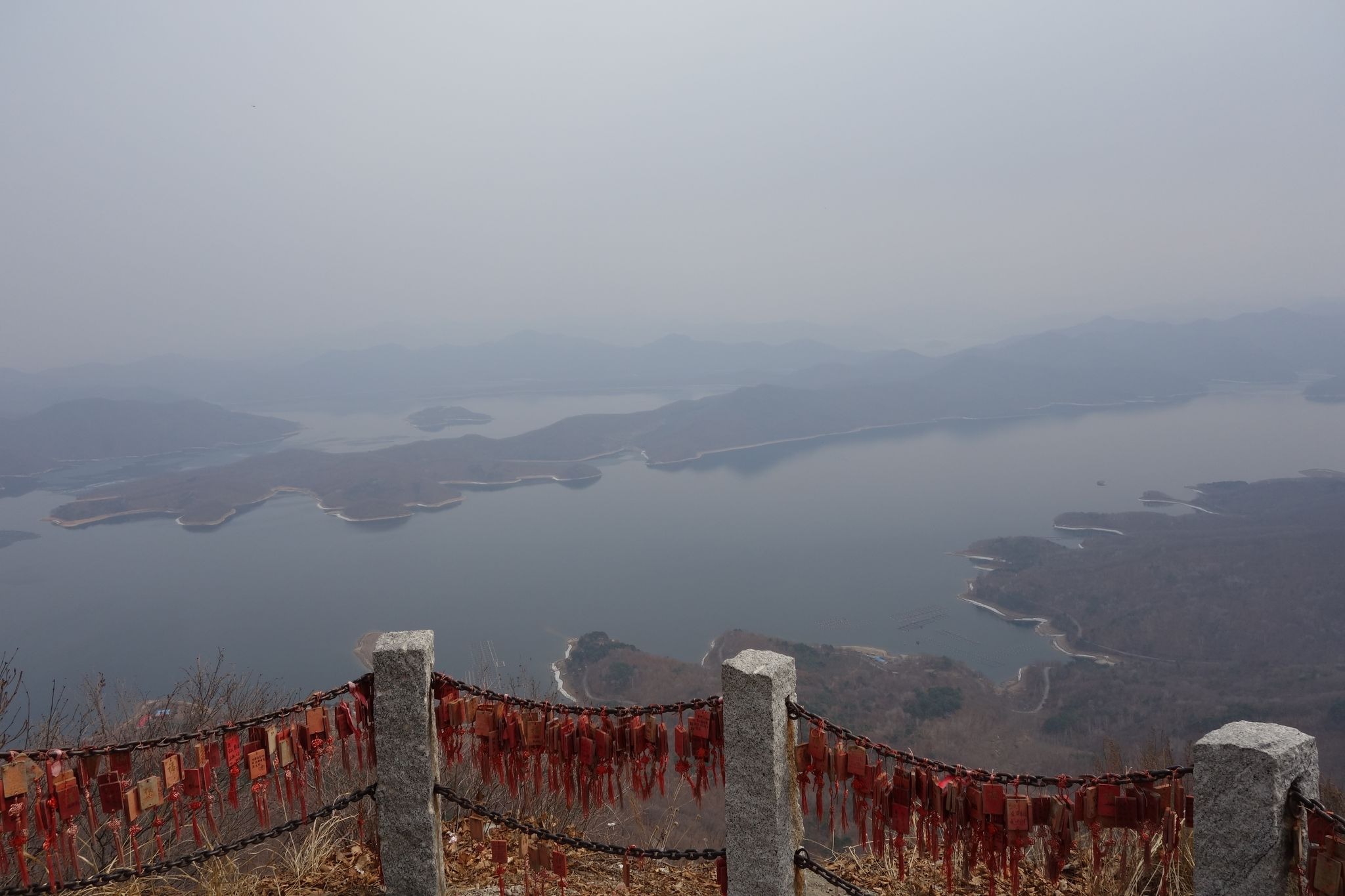
View of the vast reservoir neighboring Wunü Mountain

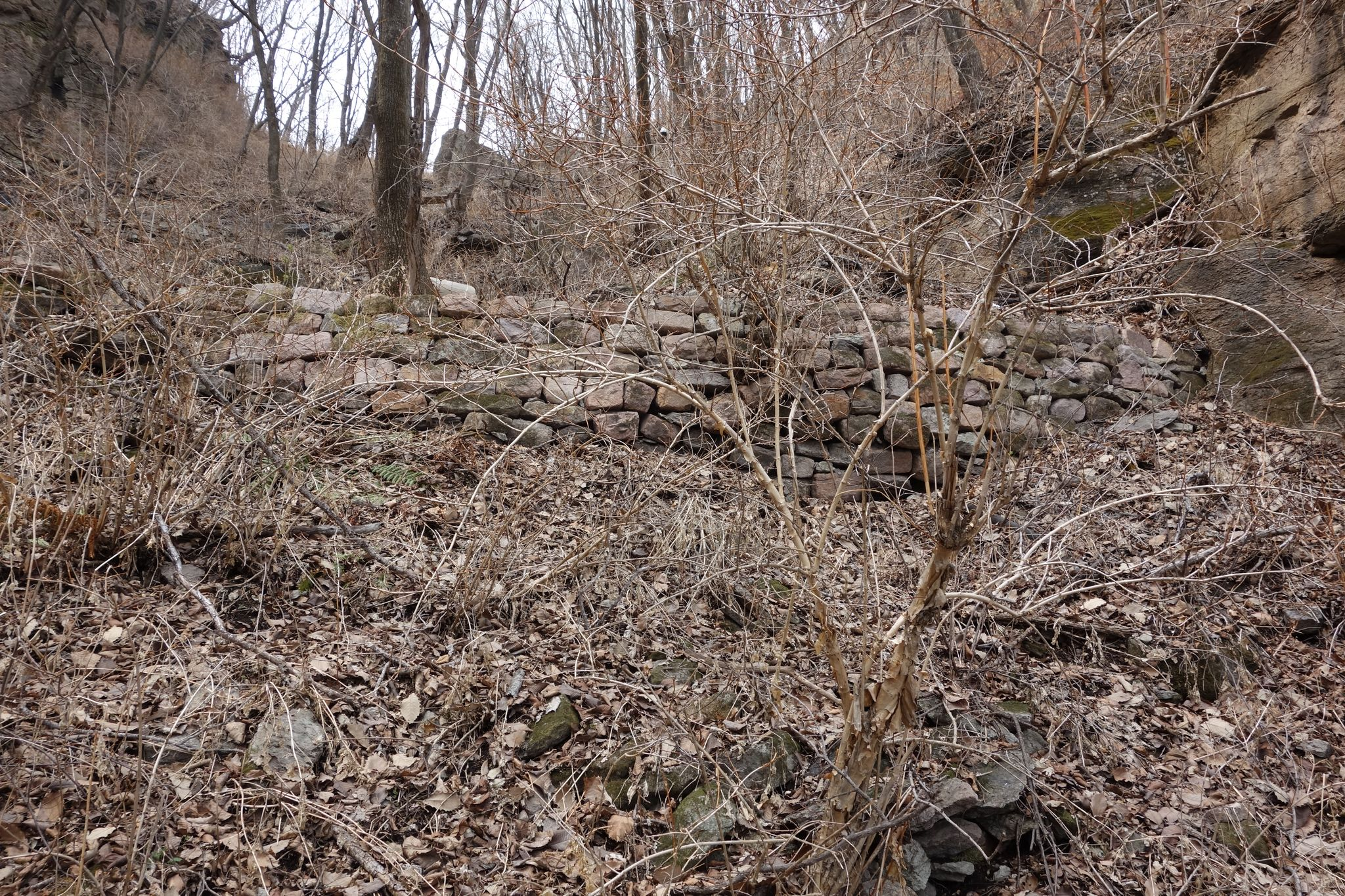
Goguryeo-era Wunü Mountain City wall

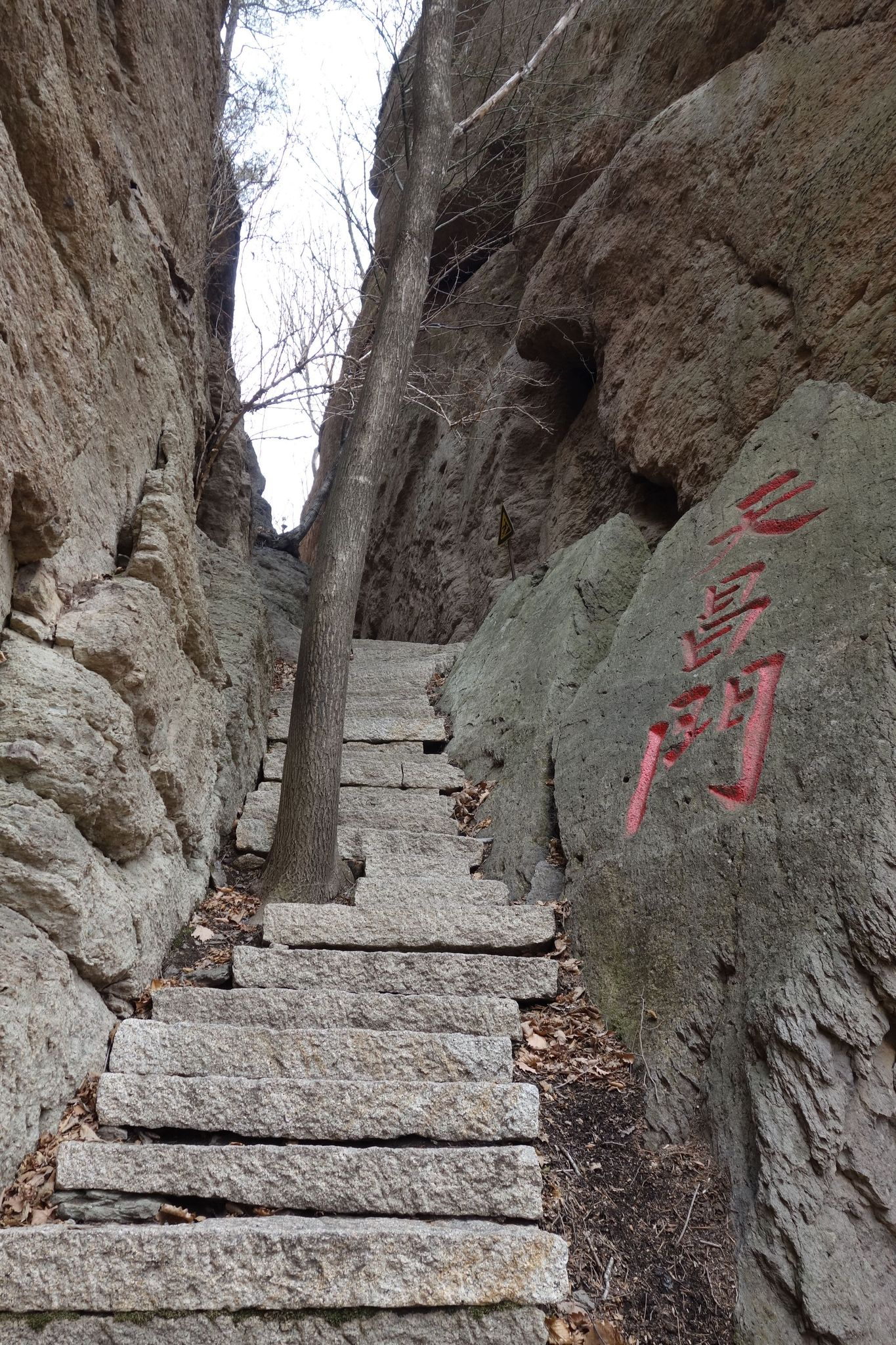
Wunü Mountain entrance through the narrow TianChang Gate

== See also ==
- Wunü Peaks National Forest Park
