= Capital Cities and Tombs of the Ancient Koguryo Kingdom =

UNESCO World Heritage Site in China

UNESCO World Heritage Site
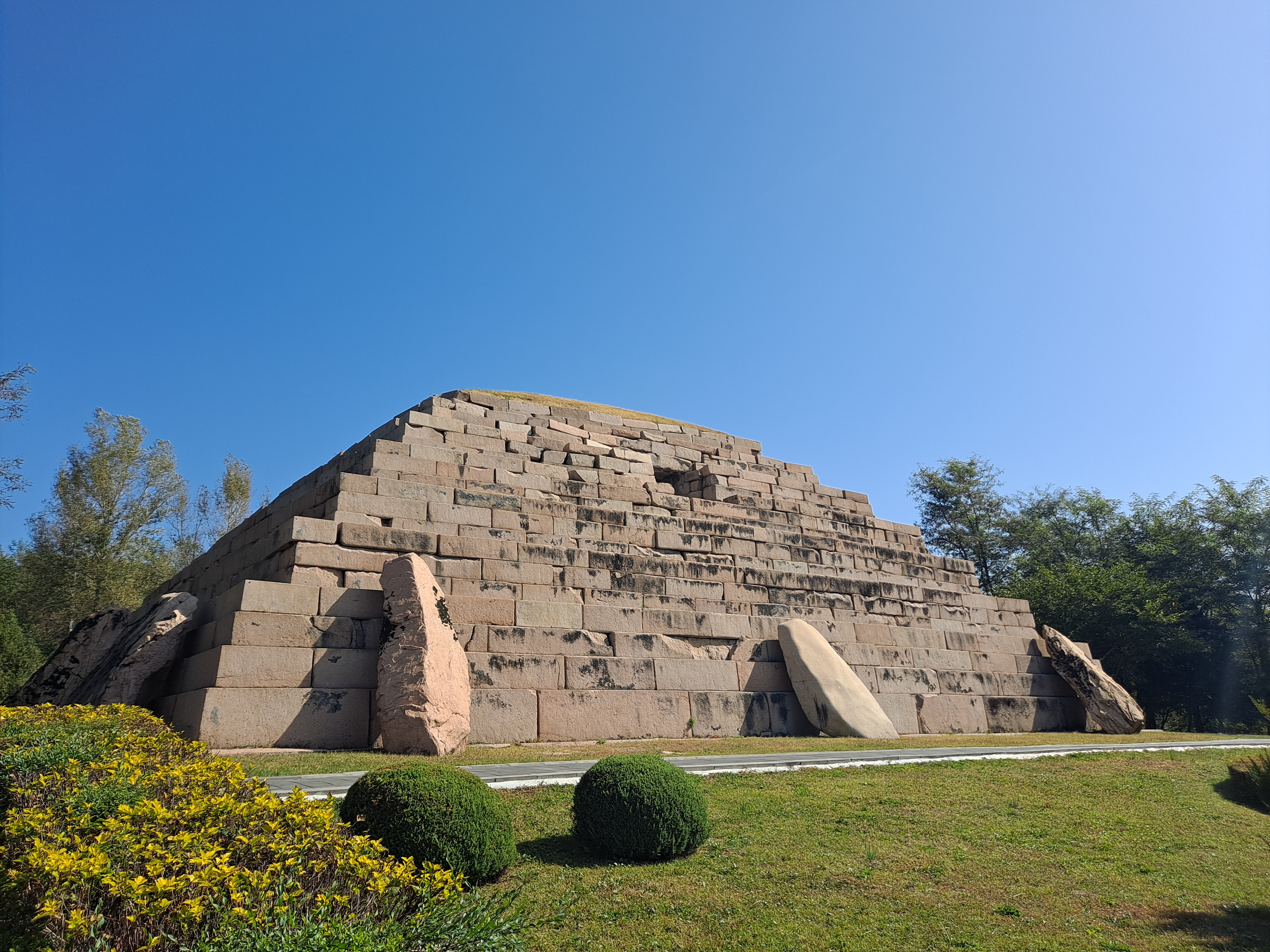
- Tomb of the General in Ji'an, Jilin

- Location within Jilin Location within China
- Location: Liaoning and Jilin in China
- Includes: Wunu Mountain City; Guonei City; Wandu Mountain City; Ranmou Tomb; Huanwen Tomb; Changchuan Tomb
- Criteria: Cultural: (i)(ii)(iii)(iv)(v)
- Reference: 1135
- Inscription: 2004 (28th Session)
- Area: 4,164.8599 ha (10,291.593 acres)
- Buffer zone: 14,142.4404 ha (34,946.731 acres)
- Coordinates: 41°09′25″N 126°11′14″E

The Capital Cities and Tombs of the Ancient Koguryo Kingdom is an UNESCO World Heritage Site which includes a number of archaeological sites currently in Ji'an, Jilin Province and Huanren, Liaoning Province in Northeast China. Goguryeo (or Koguryo, "Gaogouli" in Chinese), (37 BCE – 668 CE) was a Korean Kingdom located in the northern and central parts of the Korean Peninsula and the southern and central parts of Manchuria.

The archaeological sites were collectively designated a cultural World Heritage Site in 2004, qualifying as such under the first five of the six criteria for cultural heritage sites. The designation includes the archaeological remains of three fortress-cities: Wunü Mountain City, Gungnae and Hwando, and forty identified tombs of Goguryeo imperial and noble families.

In 2010, the Chinese government established the Ji'an Gaogouli National Archaeological Park (Chinese: 集安高句丽考古遗址公园), which includes all of the Goguryeo World Heritage Sites in Ji'an and Jilin, but not the ones in Liaoning (such as Wunü Mountain City).

North Korea initially attempted to register the world heritage of the sites from around 2000. Although it was scheduled to be registered in 2003, China opposed the sole registration of North Korea and applied for registration of the Goguryeo ruins scattered in Jilin Province. For this reason, the remains of North Korea and the People's Republic of China were registered in the form of simultaneous registration in 2004. It is recognized that there is an existence of a question on the history of Goguryeo between North Korea and China.

== Capital cities ==
Wunü Mountain City (Onyeosanseong) was the first capital of Goguryeo. Gungnae and Hwando were also capitals of Goguryeo.

Wunü Mountain City is only partly excavated. Gungnae City, within the modern city of Ji'an, played the role of a supporting capital after the main Goguryeo capital moved to Pyongyang. Hwando contains many vestiges including a large palace and many tombs.

The capital cities of the Goguryeo are an early example of mountain cities later imitated by neighbouring cultures. The system of capital cities represented by Gungnae City and Wandu Mountain City also influenced the construction of later capitals built by the Goguryeo regime.

The capital cities of the Goguryeo represent a perfect blending of human creation and nature whether with the rocks or with forests and rivers.

== Tombs ==
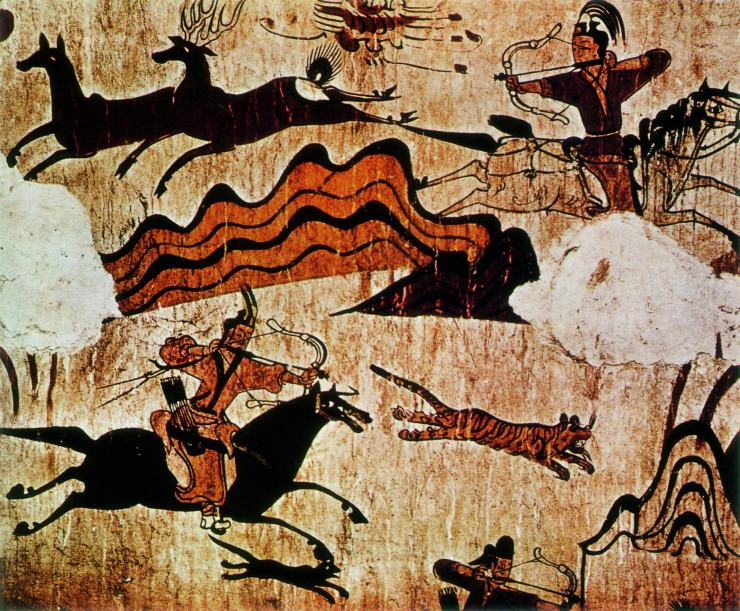
A Goguryeo tomb mural of hunting, middle of the first millennium.

The site includes archaeological remains of 40 tombs which were built by Goguryeo, which ruled over parts of northeast China and the northern half of the Korean Peninsula.

Some of the tombs have elaborate ceilings designed to roof wide spaces without columns and carry the heavy load of a stone or earth tumulus (mound) was placed above them. The paintings in the tombs, while showing artistic skills and specific style, are also an example of strong influence from various cultures.

The tombs represent a masterpiece of the human creative genius in their wall paintings and structures.

== See also ==
- Goguryeo tombs, UNESCO world heritage site in Pyongyang, North Korea.
- Ancient Tombs at Longtou Mountain with Mausoleum of Princess Jeonghyo of Balhae.
