= Hwando =

Hwando Mountain City
UNESCO World Heritage Site
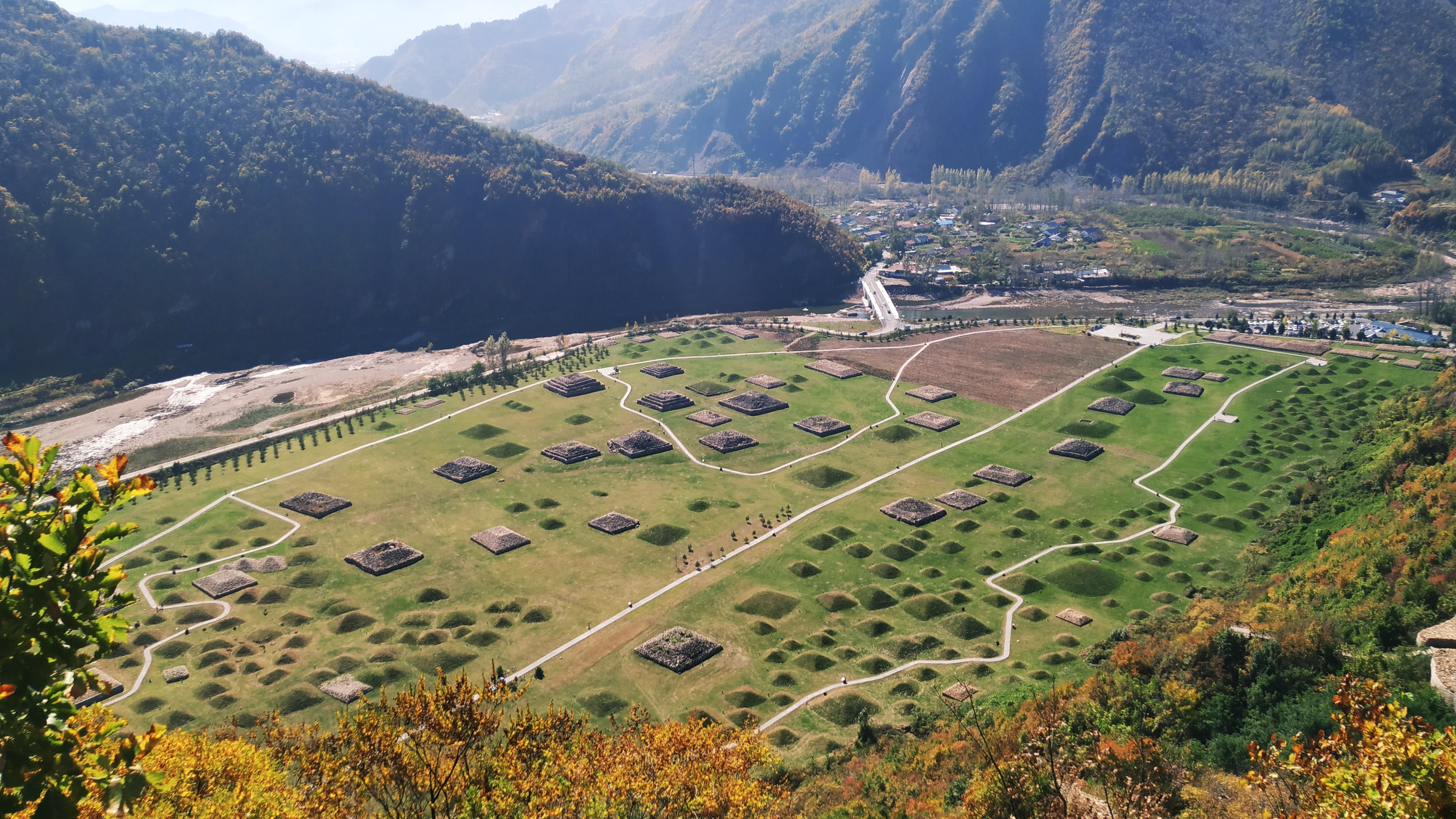
- Overlook of aristocrat tombs in Hwando Mountain City

- Location within Jilin Location within China
- Location: Ji'an, Jilin, China
- Part of: Capital Cities and Tombs of the Ancient Koguryo Kingdom
- Criteria: Cultural: (i)(ii)(iii)(iv)(v)
- Reference: 1135-003
- Inscription: 2004 (28th Session)
- Area: 3,219.21 ha (7,954.8 acres)
- Coordinates: 41°8′47.5″N 126°9′47.5″E

Chinese name
- Chinese: 丸都山城
Transcriptions
Standard Mandarin
- Hanyu Pinyin: Wándū Shān Chéng
- Wade–Giles: Wan-tu Shan Ch'eng

Korean name
- Hangul: 위나산성
- Hanja: 尉那山城
Transcriptions
- Revised Romanization: Winasanseong
- McCune–Reischauer: Winasansŏng

Hwando (Chinese: 丸都; pinyin: Wandu) is a mountain fortress of the ancient Korean kingdom of Goguryeo, built to protect Goguryeo's second capital, Gungnae. It is located in present-day Ji'an city of the province of Jilin, China.

The fortress is located 2.5 km west of Ji'an, Jilin province in Northeast China, near the North Korean border. It is part of the UNESCO World Heritage Site Capital Cities and Tombs of the Ancient Koguryo Kingdom, together with nearby Gungnae City and the Ohnyeosan City, because of its historical importance and exceptional architecture.

== History ==
In 3 CE, King Yuri of Goguryeo moved the capital to Gungnae Fortress, and built the Wina Rock fortress. Gungnae Fortress, the capital, was a fortress on Amnok River's plain, while "Wina Rocks fortress" (위나암성; 尉那巖城) was a fortified city in the mountain which was later renamed to Hwando by King Sansang of Goguryeo.

Goguryeo consolidated its power and began to threaten the Chinese commanderies, under the nominal control of Wei. In 242, Dongcheon attacked a Chinese fortress near the mouth of the Amnok River leading to the Goguryeo–Wei War; in 244, Wei invaded Goguryeo and sacked Hwando.

Goguryeo ended China's presence on the Korean peninsula by conquering the Lelang commandery in 313. However, Goguryeo faced opposition by the proto-Mongol Xianbei who had conquered northern China; the Murong clan of the Xianbei attacked Goguryeo and sacked Hwando in 341, capturing thousands of prisoners to provide cheap labor. The Xianbei also devastated Buyeo in 346, accelerating Buyeo migration to the Korean peninsula. Goguryeo, though temporarily weakened, would soon recoup and continue its expansion.

== Gallery ==
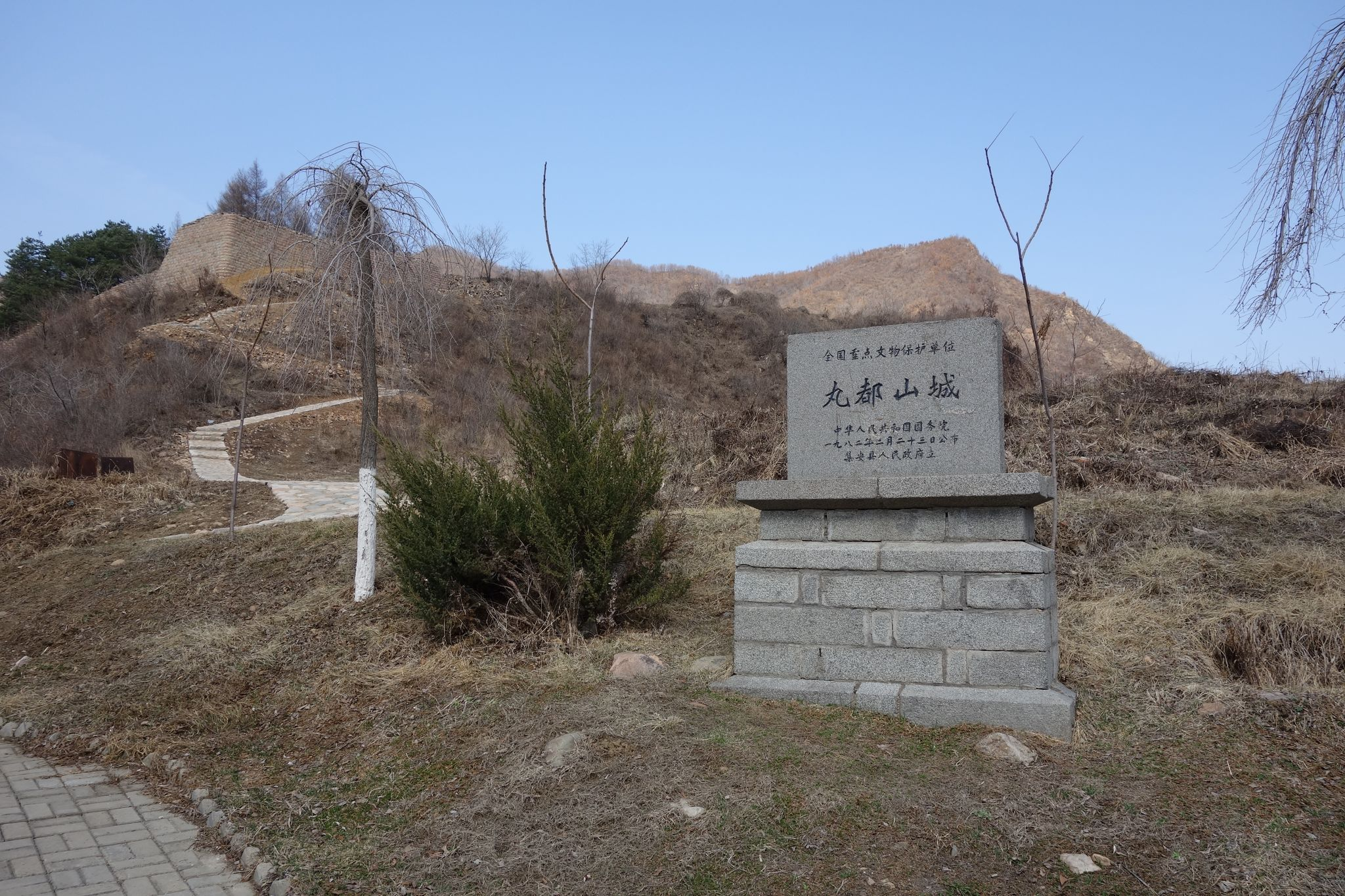
Entrance plaque

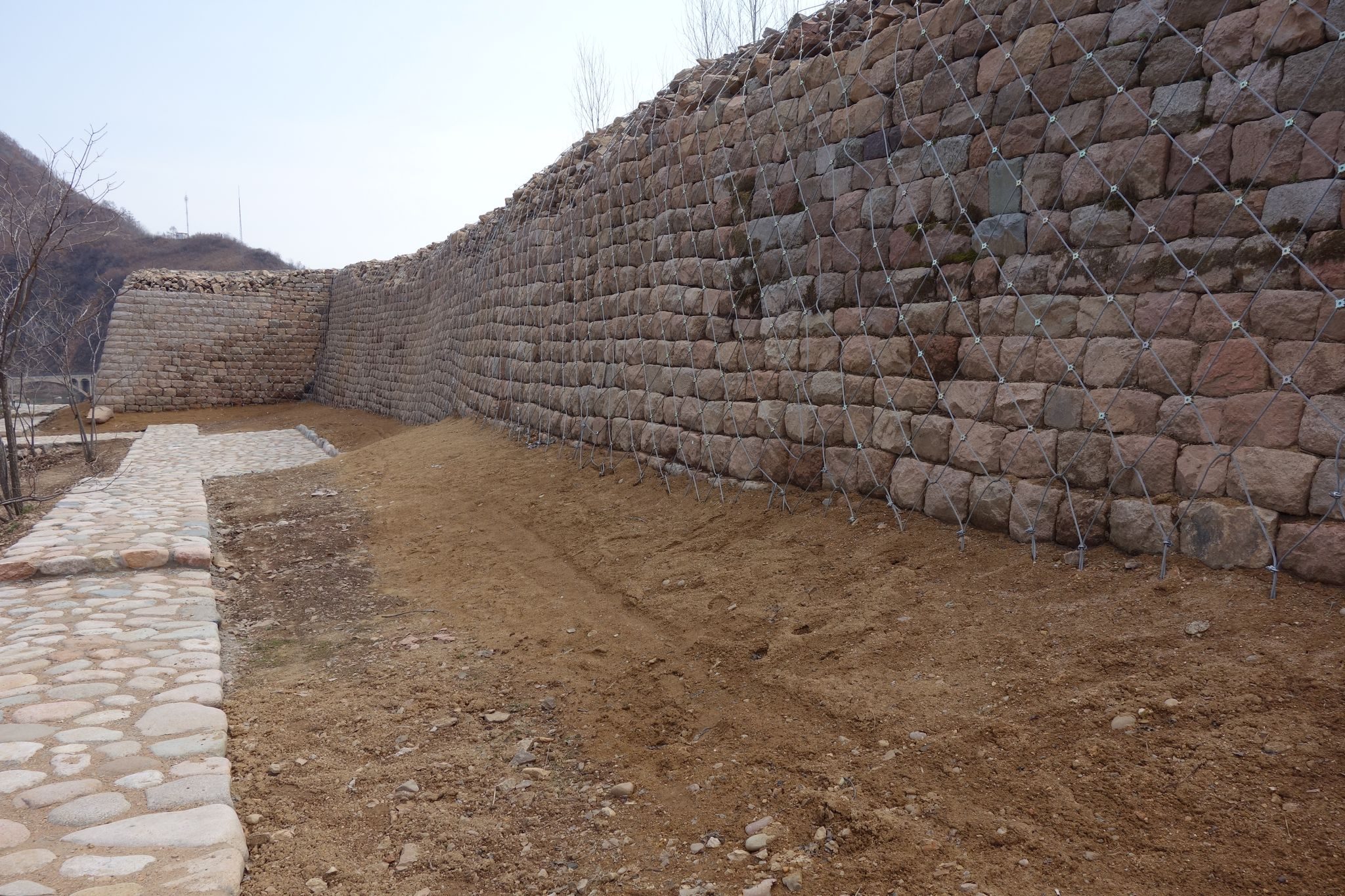
Detail of a wall

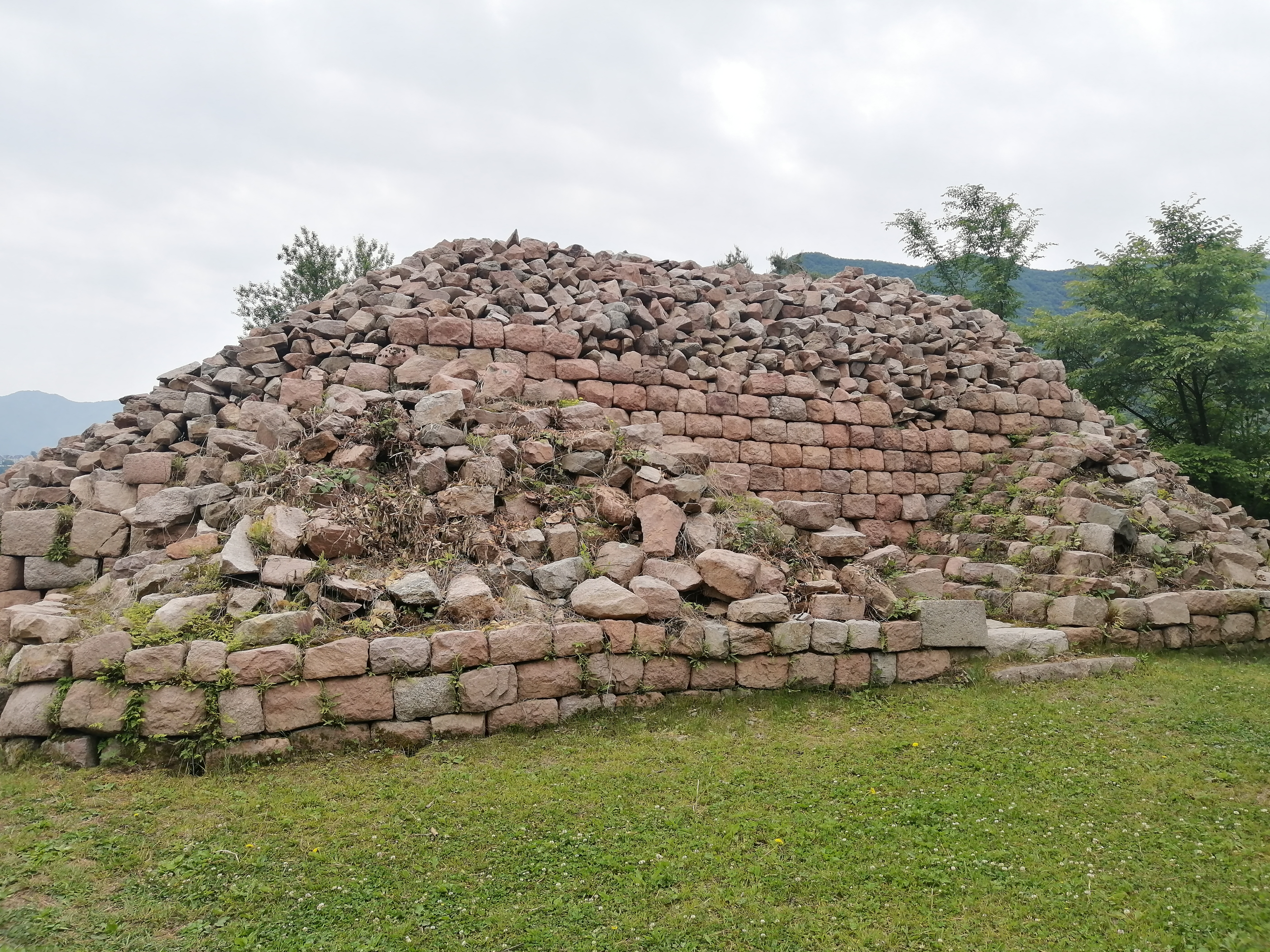
Remains of a guard tower

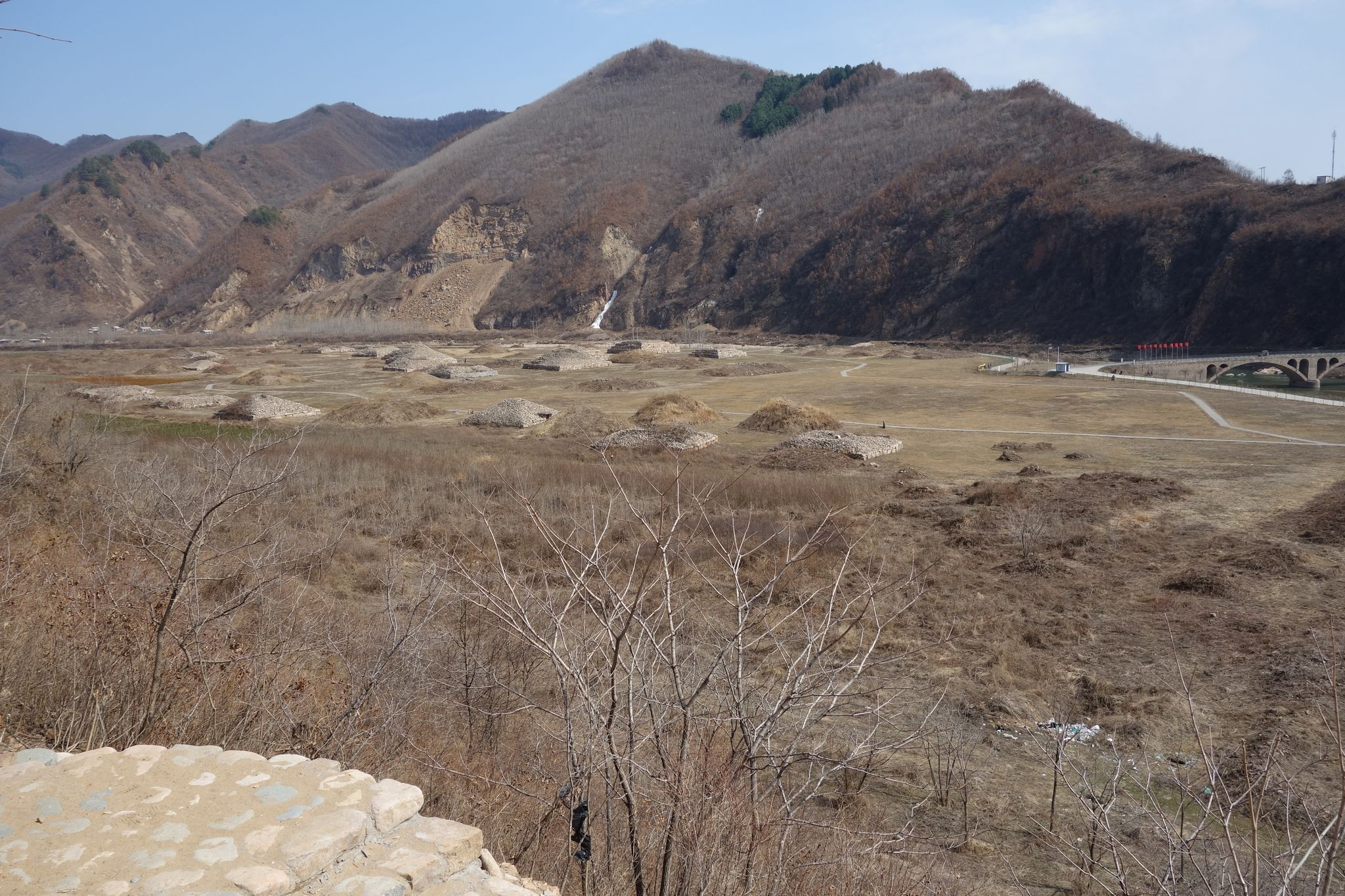
Goguryeo tombs near Hwando
