= Gungnae =

Second capital of Goguryeo

Guonei City
UNESCO World Heritage Site
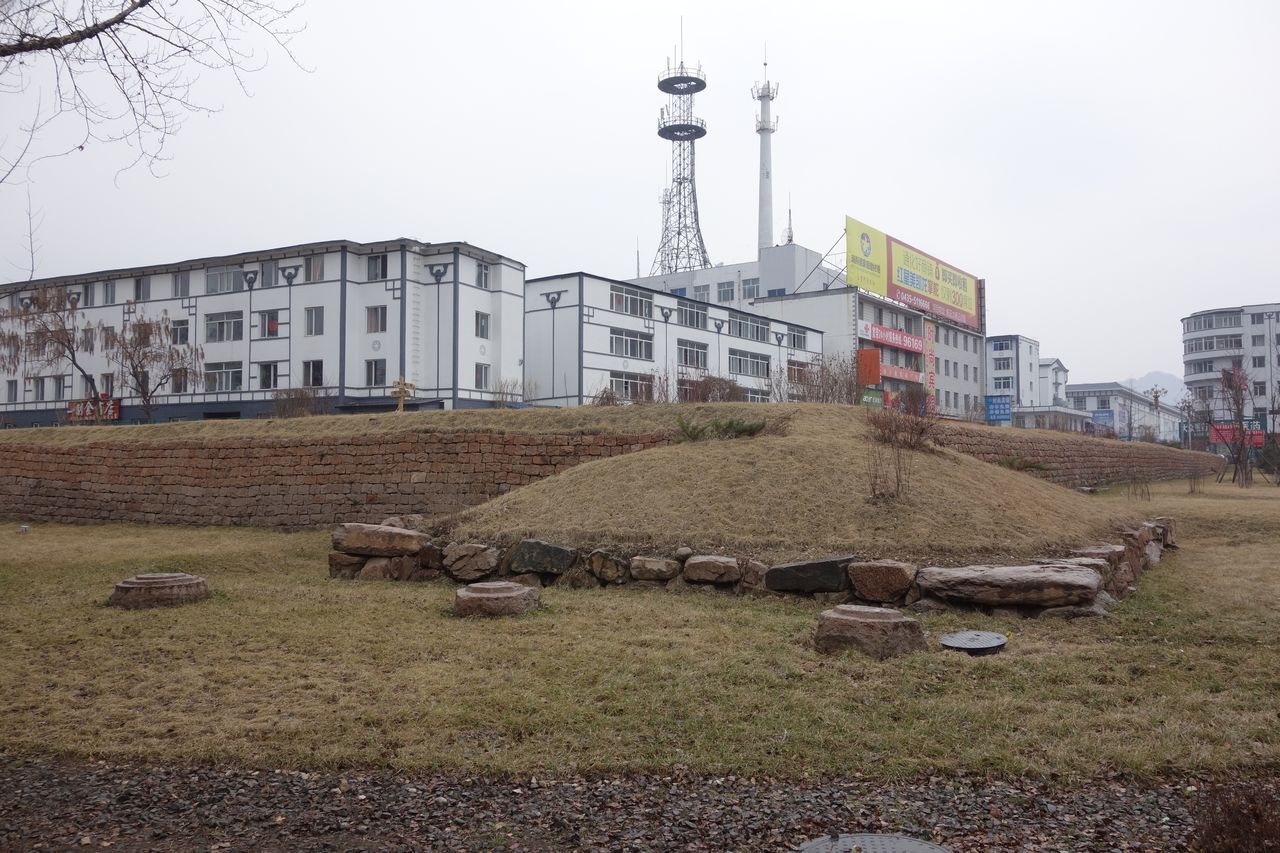
- Gungnae

- Location within Jilin Location within China
- Location: Ji'an, Jilin, China
- Part of: Capital Cities and Tombs of the Ancient Koguryo Kingdom
- Criteria: Cultural: (i)(ii)(iii)(iv)(v)
- Reference: 1135
- Inscription: 2004 (28th Session)
- Area: 59.24 ha (146.4 acres)
- Coordinates: 41°7′15″N 126°10′43″E

Chinese name
- Traditional Chinese: 國內城
- Simplified Chinese: 国内城
Transcriptions
Standard Mandarin
- Hanyu Pinyin: Gúonèi Chéng
- Wade–Giles: Kuo-Nei Ch'eng

Korean name
- Hangul: 국내성
- Hanja: 國內城
Transcriptions
- Revised Romanization: Gungnaeseong
- McCune–Reischauer: Kungnaesŏng

Gungnaeseong (Korean: 국내성; Hanja: 國內城) or Guonei (Chinese: 國內) was the capital of the ancient Korean kingdom of Goguryeo, which was located in Manchuria and the Korean Peninsula. The perimeter of its outer fortress measures 2,686m. It is located in present day Ji'an city, Jilin province, northeast China. Because of its historical importance and exceptional architecture, Gungnae was designated as a UNESCO World Heritage Site in 2004. It is part of the Capital Cities and Tombs of the Ancient Koguryo Kingdom World Heritage Site, together with nearby Hwando Mountain City and the Onyeosan City, in modern northeast China.

== History ==
Gungnae was chosen to become the capital city by the ruler, Yuri during the 10th month of the year 3 AD. The city was sacked several times until the rise of the 19th ruler, Gwanggaeto the Great, who greatly expanded Goguryeo's territory and made it a formidable power in northeast Asia. When King Gwanggaeto died in 413, his son, Jangsu of Goguryeo, inherited the throne and moved the capital down to Pyongyang in 427. The city played a central role of the kingdom after the power transfer.

Just before the fall of Goguryeo, Gungnae City fell to the Silla-Tang Chinese alliance when General Yŏn Namsaeng, son of Yŏn Kaesomun, surrendered the city in 666. Goguryeo fell in 668 when the Tang army captured Pyongyang and took King Bojang and Yŏn Namgŏn into custody.

== Gallery ==
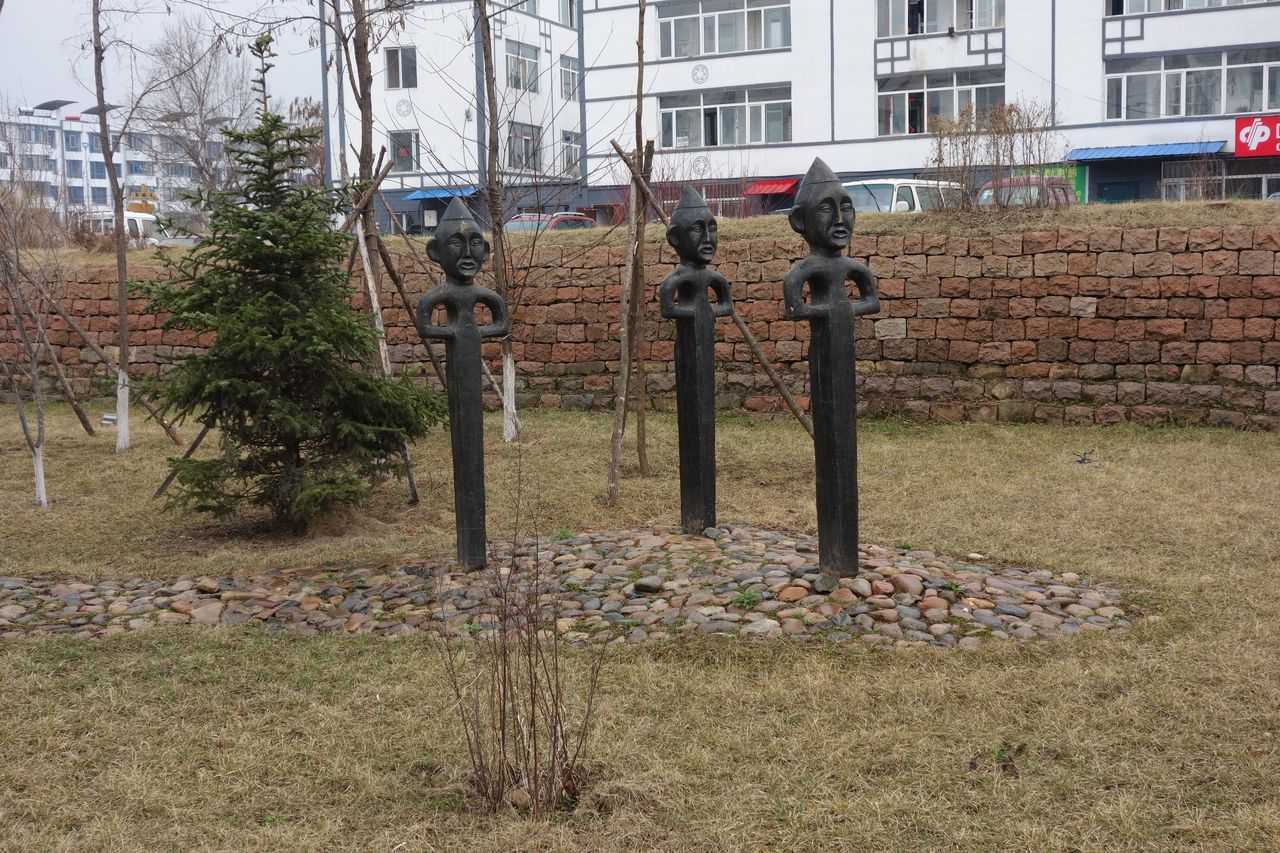
Modern statues in the ruins

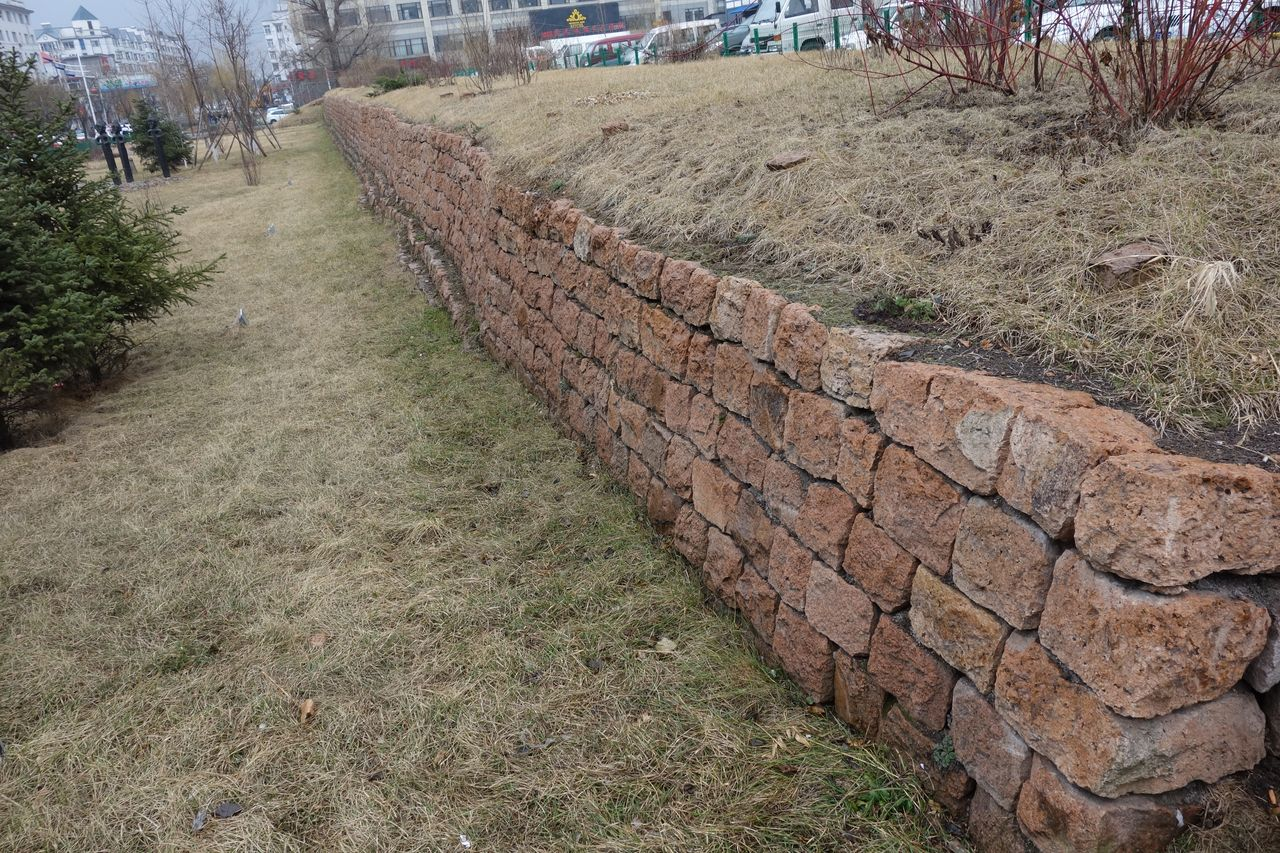
City wall

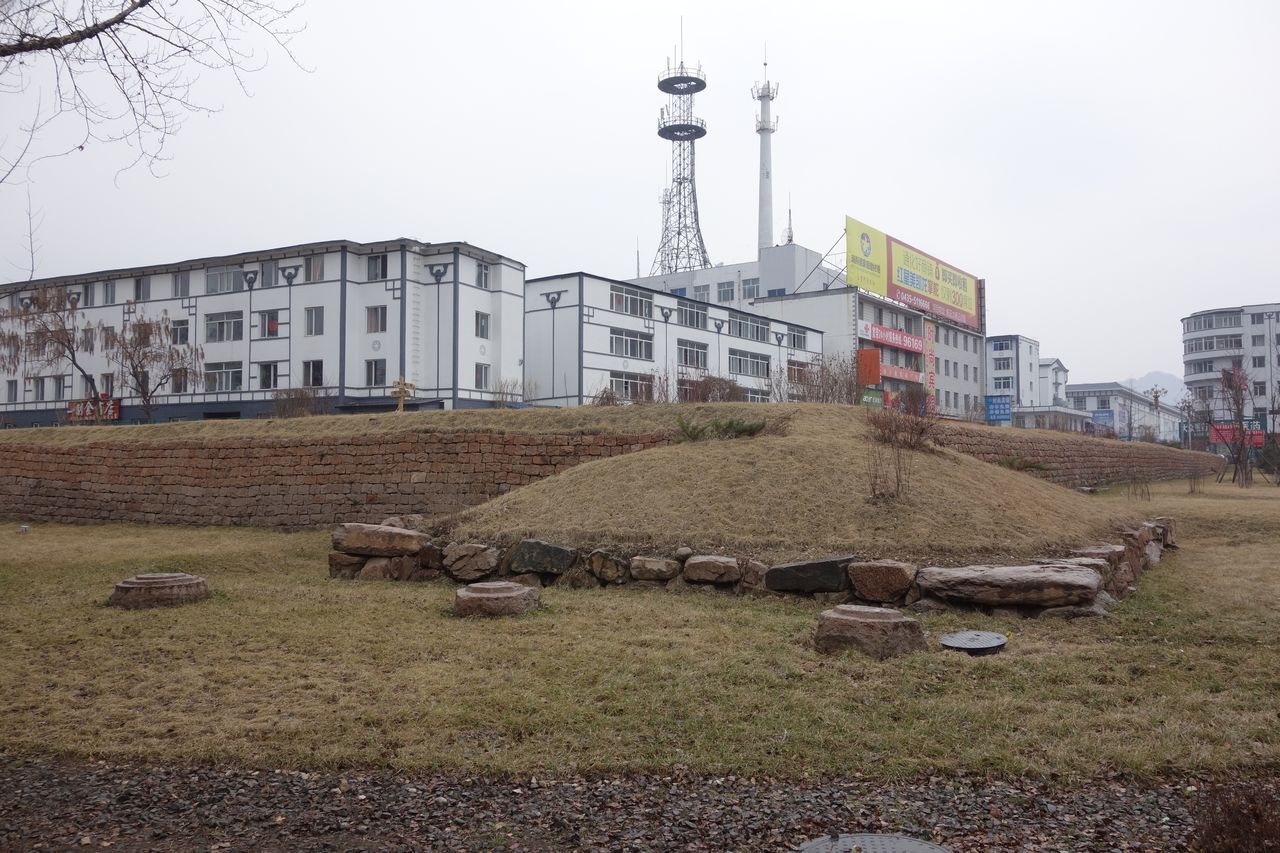
A corner of the ruins
