= Ji'an, Jilin =

Ji'an 集安市
- County-level city
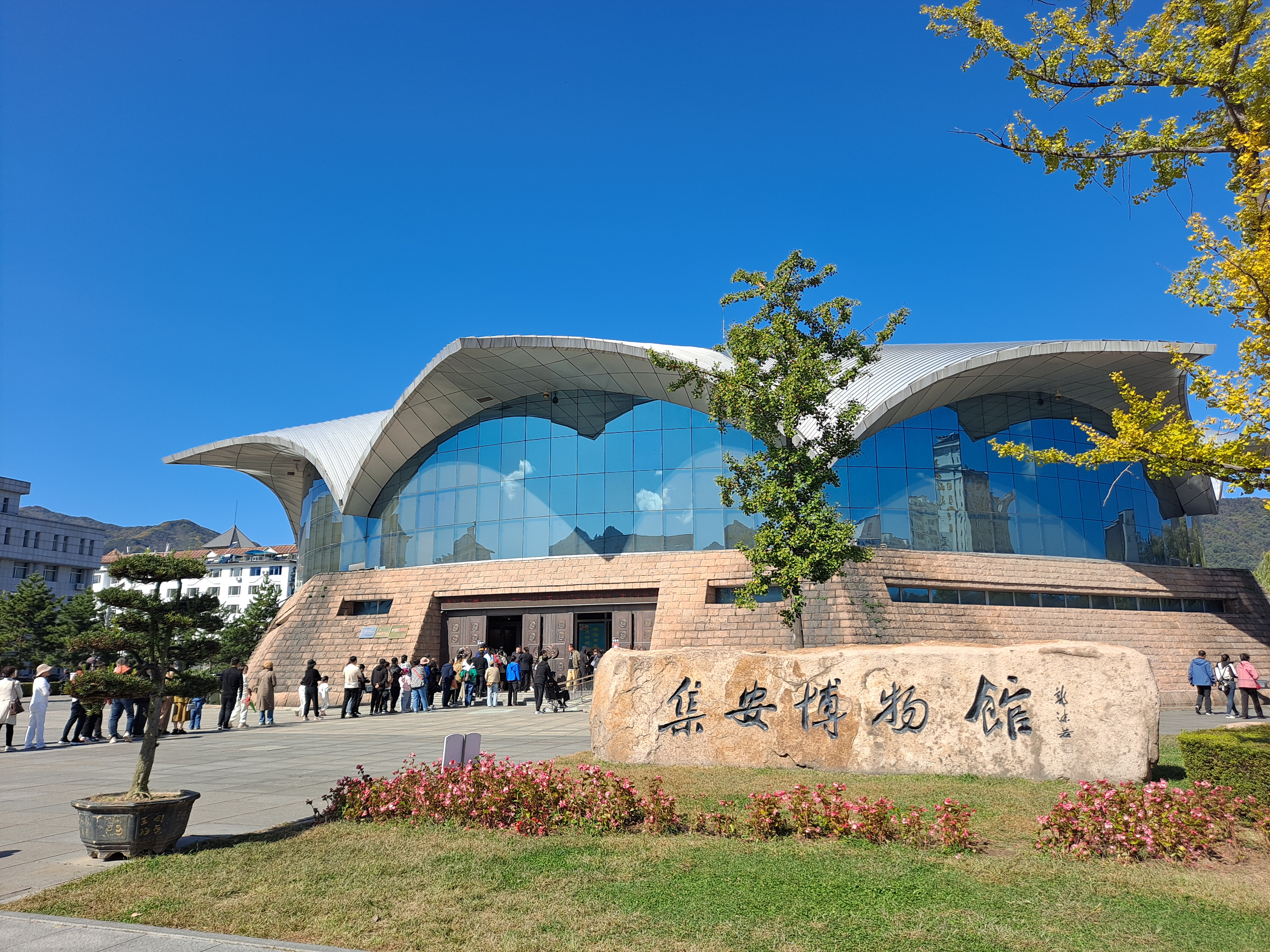
- Downtown area in Ji'an

- Ji'an (red) in Tonghua (white)

- Location of Ji'an city center in Jilin
- Coordinates: 41°07′31″N 126°11′38″E
- Country: People's Republic of China
- Province: Jilin
- Prefecture-level city: Tonghua
- County-level city established: 1988

Area
  - County-level city: 3,341.1 km^{2} (1,290.0 sq mi)
  - Urban: 44.89 km^{2} (17.33 sq mi)
- Elevation: 180 m (590 ft)

Population (2017)
  - County-level city: 214,000
  - Density: 64.1/km^{2} (166/sq mi)
  - Urban: 79,000
- Time zone: UTC+8 (China Standard)
- Postal code: 134200

Ji'an (Chinese: 集安; pinyin: Jí'ān; formerly simplified Chinese: 辑安; traditional Chinese: 輯安; pinyin: Jí'ān) is a county-level city in the southwestern part of Jilin province, People's Republic of China. It is administered by the prefecture-level city of Tonghua and is the southernmost county-level division in the province. Ji'an has an area of 3,408 km^{2} (1,316 sq mi) and a population of approximately 230,000. The city was given its current status in 1988. Ji'an is separated from Manpo, Chagang Province, North Korea by the Yalu River; it has an international border running 203.5 km (126.4 mi).

== History ==
Archaeological excavations in the Ji'an area have unearthed several Yemaek sites along the Amnok River and its tributary the Hunjiang, which belong to the regional Neolithic and Bronze ages.

After the fall of Wiman Joseon to the Han dynasty in 108 BCE, Ji'an was part of Goguryeo County under the administration of Xuantu Commandery. In 3 CE, the second ruler of Goguryeo, King Yuri, moved the state's capital to Gungnae (modern Ji'an) and established the mountain fortress Hwando nearby to defend it. Hwando was sacked by Wei State in 244 CE during the Goguryeo–Wei War. In 342 CE, Hwando was destroyed and thousands of people captured by the Murong Xianbei, after which Goguryeo focussed on expanding south and east. In 427 CE, the eleventh ruler of Goguryeo, King Jangsu, moved the capital to Pyongyang, which saw Gungnae relegated to subsidiary capital status.

The Capital Cities and Tombs of the Ancient Koguryo Kingdom, located in Ji'an and Huanren Manchu Autonomous County, Liaoning, have been listed as part of a UNESCO World Heritage Site. Ji'an is also dubbed as a "Little Jiangnan" of Jilin due to its scenery.

== Geography and climate ==
Ji'an has a monsoon-influenced humid continental climate (Köppen Dwa), with long, very cold winters, and very warm, humid summers. Monthly average temperatures range from −12.1 °C (10.2 °F) in January to 23.3 °C (73.9 °F) in July, and the annual mean is 7.5 °C (45.5 °F). Though the annual total, at 917.7 mm (36.1 in), is generous, precipitation is quite low during the winter and upwards of 60% of annual rainfall occurs from June through August. The frost-free period lasts around 150 days.

Climate data for Ji'an, elevation 225 m (738 ft), (1991–2020 normals, extremes 1971–2025)
Month	Jan	Feb	Mar	Apr	May	Jun	Jul	Aug	Sep	Oct	Nov	Dec	Year
Record high °C (°F)	6.8 (44.2)	14.0 (57.2)	24.6 (76.3)	30.4 (86.7)	34.5 (94.1)	36.5 (97.7)	37.7 (99.9)	37.2 (99.0)	33.0 (91.4)	27.5 (81.5)	20.4 (68.7)	9.9 (49.8)	37.7 (99.9)
Mean daily maximum °C (°F)	−4.6 (23.7)	0.2 (32.4)	7.5 (45.5)	16.8 (62.2)	23.2 (73.8)	27.0 (80.6)	29.2 (84.6)	28.6 (83.5)	24.0 (75.2)	16.4 (61.5)	5.6 (42.1)	−3.0 (26.6)	14.2 (57.6)
Daily mean °C (°F)	−11.5 (11.3)	−6.7 (19.9)	1.0 (33.8)	9.5 (49.1)	15.9 (60.6)	20.4 (68.7)	23.7 (74.7)	22.8 (73.0)	16.8 (62.2)	9.0 (48.2)	0.0 (32.0)	−8.8 (16.2)	7.7 (45.8)
Mean daily minimum °C (°F)	−16.6 (2.1)	−12.3 (9.9)	−4.4 (24.1)	2.9 (37.2)	9.4 (48.9)	15.0 (59.0)	19.5 (67.1)	18.7 (65.7)	11.7 (53.1)	3.3 (37.9)	−4.3 (24.3)	−13.3 (8.1)	2.5 (36.5)
Record low °C (°F)	−29.7 (−21.5)	−28.2 (−18.8)	−26.0 (−14.8)	−7.7 (18.1)	−2.2 (28.0)	6.9 (44.4)	10.9 (51.6)	6.4 (43.5)	−0.5 (31.1)	−7.8 (18.0)	−20.0 (−4.0)	−28.2 (−18.8)	−29.7 (−21.5)
Average precipitation mm (inches)	9.9 (0.39)	16.1 (0.63)	26.4 (1.04)	47.8 (1.88)	80.5 (3.17)	109.1 (4.30)	231.3 (9.11)	206.9 (8.15)	76.0 (2.99)	48.4 (1.91)	42.0 (1.65)	17.7 (0.70)	912.1 (35.92)
Average precipitation days (≥ 0.1 mm)	6.8	5.9	7.5	9.5	13.1	14.8	16.6	14.5	8.6	8.6	9.4	8.4	123.7
Average snowy days	8.7	7.2	6.8	2.2	0	0	0	0	0	0.7	7.1	10.3	43
Average relative humidity (%)	68	63	58	55	63	73	80	82	78	70	70	71	69
Mean monthly sunshine hours	167.0	179.7	211.6	205.2	229.5	206.2	183.0	187.3	197.3	189.8	137.0	139.2	2,232.8
Percentage possible sunshine	56	59	57	51	51	46	40	44	53	56	47	49	51
Source 1: China Meteorological Administration
Source 2: Weather China

== Gallery ==
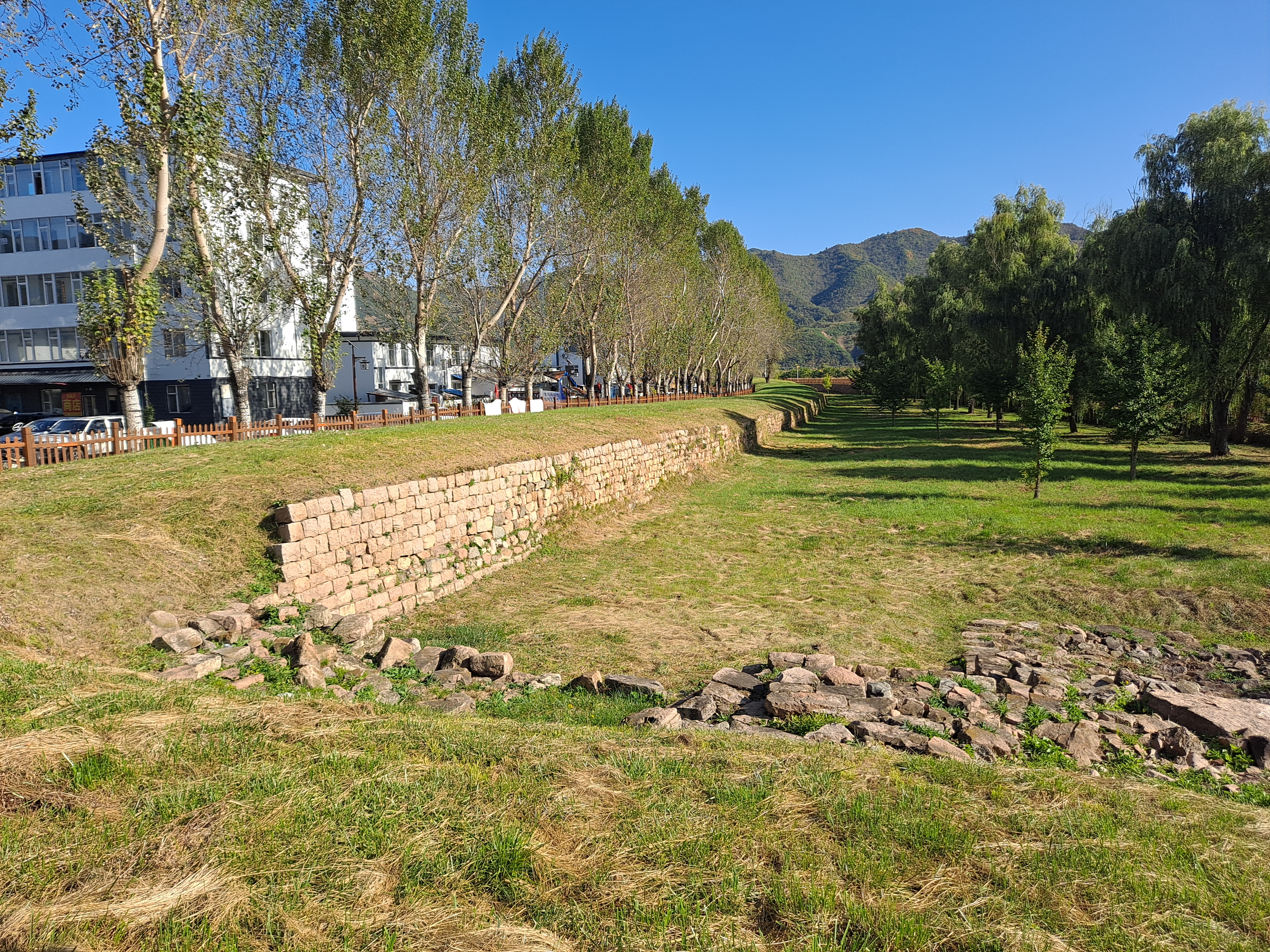
Ruins of Gungnae city wall

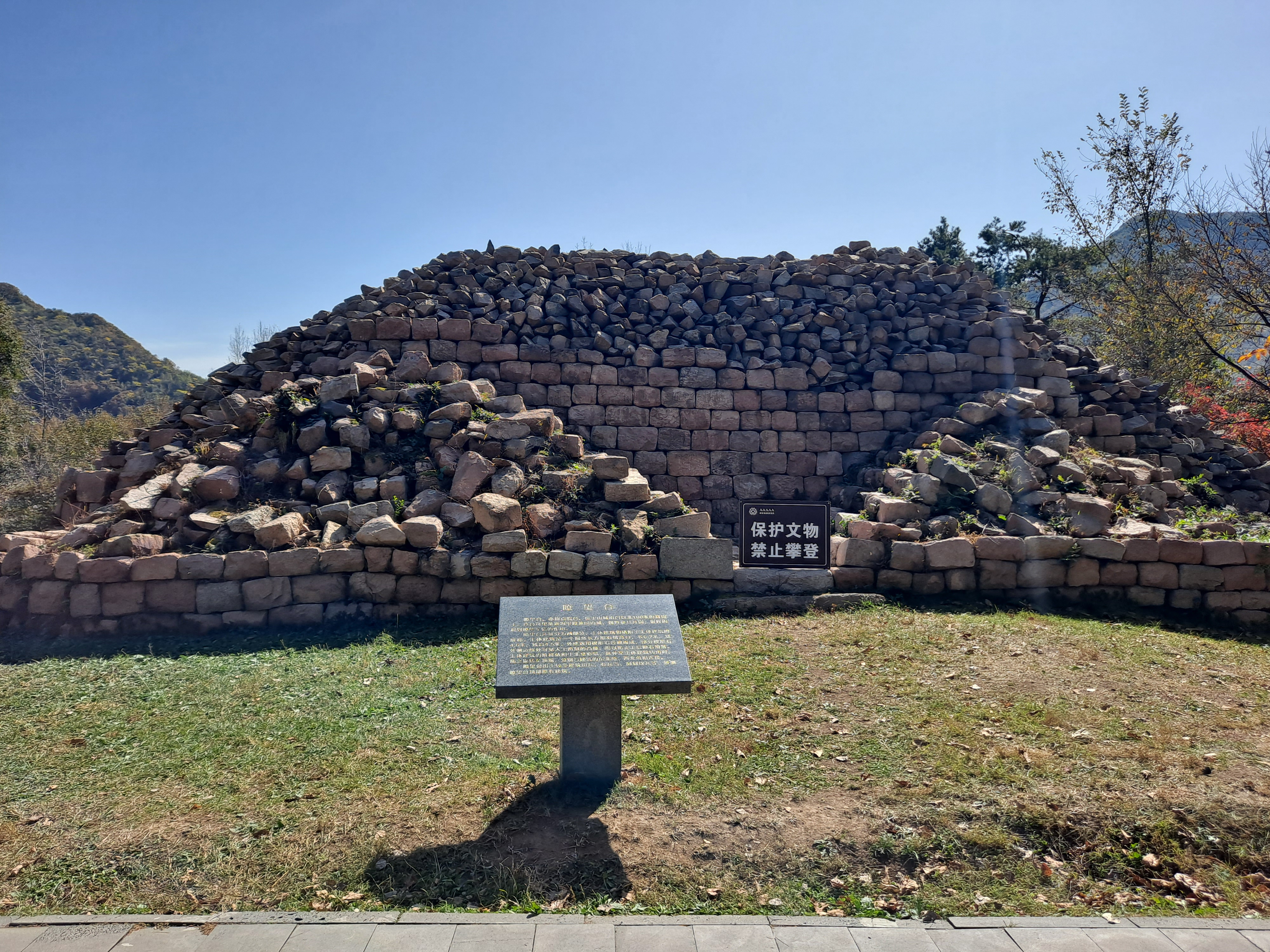
Remains of a guard tower in Hwando

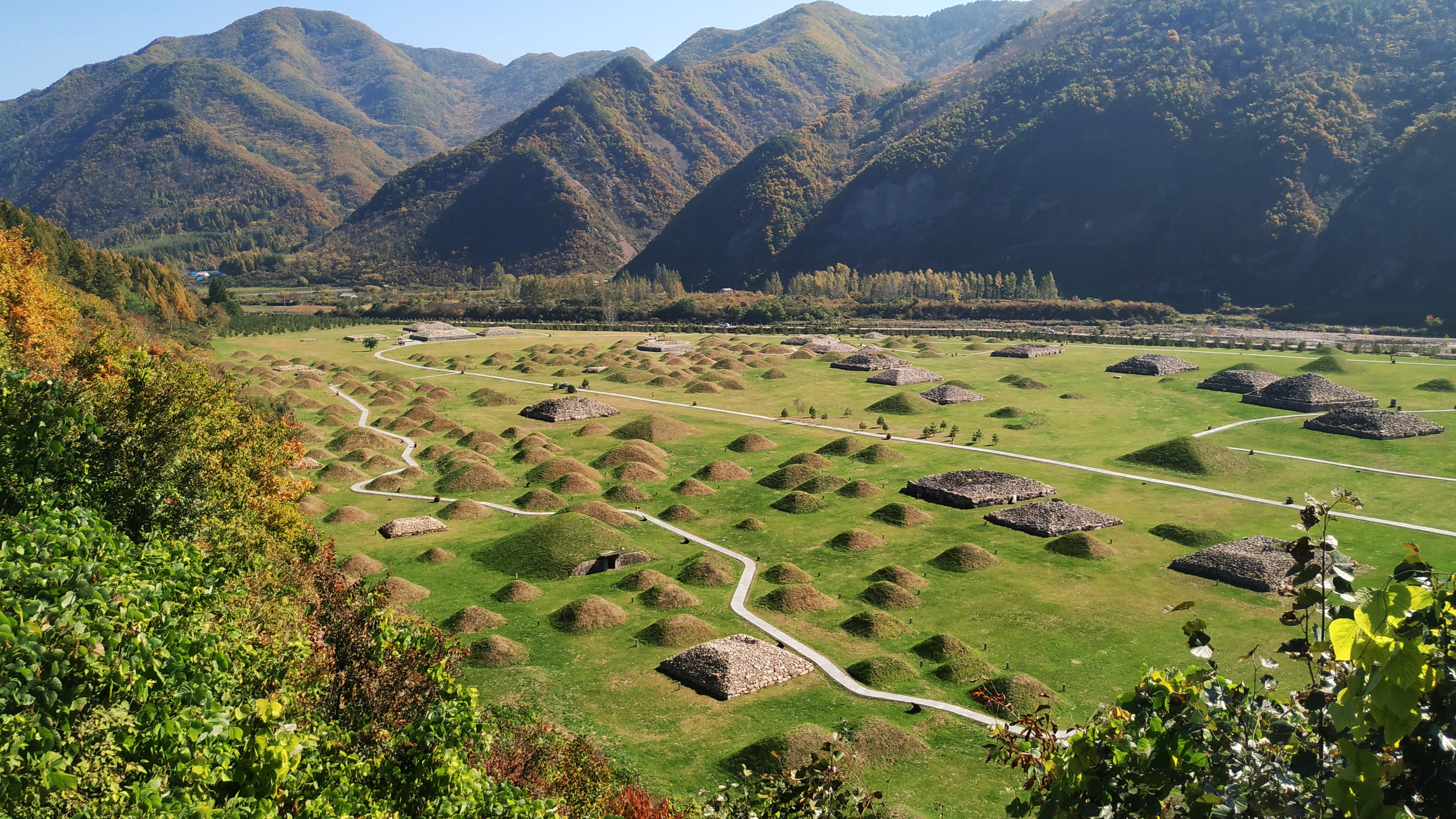
Goguryeo tombs near Hwando

== Administrative divisions ==
Subdistricts:

- Tuanjie Subdistrict (团结街道), Liming Subdistrict (黎明街道), Tongsheng Subdistrict (通胜街道)

Towns:

- Qingshi (青石镇), Qinghe (清河镇), Toudao (头道镇), Huadian (花甸镇), Yulin (榆林镇), Taishang (台上镇), Caiyuan (财源镇), Dalu (大路镇), Taiwang (太王镇)

Townships:

- Maxian Township (麻线乡)
