= Military history of Goguryeo =

The military history of Goguryeo involves wars with other Korean kingdoms, Chinese dynasties, nomadic states and tribes, and Wa Japan. Goguryeo was a highly militaristic state; it was a powerful empire and one of the great powers in East Asia, until it was defeated by a Silla–Tang alliance in 668 after prolonged exhaustion and internal strife caused by the death of Yŏn Kaesomun.

== Conflicts with other Korean states ==
=== Baekje ===
Goguryeo and Baekje were two of the Three Kingdoms of Korea; both claimed descent from the ancient Korean kingdom of Buyeo. Onjo, the founder of Baekje, was said to be the second son of Jumong, the founder of Goguryeo. Despite the common ancestry, the relationship between Goguryeo and Baekje was often contentious.

During the 4th century, Geunchogo expanded Baekje's territory to the north at the expense of Goguryeo. In 369, Gogukwon, the monarch of Goguryeo, attacked Baekje with 20,000 troops, but was defeated by Crown Prince Geungusu at the Battle of Chiyang. In 371, Geungusu led 30,000 troops and attacked the fortress of Pyongyang, slaying Gogukwon in battle. Baekje was a powerful maritime nation whose political influence extended across the sea to Liaoxi and Shandong in China, taking advantage of the weakened state of Former Qin, and to Kyushu in the Japanese archipelago.

Gogukyang, a son of Gogukwon, invaded Baekje in 386.

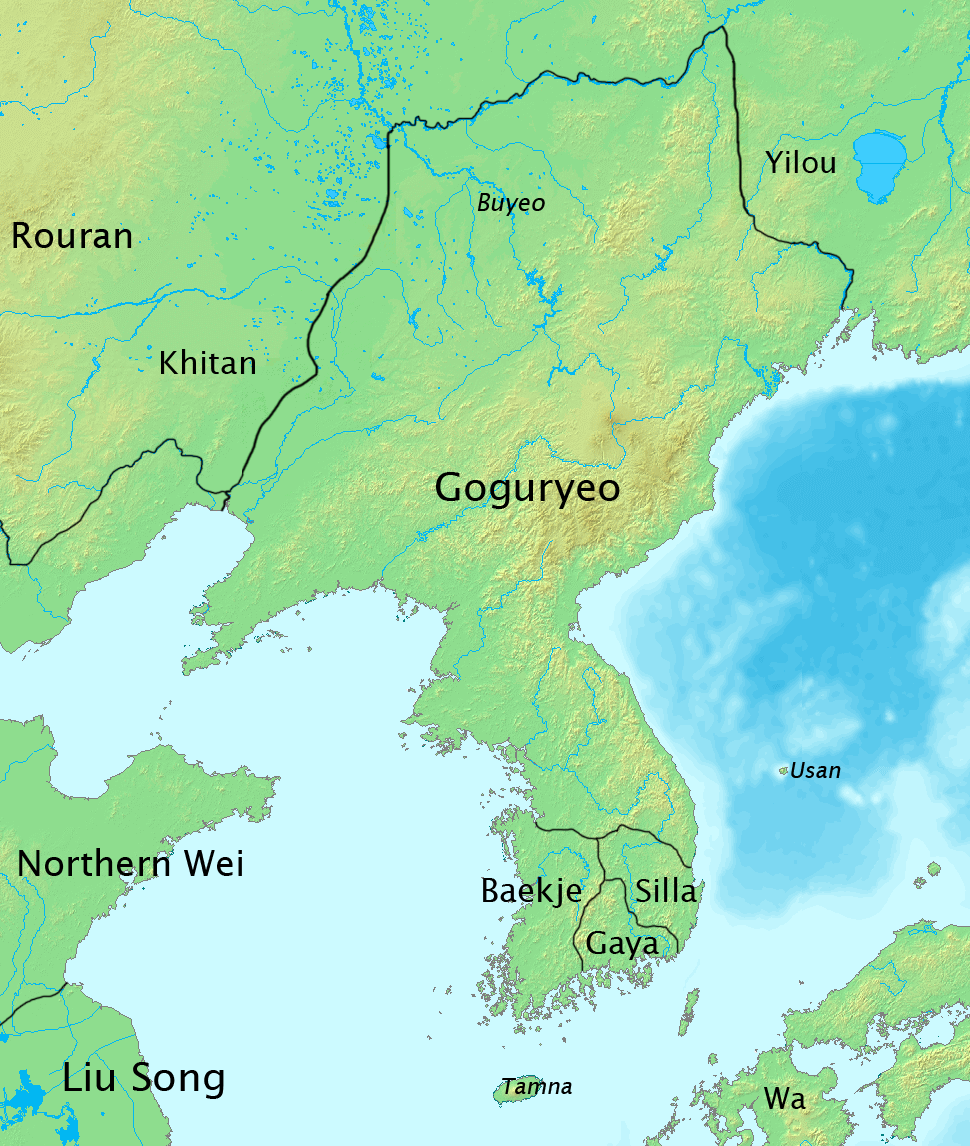
Goguryeo at its height in 476 CE.

In 392, Gwanggaeto the Great led an attack on Baekje with 40,000 troops, capturing 10 walled cities. In response, Asin, the monarch of Baekje, launched a counterattack on Goguryeo in 393 but was defeated. Asin invaded Goguryeo once more in 394, but was defeated again. After suffering multiple defeats against Goguryeo, Baekje's political stability began to crumble. In 395, Baekje was defeated once more by Goguryeo and was pushed south to its capital of Wiryeseong on the Han River. In the following year, in 396, Gwanggaeto led an assault on Wiryeseong by land and sea, using the Han River, and triumphed over Baekje. Gwanggaeto captured the Baekje capital and the defeated Asin submitted to him, surrendering a prince and 10 government ministers. Henceforth, Baekje lost its dominance in the central Korean peninsula and declined.

In 400, Silla requested aid from Goguryeo in repelling an allied invasion by Baekje, Gaya, and Wa. Gwanggaeto dispatched 50,000 troops and annihilated the enemy coalition.

In 433, Baekje and Silla formed an alliance (Hangul: 나제동맹, Hanja: 羅濟同盟) to balance the Goguryeo threat to the north.

In 472, Gaero, the ruler of Baekje, requested a military alliance with Northern Wei against Goguryeo, but was unsuccessful. In 475, Jangsu, the son of Gwanggaeto, launched an invasion by land and sea against Baekje, and captured the capital of Wiryeseong and executed Gaero. Baekje had no choice but to move its capital to mountainous Ungjin (present-day Gongju), 80 miles to the south, which provided a natural protection for the devastated kingdom.

In 479, Baekje and Silla reaffirmed their alliance through marriage, which was the primary reason why Goguryeo was unable to conquer the entire peninsula.

In 551, a Baekje–Silla alliance attacked Goguryeo in order to capture the important Han River region from Goguryeo, planning to split it between them. In 553, Baekje gained the critical region after expending itself with a series of costly assaults on Goguryeo fortresses, but Silla troops, arriving on the pretense of offering assistance, attacked the exhausted Baekje troops and took possession of the entire Han River region, leading to a war between the two former allies in which the Baekje monarch was killed.

Baekje attacked Silla in 612, 624, and 627. Goguryeo and Baekje formed an alliance (Hangul: 여제동맹, Hanja: 麗濟同盟) in 642 aimed toward territorial restoration against Silla. King Uija of Baekje attacked Silla and captured around 40 strongpoints in 642, and 7 more fortresses in 645. In 655, the Goguryeo–Baekje alliance captured 30 fortresses from Silla.

=== Silla ===
In 245, Dongcheon ordered an attack on Silla, but the two kingdoms entered into friendly relations in 248.

Nulji, the king of Silla, who had been a vassal of Jangsu, broke off relations with Goguryeo in 454. Jangsu invaded Silla in 468, expanding his domain into parts of Gangwon Province, and again in 489, capturing 7 walled cities and expanding his domain into parts of North Gyeongsang Province.

Silla emerged as a major player in the Korean Peninsula after its betrayal of Baekje and conquest of the Han River region from Goguryeo in 553, but Goguryeo and Baekje applied political, military, and economic pressure against Silla. In 643, under attack by the Goguryeo–Baekje alliance, the Silla court dispatched Kim Chunchu to the Tang dynasty to request military assistance, leading to Emperor Taizong's campaign against Goguryeo.

In 660, Goguryeo's ally, Baekje, fell to the Silla–Tang alliance, when a combined attack captured the Baekje capital, resulting in the Baekje royal family being brought back to China as prisoners. In 663, a Baekje Prince who had been away in Japan was proclaimed by the Japanese as the rightful King of Baekje, and an expedition was launched by the Japanese to restore the throne. The resulting river battle led to over 400 Japanese warships being sunk, sealing the fate of Baekje, and putting an end to any Japanese influence on the continent for close to 1000 years.

After the initial defeat of the Baekje in 660, the victorious allies continued their assault on Goguryeo for the next eight years, but could not defeat Yŏn Kaesomun. However, Yŏn Kaesomun died of natural causes and civil war ensued among his three sons, leading the Silla–Tang alliance to launch a fresh invasion. In November 668, King Bojang surrendered to the Silla–Tang alliance and Goguryeo finally fell.

== Conflicts with Chinese states ==
=== Han dynasty ===
Goguryeo became a significant independent kingdom in the first century, and began expanding its power in the region. Taejodae conquered neighboring Okjeo and Dongye, and made repeated attacks against the Chinese commanderies and incursions into Liaodong, which would be continued by his successors.

=== Liaodong Commandery ===
The expanding Goguryeo kingdom soon entered into direct military contact with the Liaodong Commandery to its west. Around this time, Chinese warlord Gongsun Kang established the Daifang Commandery by separating the southern half from the Lelang commandery. In 209, Kang invaded Goguryeo, seized some of its territory and weakened Goguryeo. Pressure from Liaodong forced Goguryeo to move their capital in the Hun River valley to the Yalu River valley near Hwando.

=== Cao Wei ===
In 244, Guanqiu Jian, a general of Han's successor state Cao Wei, defeated Dongcheon and briefly occupied and sacked Goguryeo's capital.

Wei invaded again in 259 but was defeated at Yangmaenggok; according to the Samguk Sagi, Jungcheon assembled 5,000 elite cavalry and defeated the invading Wei troops, beheading 8,000 enemies.

=== Lelang commandery ===
As Goguryeo extended its reach into the Liaodong Peninsula, the last Chinese commandery at Lelang was conquered and annexed by Micheon in 313, bringing the remaining northern part of the Korean peninsula into the fold. This conquest resulted in the end of Chinese rule over territory in the northern Korean peninsula, which had spanned 400 years.

=== Former Yan ===
During the winter of 342, the Xianbei of Former Yan, ruled by the Murong clan, attacked and destroyed Goguryeo's capital, Hwando, capturing 50,000 Goguryeo men and women to use as slave labor in addition to taking the queen mother and queen prisoner and exhuming the body of Micheon, and forced Gogukwon to flee for a while. The Xianbei also devastated Buyeo in 346, accelerating Buyeo migration to the Korean peninsula.

=== Later Yan ===
In 385, Gogukyang, the son of Gogukwon, invaded and defeated Later Yan, the successor state of Former Yan.

In 400, the Xianbei state of Later Yan, founded by the Murong clan in present-day Liaoning, attacked Goguryeo. Gwanggaeto the Great repulsed the enemy troops. In 402, Gwanggaeto retaliated and conquered the prominent fortress called 宿軍城 near the capital of Later Yan. In 405 and again in 406, Later Yan troops attacked Goguryeo fortresses in Liaodong (遼東城 in 405, and 木底城 in 406), but was defeated both times. Gwanggaeto conquered all of Liaodong. By conquering Liaodong, Gwanggaeto recovered the ancient domain of Gojoseon; Goguryeo controlled Liaodong until the mid-late 7th century.

=== Sui dynasty ===
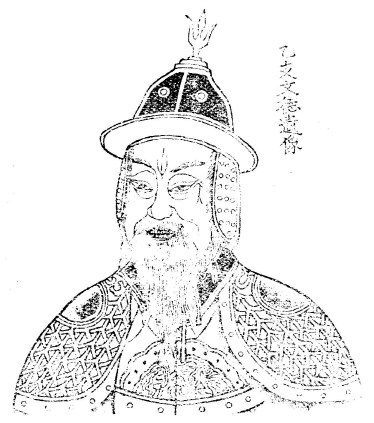
Ŭlchi Mundŏk

In 589, the Northern and Southern dynasties period ended and the Sui dynasty unified China after four centuries of fragmentation. The Sui Empire reconquered Vietnam and defeated Champa, sacking its capital, and conquered important lands in northern China and Central Asia against Turks, Tibetans and proto-Mongolians.

In 598, Goguryeo made a preemptive attack on Liaoxi, leading Emperor Wen to launch a counterattack by land and sea that ended in disaster for Sui.

In 612, Emperor Yang mobilized a huge force said to number over a million men and invaded Goguryeo. Unable to overcome the defenses of Yodong (Liaodong) Fortress, Emperor Yang ordered 305,000 troops to attack the Goguryeo capital of Pyongyang. However, General Ŭlchi Mundŏk baited the Sui troops and annihilated them at the Battle of Salsu; according to Chinese historical records: of the 305,000 Sui troops, a mere 2,700 returned. Emperor Yang lifted his siege of the Korean fortress and withdrew his forces back to China.

Emperor Yang was obsessed with defeating Goguryeo. He attacked Goguryeo again in 613 and 614, but failed against Goguryeo's defensive strategies, fierce resistance, and able leadership; furthermore, his campaign in 613 was cut short by internal discontent and floods back home. Emperor Yang's disastrous defeats in Korea greatly contributed to the collapse of the Sui dynasty.

=== Tang dynasty ===
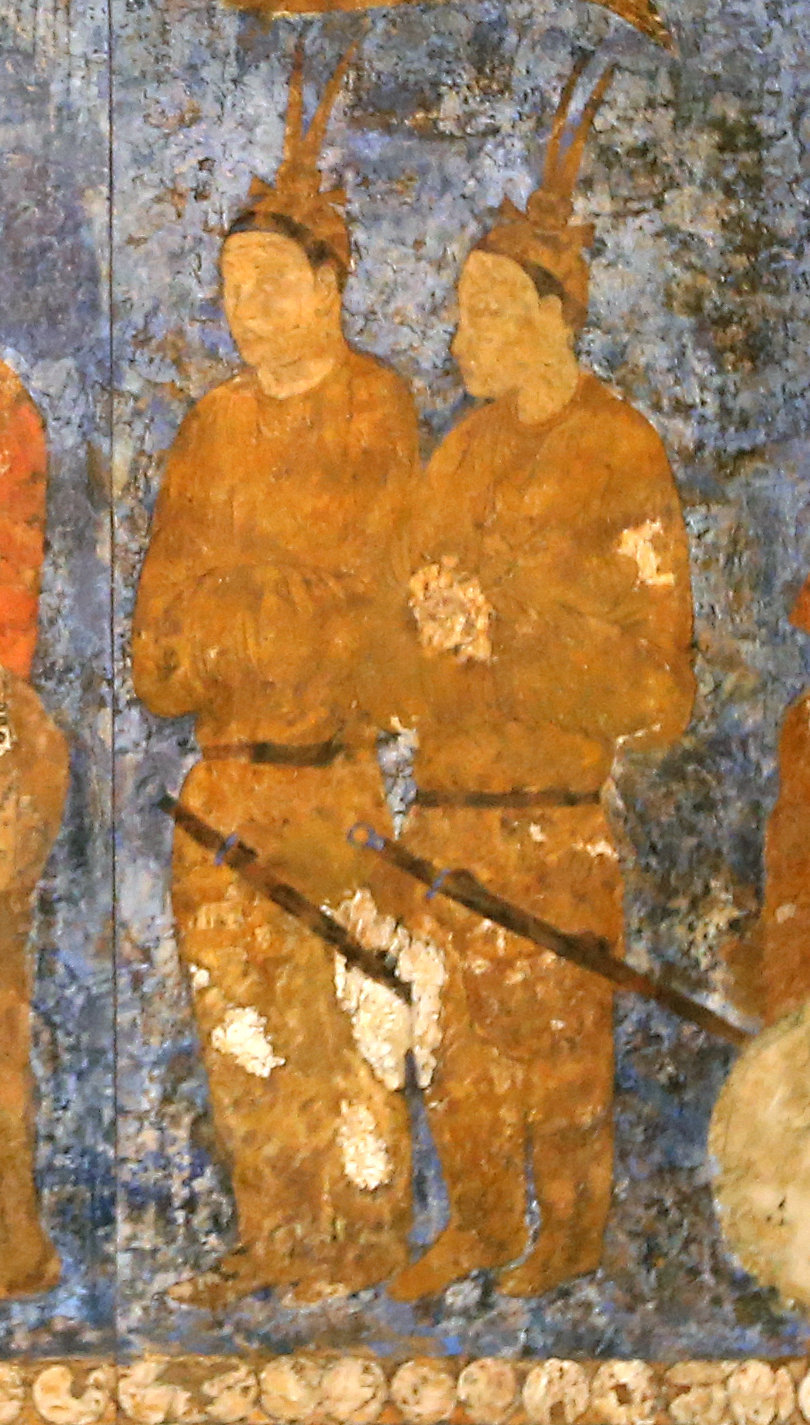
Korean ambassadors during an audience with king Varkhuman of Samarkand. They are identified by the two feathers on top of their head. 648-651 CE, Afrasiyab murals, Samarkand.

Emperor Taizong ascended the Tang throne in 626, and led many successful military campaigns. In 630, Emperor Taizong defeated the Eastern Turkic Khaganate, an ally of Goguryeo, bringing much of Central Asia under Tang control; he then conquered the Tarim Basin, and defeated the Tibetan Empire in 640. In 643, Queen Seondeok of Silla requested military aid against the Goguryeo–Baekje alliance. Tang forged an alliance with Silla, and began preparations for a major campaign against Goguryeo in 644.

In 645, Emperor Taizong personally led a campaign against Goguryeo by land and sea with 113,000 Tang troops plus an unspecified number of tribal auxiliaries. His noted army captured a number of Goguryeo border fortresses, including the potent Yodong (Liaodong) Fortress, which had repulsed Emperor Yang in 612 and 613. Arriving outside Ansi Fortress on July 18, Emperor Taizong prepared to meet an approaching relief army, said to number 150,000 men, in battle. Emperor Taizong ordered Li Shiji to bait the Koreans with 15,000 troops, while Zhangsun Wuji's concealed troops would ambush them from behind. On the following day, the two sides clashed and Emperor Taizong inflicted a crushing defeat on the confused Koreans, inflicting 20,000 casualties and capturing 36,800 prisoners. Emperor Taizong then laid siege to Ansi Fortress; his troops attacked the Korean fortress as many as six or seven times per day, but were repelled each time by the defenders. Unable to breach the adamant fortress despite months of siege, Tang eventually staked everything on the construction of a huge mound, designed to tower over the walls of the fortress; however, the defenders captured and successfully held the mound despite three days of frantic assaults by Tang troops. Furthermore, exacerbated by worsened conditions for the Tang army due to cold weather (and winter approaching) and diminishing provisions, Emperor Taizong was compelled to order a withdrawal from Goguryeo on October 13, but left behind an extravagant gift for Yang Manch'un, the commander of Ansi Fortress.

Emperor Taizong attacked Goguryeo again in 647 and 648, but was unsuccessful.

Defeating Goguryeo had been an obsession with Emperor Taizong, and after his death in 649, his son Emperor Gaozong continued his ambition. Upon the suggestion of Kim Chunchu, the Silla–Tang alliance first conquered Baekje in 660 to break up the Goguryeo–Baekje alliance, and then turned its full attention to Goguryeo. However, Emperor Gaozong, too, was unable to defeat Goguryeo led by Yŏn Kaesomun; one of Yŏn Kaesomun's most notable victories came in 662 at the Battle of Sasu (蛇水), where he annihilated the Tang forces and killed the invading general Pang Xiaotai (龐孝泰) and all 13 of his sons. Hence, while Yŏn Kaesomun was alive, Tang could not defeat Goguryeo.

==== Fall and aftermath ====
In 666 (though dates vary from 664–666), Yŏn Kaesomun died of natural causes and a civil war ensued among his three sons. His eldest son and immediate successor, Yŏn Namsaeng, defected to Tang and provided the secrets and weaknesses of Goguryeo to Emperor Gaozong, and played a critical role in the next invasion and downfall of Goguryeo. Yŏn Kaesomun's second son, Yŏn Namgŏn, resisted in the face of death, as opposed to his brother's treachery, and fought until the very end. Meanwhile, Yŏn Kaesomun's younger brother, Yŏn Chŏngto, defected to the Silla side.

The Tang–Silla alliance mounted a fresh invasion of Goguryeo in 667, aided by the defector Yŏn Namsaeng, and in 668, finally vanquished the divided kingdom, which had been plagued by violent dissension, numerous defections, and widespread demoralization following the death of Yŏn Kaesomun.

Silla thus unified most of the Korean peninsula in 668, but the kingdom's reliance on Tang China had its price. Tang China attempted to impose its rule over the entire Korean peninsula, but Silla, aided by Goguryeo and Baekje refugees, forcibly resisted and expelled Tang. However, Silla's unification of the Three Kingdoms of Korea was short-lived because the former Goguryeo general Dae Joyeong led remnants of Goguryeo, united with the Mohe people, and established Balhae, a successor of Goguryeo. Balhae eventually reconquered and retained much of Goguryeo's former territory.

The Tang dynasty Goguryeo general Gao Juren ordered a mass slaughter of Sogdian Caucasians from West and Central Asia, identifying them through their big noses and lances were used to impale Caucasian children when he stormed Beijing (Jicheng (Beijing)) from An Lushan when he defeated An Lushan's rebels.

Balhae became a powerful empire like its predecessor, but its eventual end came at the hands of the Khitan Empire in 926. Balhae's end was a decisive event in Northeast Asian history for it was the last Korean kingdom to hold territory in Manchuria. Goguryeo was revived once more in 918 by successor state Goryeo, founded by Wang Geon, a descendant of Goguryeo nobility. In 937, much of the ruling class and the last crown prince of collapsed Balhae fled to Goryeo, where he was warmly welcomed and included into the ruling family by Wang Geon, thus unifying the two successor nations of Goguryeo.

== Conflicts with nomadic states ==
In 395, Gwanggaeto the Great invaded the Khitan Baili clan to the west on the Liao River, destroying 3 tribes and 600 to 700 camps.

In 398, Gwanggaeto conquered the Sushen people to the northeast, who were Tungusic ancestors of the Jurchens and Manchus.

In 479, Jangsu invaded the Khitans, and then attacked the Didouyu with his Rouran allies.

== Conflicts with Japanese states ==
In 404, Gwanggaeto defeated an attack by the Wa from the Japanese archipelago on the southern border of what was once the Daifang commandery, inflicting enormous casualties on the enemy.

== See also ==
- History of Korea
- Military history of Korea
