= Goguryeo–Yan Wars =

319–407 wars in Northeast Asia

- Part of Sixteen Kingdoms and Three Kingdoms of Korea
Date	319–407 AD
Location	Liaoning, Manchuria and Korean Peninsula

Belligerents
Murong; Former Yan; Later Yan	Goguryeo

Commanders and leaders
Murong Hui; Murong Huang; Murong Chui; Murong Sheng; Murong Xi	Micheon; Gogugwon; Gogugyang; Gwanggaeto the Great

The Goguryeo–Yan Wars were a series of wars between the Korean state of Goguryeo and the Murong-Xianbei states of Former Yan and Later Yan in the 4th and early 5th century. The Murong, who settled in Liaodong with assent from the Chinese imperial court, clashed on several occasions with the neighbouring Goguryeo and went as far as sacking their capital, Hwando in 342, forcing them into submission.

After a brief period under Former Qin rule, the Murong restored their state as the Later Yan, and hostility resumed between them and Goguryeo. The Goguryeo king, Gwanggaeto the Great invaded Yan and made significant gains by capturing the Liaodong Peninsula in 404. The conflict came to an end in 407 with the ascension of Gao Yun, an adopted member of the ruling-Murong clan and a distant relative of the Goguryeo imperial family, establishing several years of peace between Goguryeo and the succeeding Northern Yan dynasty.

== Background ==
=== Arrival of the Murong tribe ===
Originating from the northern steppe, the Murong was a Xianbei tribe that migrated to the Liaodong region after the collapse of Tanshihuai's confederation in the late 2nd and early 3rd century. In 238, they were allowed to settle deep into Liaodong after assisting the Cao Wei commander, Sima Yi, in his campaign against the warlord, Gongsun Yuan. The earliest instance of conflict between the Murong and Goguryeo occurred in 244, when the chieftain, Murong Muyan participated with distinction in Guanqiu Jian's expeditions against Goguryeo.

=== Murong Hui and Micheon (319–321) ===
The Murong maintained vassalage to the Wei and its successor, the Western Jin, going through a significant degree of sinicization under Murong Hui. At the start of the 4th century, the Western Jin was thrown into chaos by the War of the Eight Princes and the Uprising of the Five Barbarians. The Goguryeo king, Micheon took advantage and launched several raids on Chinese commanderies. In 313, he conquered Lelang, and in 314, he annexed Daifang after attacking Seoanpyeong (서안평; near modern Dandong, Liaoning) in Liaodong. The local Chinese commander, Zhang Tong, was unable to repel the invaders, so he abandoned the commanderies and joined Murong Hui with his followers.

Goguryeo then shifted their focus towards the Murong. In 319, they allied with the Chinese Inspector of Ping province, Cui Bi, along with the Xianbei Duan and Yuwen tribes, to attack the Murong, but withdrew from campaign due to their distrust of the Yuwen. Goguryeo received Cui Bi after his defeat that year, but soon after, Murong Hui captured their city of Haseong (하성; location unknown) and the general, Yeo Noja (여노자). For the next two years, Murong Hui and Micheon launched several attacks against one another before eventually agreeing to peace in 321. Nonetheless, hoping to encircle the Murong, Micheon sent tribute to the Later Zhao dynasty in 330, who by this point, had unified most of northern China. Micheon died the following year, succeeded by his son Gogugwon, while Murong Hui died in 333, succeeded by his son, Murong Huang.

== Former Yan ==
=== Incursion at Sinseong (339) ===
In 337, Murong Huang claimed the imperial title of Prince of (Former) Yan and began a policy of rapid expansion to compete with the Later Zhao. Shortly after his ascension, he vanquished the Duan tribe in Liaoxi and repelled a major Zhao invasion at his capital of Jicheng. The Heavenly King of Zhao, Shi Hu, sent a large shipment of grains to Goguryeo for a follow-up campaign against the Yan. However, in September or October 339, Murong Huang invaded Goguryeo and reached as far as Sinseong (신성; in present-day Fushun, Liaoning), where Gogugwon offered to pay tribute in exchange for peace.

=== Murong Huang's invasion of Goguryeo (342) ===
In 342, after moving his capital to Longcheng, Murong Huang considered his options between campaigning against the Yuwen or Goguryeo. His half-brother, Murong Han advocated attacking Goguryeo first; he anticipated that Goguryeo would attack while they were away against the Yuwen, while the Yuwen were too dependent on their defences to launch an invasion in any situation. Murong Huang listened to his advice.

In November or December 342, Murong Huang departed for Goguryeo with his army. There were two routes going into Goguryeo; the narrow and rough southern route, and the wide and flat northern route. Murong Han suggested that they take Goguryeo by surprise by leading the main force through the southern route, while a lesser force travel through the northern route to act as a decoy. Murong Huang agreed, so he led 40,000 soldiers through the south with his son, Murong Ba and Murong Han commanding the vanguard while his Chief Clerk, Wang Yu (王寓) led 15,000 troops through the north.

As Murong Han had anticipated, Gogugwon garrisoned his brother, Go Mu (고무) on the northern route with 50,000 elite troops while he defended the southern route with weaker soldiers. Murong Ba and Murong Han were the first to arrive and fight Gogugwon at Mogjeo (목저; northwest of present-day Xinbin Manchu Autonomous County, Liaoning), followed by Murong Huang. The Yan general, Xianyu Liang, with a few cavalry, charged into the Goguryeo formation and caused disorder within their ranks. The main Yan force crushed Gogugwon's army, killing his general, Abulhwadoga (아불화도가). They then pursued the retreating Goguryeo soldiers and broke into their capital, Hwando.

Gogugwon fled on horseback with his family to Dan-ung Valley (단웅곡; around the middle or upper reaches of the Yalu River). He was chased after by the Yan general, Muyu Ni (慕輿泥), who captured his mother, Lady Ju (주씨) and his wife before withdrawing. Meanwhile, Wang Yu was repelled by Go Mu on the northern route, though Murong Huang decided not to confront him. He sent messengers to Gogugwon asking him to surrender, but he refused and remained in hiding. Before leaving Hwando, Murong Huang ordered the palaces burnt and the walls destroyed. He dug out the body of Micheon, bringing it home with him along with treasures and more than 50,000 people as slaves.

=== Aftermath ===
In February or March 343, Gogugwon sent his younger brother with treasures to submit to the Yan. Murong Huang responded by returning Micheon's body, but not Lady Ju, and later in 345, he sent his son, Murong Ke to seize the Goguryeo city of Namso (남소; southeast of present-day Tieling County, Liaoning). Gogugwon returned a Yan defector in 349, and in 355, while sending tribute, he specifically requested the release of his mother, which was finally granted. He was also bestowed titles and offices by the Yan court.

For the next few decades, Goguryeo did not expand westward into Chinese territory, seemingly weakened by the Yan invasion. When the Former Yan was conquered by the Former Qin in 370, Goguryeo established friendly ties with the Qin court and sent tribute.

== Later Yan ==
=== Gogugyang's invasion of Liaodong and Xuantu (385) ===
In 384, following the disastrous Battle of Fei River the previous year, the Murong rebelled against Qin and restored their state as the Later Yan under Murong Chui. Northern China was once more in chaos, and Goguryeo found themselves bordering the Yan again. In June or July 385, with the Yan preoccupied in Hebei, King Gogugyang ordered his soldiers to invade Liaodong. The general, Hao Jing (郝景) went to reinforce but was defeated, causing Liaodong and Xuantu commanderies to fall to Goguryeo. Their hold over the commaderies was brief, however, as later that year in October or November, the Yan general, Murong Nong attacked Goguryeo and recovered them.

=== Gwanggaeto's war (400–407) ===
Gogugyang died in 391. His son, Gwanggaeto, ascended the throne and claimed the title of Taewang, putting himself on the same standing as the imperial rulers of China. For the next few years, he carried out several successful campaigns against Baekje, the Khitan and the Sushen people. On the contrary, the Later Yan suffered heavy defeats at the hands of the Northern Wei and were ejected from Hebei. Their territory was reduced to modern-day Liaoning, and the Murong clan was plagued by rebellions and coups.

In 399, Gwanggaeto paid tribute by sending gifts, including green-headed white sparrows, to the Emperor of Yan, Murong Sheng, who reciprocated by renaming one of his gardens to White Sparrow Garden. However, in the following months, the Yan claimed that Gwanggaeto was "slow in paying respect". On 26 March 400, while Gwanggaeto was away campaigning in Silla, Murong Sheng led 30,000 soldiers to carry out a surprise attack on Goguryeo. His uncle, Murong Xi, commanded the vanguard, and they captured the cities of Sinseong and Namso. The Yan distributed the city grains among their soldiers and forcibly relocated 5,000 households from Goguryeo to Liaoxi.

Gwanggaeto retaliated by attacking the Yan city of Sujun (宿軍; in present-day Beizhen, Liaoning) in May or June 402, causing the Yan Inspector of Ping province, Murong Gui (慕容歸) to abandon and flee the city. In 404, he launched another invasion of Yan, and this time, conquered Liaodong.

On 12 March 405, Murong Xi, who succeeded Murong Sheng in 401, responded to their recent loss by invading Goguryeo. His forces laid siege on the city of Liaodong, employing battering rams and tunnels before eventually breaching the walls. However, Murong Xi reportedly ordered his soldiers not to enter the breach and instead to flatten the walls to the ground so that he and his empress, Fu Xunying can enter the city in their carriage. Subsequently, the defenders were able to repair the breach and keep the attackers out. Eventually, it began to rain and snow heavily, and many of the Yan soldiers succumbed to the elements, forcing them to retreat.

In January or February 406, Murong Xi led an expedition against the Khitan people, but when he arrived at their territory, he was unsettled by the size of their forces. He initially wanted to return to his territory, but at the behest of Fu Xunying, he decided to conduct a raid on Goguryeo. He abandoned his supply trains and led his light cavalry, but the journey would prove long and deadly; many of the Yan soldiers and horses died of exhaustion and freezing along the way. When they reached the city of Mogjeo, they were unable to capture it and withdrew.

== Aftermath ==
The long-standing conflict between the Murong and Goguryeo came to an end in around 407. That year, Gao Yun, also known as Murong Yun, deposed Murong Xi and claimed the throne of Yan. Gao was a descendant of the imperial Goguryeo family; after Murong Huang sacked Hwando in 342, his grandfather was among the people who were brought back from the campaign and resettled in Yan. Later on, Gao Yun became a distinguished general and was adopted into the Murong clan. Gwanggaeto recognized Gao Yun as a distant relative and sent envoys to his new kingdom to establish friendly relations.

Gao Yun's state is known in historiography as the Northern Yan, and although he was soon assassinated by a subordinate and succeeded by his Chinese friend, Feng Ba, the border between Goguryeo and China would experience a lengthy period of relative peace. The Liaodong Peninsula would also remain under Goguryeo control until the 7th century, when they were conquered by the Tang dynasty.
