= Gwanggaeto, The Great Conqueror =

South Korean television series

- Also known as: King Gwanggaeto the Great
- Hangul: 광개토태왕
- Hanja: 廣開土太王
- RR: Gwanggaeto taewang
- MR: Kwanggaet'o t'aewang
- Written by: Jo Myung-joo; Jang Ki-chang
- Starring: Lee Tae-gon; Kim Seung-soo; Im Ho; Park Jung-chul; Oh Ji-eun; Lee In-hye
- Country of origin: South Korea
- No. of episodes: 92

Production
- Executive producer: Lee Jae-yong
- Producer: KBS Drama Production Bureau
- Production locations: Mungyeong, North Gyeongsang Province
- Camera setup: Multi-camera
- Running time: Saturdays and Sundays at 21:40 (KST)

Original release
- Network: KBS1
- Release: June 4, 2011 – April 29, 2012

Gwanggaeto, The Great Conqueror, also known as King Gwanggaeto the Great, is a historical drama based on the life of the nineteenth monarch of Goguryeo, Gwanggaeto the Great. The drama was based on two sources, Gwanggaeto the Great by Jeong Jip, and Great Conquests of Gwanggaeto by Hyeong Minu.

== Synopsis ==
Goguryeo, at the time of the protagonist's birth, is no longer as powerful as it used to be. Prior to his birth, his grandfather, King Gogugwon was killed by the Baekje forces led by King Geunchogo. When his uncle King Sosurim died without an heir, his father King Gogugyang rose to the throne of Goguryeo. At the same time, they were also under attack by the Later Yan forces, led by none other than the Emperor of Later Yan himself, Murong Chui.

After his father's death, he rises to the throne and vows to restore Goguryeo to its former glory. His struggle would later form the basis of a popular Korean legend. He would regain land lost to Baekjae, and he will defeat many other smaller kingdoms in the process. Near the end of the story, he manages to obliterate Later Yan and later subjugated her as a sister state.

== Cast ==
- Lee Tae-gon as Damdeok (later as Supreme King Yeongnak, and afterwards Gwanggaeto the Great)
- Kim Seung-soo as Go Un (also known as Gao Yun/Murong Un) Adopted son of Murong Bao and later king of Later Yan (Gae Yeonsu's son)
- Im Ho as Murong Bao (Crown Prince of Later Yan, later became Emperor)
- Park Jung-chul as Asin (Prince and later King of Baekje)
- Oh Ji-eun as Doyoung (Damdeok's childhood friend & first wife; Gae Yeonsu's daughter) killed in the battle of Wiryeseong
- Lee In-hye as Yakyeon (Wife of Damdeok / Queen of Goguryeo; Go Mu's stepdaughter)

=== Damdeok's followers ===
- Bang Hyung-joo as Yeo Seok-gae
- Kim Jung-hyun as Dol Bisu (Member of Cheongun)
- Hong Kyung-in as Yeon Salta (Killed in the battle of Sujuncheng)
- Kim Chul-ki as Sagal Hyeon (Damdeok's Chief of Security; killed by Asin during the battle of Gwanmiseong)
- Kim Jung-hwa as Seol Ji (Seol Doan's sister and later Damdeok's bodyguard)
- Kim Young-ki as General Hae Mowol (servant of Gae Yeonsu and later Damdeok's follower)
- Kim Jin-tae as Go Mu (Damdeok's Grandfather and King Gogugwon's brother), died after the duel with Murong Chui during the second siege of Yodongseong Fortress by Later Yan and Biryeo Khitan forces
- Nam Sung-jin as Go Chang (Damdeok's Uncle and Go Mu's son)
- Lee Won-bal as Mo Duyeong
- Im Dae-ho as Mo Duru (elder brother of Mo Duyeong)
- Kim Myung-su as Hwang Hoe (leader of central army)
- Yun Seung-won as Ha Muji (Damdeok's Military Advisor from Liuju; he was killed by Houyan general)
- Park Seung-ho as Do Gwang (General who sided Murong Un and later died as Damdeok's follower)

=== Later Yan army ===
- Kim Dong-hyun as Murong Chui (1st Emperor of Later Yan who was killed by his son Murong Xi by a poison)
- Jung Ho-keun as Feng Ba (loyal general of Later Yan/Houyan)
- Kim Duk-hyun

=== Ministers of Goguryeo ===
- Choi Dong-joon as Gae Yeonsu (Prime Minister of Goguryeo; killed by Damdeok during the coup attempt)
- Oh Wook-chul as Ga Raji (executed for arranging assassination attempt of Damdoek which ended up killing Dammang instead)
- Im Byung-ki as Yeo Soyi (executed for being involved in the coup attempt led by Gae Yeonsu)
- Ban Suk-jin as Yeon Dobu (Yeon Salta's Father; also executed for being involved in the coup attempt led by Gae Yeonsu)
- Sun Dong-hyuk as Gye Pil (appointed as Prime Minister upon the execution of Gae Yeonsu)
- Choi Sang-hoon as Lee Young (damdeok's uncle and younger brother of king Gogugyang)

=== Royal family of Goguryeo ===
- Jung Tae-woo as Dammang (Damdeok's elder brother; Saved Damdoek, sacrificed himself to pave the way for Damdeok; killed by Houyan spies while hunting)
- Song Yong-tae as Iryeon (also as King Gogugyang, Gwanggaeto's father)
- Lee Bo-hee as Queen Goya (Damdeok's mother; killed during the coup attempt)
- Jo An as Princess Damju (Damdeok's sister, Crown Princess of Later Yan/ Murong Bao's wife; Killed by Murong Xi)
- Lee Hui-sung as Huwang (son of Murong Bao and Princess Damju)

=== Other people ===
- Kim Kyu-chul as Seol Doan (Supreme Chief of Malgal Tribe)
- Lee Dal-hyung
- Lee Dae-ro
- Lee Ji-hyun as Ar Yi (Khitan soldier and later became Damdeok's follower)
- Lee Jung-sung as foreign Leader (captured by Damdeok thru Baekje's General help)
- Chongmeong (Ha Muji's sidekick and became Damdeok's follower)

== See also ==
- Gwanggaeto Stele
