= Jangsu of Goguryeo =

20th King of Goguryeo (r. 413–491)

King Jangsu
- Taewang
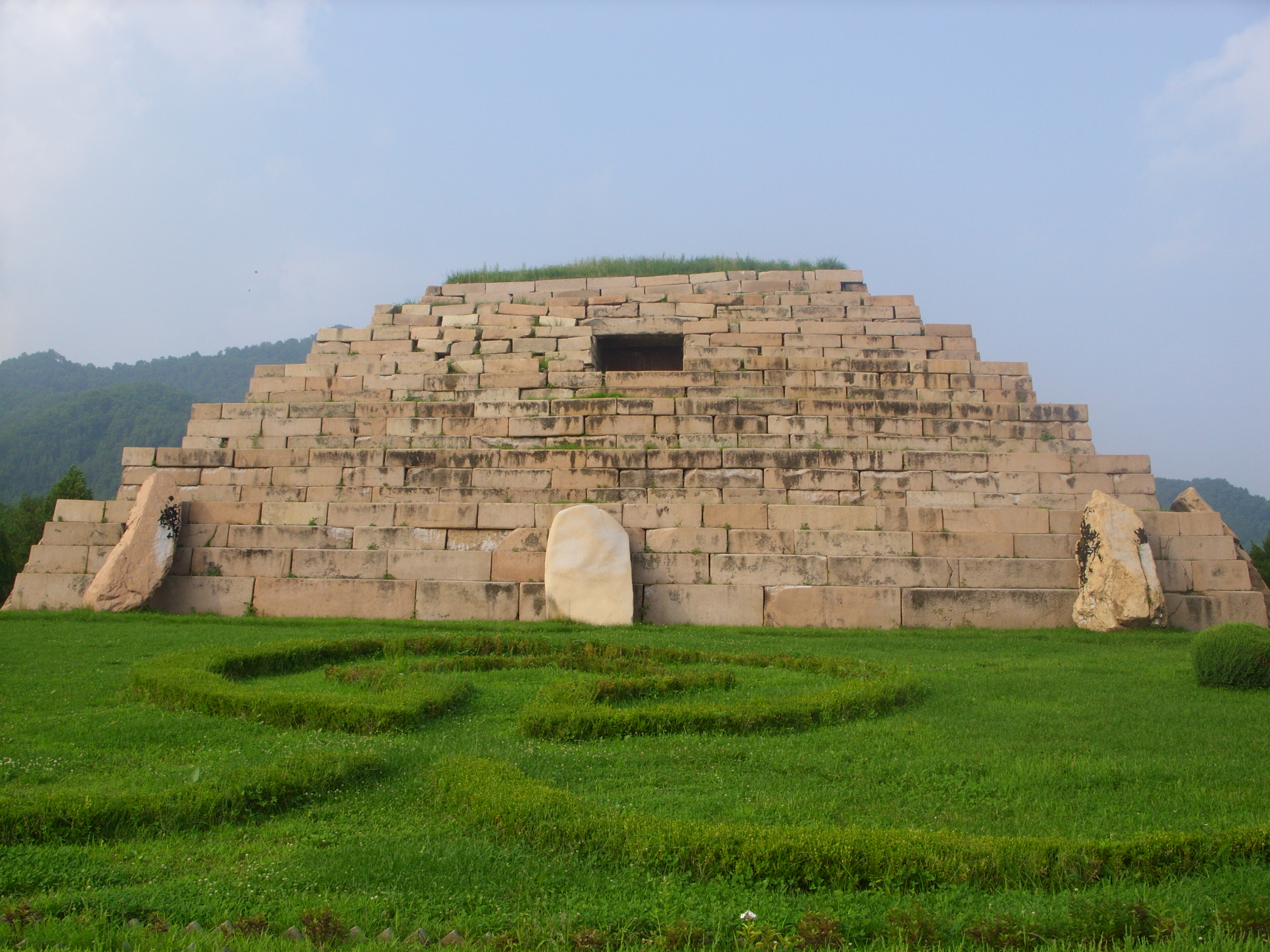
- The "Tomb of the General" in Ji'an, China, former capital of Goguryeo. Chinese scholars posit this to be the tomb of King Jangsu and his consort, though many Korean scholars argue Jangsu's tomb is in Pyongyang, where Jangsu had moved the capital in 427 (July 2010).

King of Goguryeo
- Reign: October 412 – December 491
- Coronation: October 412; Goguryeo Gungnae Seong
- Predecessor: Gwanggaeto
- Successor: Munjamyeong

Crown Prince of Goguryeo
- Crown Prince: April 409 – October 412
- Coronation: April 409
- Predecessor: Gwanggaeto
- Successor: Go Joda
- Born: 394; Goguryeo Gungnae Seong
- Died: 491 (aged 96–97); Goguryeo Pyongyang Seong
- Burial: Tomb of the General
- Issue: Crown Prince Juda
Posthumous name
- Jangsu; Kang
- House: Go
- Father: Gwanggaeto the Great

- Jangsu of Goguryeo
- Hangul: 거련; 연
- Hanja: 巨連; 璉
- RR: Georyeon; Yeon
- MR: Kŏryŏn; Yŏn

Monarch name
- Hangul: 장수왕
- Hanja: 長壽王
- RR: Jangsuwang
- MR: Changsuwang

Jangsu (394–491, r. 412–491) was the 20th monarch of Goguryeo, the northernmost of the Three Kingdoms of Korea. He was born in 394 as the eldest son of Gwanggaeto. He became the crown prince in 409, and upon his father's death in 412, became the ruler at the age of 18.

Jangsu reigned during the golden age of Goguryeo, when it was a powerful empire and one of the great powers in East Asia. He continued to build upon his father's territorial expansion through conquest, but was also known for his diplomatic abilities. Like his father, Gwanggaeto the Great, Jangsu also achieved a loose unification of the Three Kingdoms of Korea. In addition, Jangsu's long reign saw the perfecting of Goguryeo's political, economic and other institutional arrangements. He is also noted for building the Gwanggaeto Stele, dedicated to his father. Jangsu's posthumous name means "Long Life", based on his longstanding reign of 79 years until the age of 97, the longest reign in East Asian history.

During his reign, Jangsu changed the official name of Goguryeo (Koguryŏ) to the shortened Goryeo (Koryŏ), from which the English name Korea originates.

== Family ==
- Father: King Gwanggaeto (광개토왕; 廣開土王)
  - Grandfather: King Gogukyang (고국양왕; 故國壤王)
- Unknown wife
  - Son: Prince Joda/Juda (조다; 助多); father of King Munja.
  - Son: Prince gong (공; 共)
  - Unnamed daughter

== Early reign ==
During his early reign, Jangsu dedicated much of his efforts toward stabilizing an empire that had experienced great and sudden growth as a direct result of his father's conquests. Jangsu built a magnificent tomb for his father, Gwanggaeto the Great, and along with it an imposing 6-meter-tall (20 ft) tombstone engraved with his father's accomplishments (now known as the Gwanggaeto Stele).

In 427, he transferred the Goguryeo capital from Gungnae Fortress (present-day Ji'an on the China-North Korea border) to Pyongyang, a more suitable region to grow into a burgeoning metropolitan capital, which led Goguryeo to achieve a high level of cultural and economic prosperity.

== Relations with Chinese dynasties and nomadic states ==
When Gwanggaeto the Great ruled Goguryeo, China was dominated by five non-Han Chinese peoples and divided into multiple states. During Gwanggaeto's time, Goguryeo invaded Later Yan and conquered Liaoning, but when Jangsu came to the throne, the chaos in northern China was coming to an end. The unification of northern China by Northern Wei became a crucial point for both Goguryeo and the southern dynasties of China. However, Jangsu was able to use the political situation in China by manipulating the northern and southern Chinese states to his advantage.

After the fall of Later Yan, Han Chinese drove the Xianbei Murong clan northward and established Northern Yan in its place. However, Northern Yan's existence was threatened by the powerful Xianbei Tuoba clan of Northern Wei to the west, compelling Northern Yan to make an alliance with Goguryeo, its neighbor to the east. Hence, Jangsu turned his military ambitions southward toward the Korean peninsula.

The southern Chinese dynasty of Liu Song, which was feuding with Northern Wei, encouraged both Northern Yan and Goguryeo to oppose Northern Wei. However, Liu Song's plan did not work out, as Goguryeo imprisoned the emperor of Northern Yan in 438. The Liu Song court was outraged and warned Jangsu that the death of the Northern Yan ruler would lead to war. However, Jangsu ignored the threat and executed him, bringing the short-lived Northern Yan dynasty to an end. Liu Song troops then attacked Goguryeo but were easily defeated. Peace resumed in the following year when Jangsu sent 800 horses as a gift to the Liu Song emperor, to aid him in his ongoing war against Northern Wei, allowing Goguryeo to concentrate its forces against Baekje and Silla to the south while Liu Song and Northern Wei were occupied against each other to the west. Jangsu again encouraged Liu Song to invade Northern Wei in 459 when he sent loads of crossbows and provided gold and silver. The Northern Wei government was upset by Jangsu's actions but had to keep peace with Goguryeo to continue its war against Liu Song and the Rouran Khaganate.

Jangsu also maintained contact with Northern Wei, and the two empires established a formal relationship in 435. This relationship proved to be useful when Goguryeo waged war against Baekje, which had secretly sought a military alliance with Northern Wei against Goguryeo, because Northern Wei did not interfere in the matters of the Korean countries.

In 479, Jangsu established friendly relations with the Rouran Khaganate with a view to keeping Northern Wei under control. After securing peace with the Rourans, Jangsu invaded the Khitans, a branch of the Xianbei confederacy at the time, and then attacked the Didouyu with his Rouran allies.

After the Khitans surrendered to Goguryeo, Jangsu sent gifts to both Northern Wei and Southern Qi, which took over the southern half of China after overthrowing Liu Song in 479. Both Qi and Wei tried to tighten Goguryeo's relationship with them. Wei emperors treated Goguryeo delegates as equal to Chinese delegates. Under the reign of Emperor Xiaowen alone, 41 emissaries were sent, but the frequency started to drop since Jangsu continued to keep hospitality with Qi. This decrease in exchanged delegates outraged Emperor Xiaowen, and at last he gave an order to capture Goguryeo delegates before they could reach the Qi capital. However, Jangsu paid no mind, and continued to send delegates to Qi. Northern Wei could not block Goguryeo, which indicated the success of Jangsu's diplomatic strategy: maximizing the situation and manipulating the power struggles between rival Chinese states to Goguryeo's advantage.

Goguryeo and the northern states maintained peace and did not have further conflicts until the Goguryeo–Sui War in 598.

== Relations with southern Korean states ==
=== Marriage alliances ===
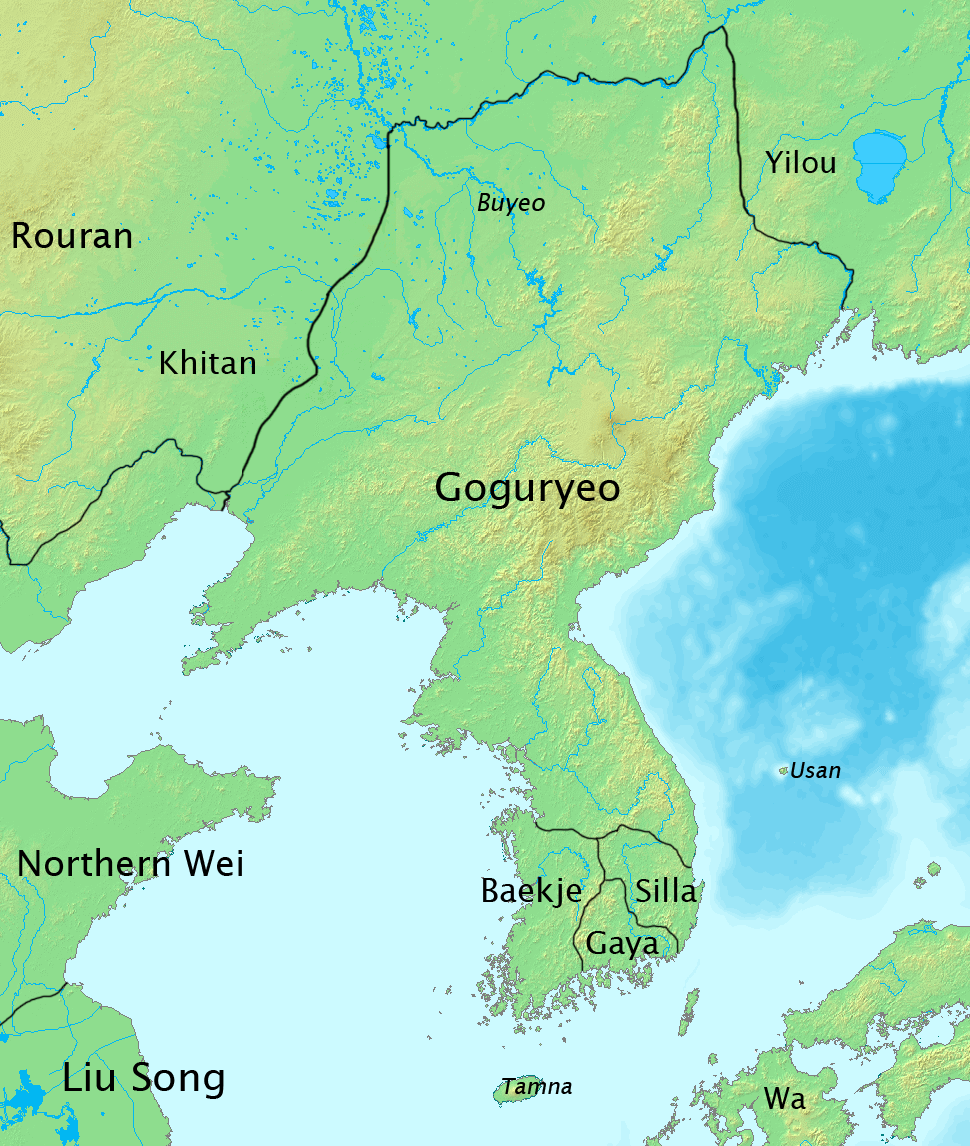
Goguryeo at its zenith c. 476.

Confronted with harsh attacks from Goguryeo into the southern region of the Korean Peninsula, Baekje and Silla found their survival through marriage alliances, beginning in 433. The alliance between Baekje and Silla lasted more than a century and was the primary reason why Goguryeo was unable to conquer the entire peninsula.

=== Gaya ===
Gaya found itself in a precarious situation due to its geographical disadvantage of being sandwiched by Baekje and Silla, and ultimately could not develop into an advanced nation.

=== Baekje campaign and Dorim ===
In 472, Gaero, the ruler of Baekje, sent a letter to the emperor of Northern Wei, stating that he was having trouble interacting with him due to frequent Goguryeo intervention, thus calling for military action against Goguryeo. However, Baekje failed to get its emissary back and was unable to receive the military support of Northern Wei. In response, Jangsu secretly planned to attack Baekje, which despite its losses against Gwanggaeto the Great, still held a significant power base in the Korean Peninsula. In order to disarm Baekje, he sent a Buddhist monk named Dorim, who went to Gaero's court with the secret objective of corrupting the country. Gaero began to favor Dorim, playing baduk with him every day, and Dorim was able to talk Gaero into spending large sums of money on construction projects, weakening the national treasury.

In 475, Jangsu launched a full-scale invasion from both land and sea against the now politically unstable kingdom of Baekje. Dorim was successful in gaining information about Baekje, and consequently Gaero was not at all prepared for the assault formulated by Jangsu. With momentum now in his favor, Jangsu then proceeded toward the capital and easily captured the city of Wiryeseong and slew Gaero. Soon after, Jangsu burned the capital to the ground, along with several other cities that he conquered from Baekje. Henceforth, Baekje had no choice but to move its capital to mountainous Ungjin (present-day Gongju), 80 miles to the south, which provided a natural protection for the devastated kingdom. The war gave Goguryeo more or less total control of the Han River valley, the region essential to commercial and military power in the Korean peninsula. Baekje had been a dominant power on the peninsula for hundreds of years thanks to its control of the region, but after losing the region to Goguryeo, Baekje also lost control of the peninsula.

=== Silla campaign ===
After successfully concluding his campaign in Baekje, Jangsu then turned his attention toward the second peninsular kingdom of Silla. Silla had been a vassal state of Goguryeo since Gwanggaeto defeated the Baekje and Wa troops invading Silla in 400. To secure the allegiance of his de facto protectorate, Jangsu demanded the younger brother of King Nulji of Silla to become a political hostage. King Nulji broke off relations with Goguryeo in 454. Jangsu invaded Silla in 468, expanding his domain into parts of Gangwon Province, and again in 489, capturing 7 walled cities and expanding his domain into parts of North Gyeongsang Province. With his victory over Silla, Jangsu erected a stone monument in present-day Chungju, praising the accomplishments of his father and himself. This monument remains at the same site, holding historical importance as the only surviving Goguryeo stele in the Korean peninsula.

== Death and legacy ==
King Jangsu died in 491, at the age of 97. His temple name means "Long Life" in hanja. During his reign, Goguryeo was at its golden age, stretching from Inner Mongolia to the current North Chungcheong Province of South Korea, south of the Han River basin.

== Modern depictions ==
Age of Empires: World Domination, a mobile game produced in collaboration with series owner Microsoft, includes Jangsu as a selectable hero of the Korean civilization.

Portrayed by Jung Yoon-seok in the 2007 MBC TV series The Legend.

== See also ==
- History of Korea
- Three Kingdoms of Korea
- List of Korean monarchs

Jangsu of Goguryeo House of Go Born: 394 Died: 491
Regnal titles
Preceded by Gwanggaeto the Great	Monarch of Goguryeo; 412–491	Succeeded by Munjamyeong
