= Sosurim of Goguryeo =

17th King of Goguryeo (r. 371–384)

Sosurim 소수림
- Taewang

King of Goguryeo
- Reign: 16 November 371 – November 384 A.D.
- Coronation: 16 November 371 A.D.
- Predecessor: Gogugwon
- Successor: Gogugyang

Crown Prince of Goguryeo
- Reign: January 355 – 23 October 371 A.D.
- Coronation: January 355 A.D.
- Predecessor: Sayu
- Successor: Damdeok
- Born: Go Gubu; Unknown; Gungnae Seong
- Died: November 384 A.D. Gungnae Seong
- Burial: Sosurim Won
Regnal name
- Sohaejuryu Taewang; Haemiryu Taewang
Posthumous name
- Sosurim Taewang
- House: Go
- Dynasty: Goguryeo
- Father: Gogugwon
- Occupation: King

- Sosurim of Goguryeo
- Hangul: 고구부
- Hanja: 高丘夫
- RR: Go Gubu
- MR: Ko Kubu

Monarch name
- Hangul: 소수림왕, 소해주류왕, 해미류왕
- Hanja: 小獸林王, 小解朱留王, 解味留王
- RR: Sosurimwang, Sohaejuryuwang, Haemiryuwang
- MR: Sosurimwang, Sohaejuryuwang, Haemiryuwang

King Sosurim (died 384) (r. 371–384) was the 17th ruler of Goguryeo, the northernmost of the Three Kingdoms of Korea. He was the son of King Gogugwon.

== Family ==
- Father: King Gogukwon (고국원왕; 故國原王)
  - Grandfather: King Micheon (미천왕; 美川王)
  - Grandmother: Queen, of the Ju clan (왕후 주씨; 王后 周氏)
- Unknown wife – No issue.

== Background and Rise to the throne ==
Born as Go Gu-Bu, King Sosurim was the first son and successor of King Gogugwon. He assisted his father in leading the country and strengthening royal authority, which had been severely weakened due to humiliation brought upon by the Later Yan, who dug up the grave of King Micheon. Prince Gu-Bu was made crown prince in 355.

== Reign ==
He became king in 371 when his father King Gogugwon was killed by the Baekje King Geunchogo's assault on Pyongyang Castle.

Sosurim is considered to have strengthened the centralization of authority in Goguryeo, by establishing state religious institutions to transcend tribal factionalism. The development of centralized government system was largely attributed to reconciliation policy of Sosurim with its southern opponent, Baekje. In 372, he received Buddhism through travelling monks of Former Qin and built temples to house them. It is said the king of Former Qin during Sixteen Kingdoms period sent Monk Sundo with images and scriptures of Buddha and; Monk Ado, native Goguryeo returned two years later. Under full-pledged support of royal family, it is said the first temple, Heungguk monastery of Korean kingdoms was supposedly constructed around the capital. Though there are several evidences that Buddhism was established before the year of 372 such as mid-4th century mausoleum styles under the Buddhist influence, it is well accepted that Sosurim consolidated Buddhist footprints not only on Korean people's spiritual world but also in terms of bureaucracy systems and ideology.

The year 372 held its critical importance in Korean history not only for Buddhism but also for Confucianism and Daoism. Sosurim also established the Confucian institutions of Taehak (태학; 太學) to educate the children of the nobility. In 373, he promulgated a code of laws called (율령; 律令) which stimulated the institutionalized law systems including penal codes and codified regional customs.

In 374, 375, and 376, he attacked the Korean kingdom of Baekje to the south, and in 378 was attacked by the Khitan from the north. He died in 384 and was buried in Sosurim, which was probably a forest around its second capital, Gungnae.

== Legacy ==
Most of King Sosurim's reign and life was spent trying to keep Goguryeo under control and also strengthening royal authority. Although he was not able to avenge the death of his father and previous Goguryeo ruler, King Gogugwon, he did play a major role in setting up the foundations that made the great conquests of his nephew and later ruler of Goguryeo, King Gwanggaeto the Great achieve reckless subjugations.

== Depiction in arts and media ==
- Portrayed by Jun Sung-hwan in the 2007 MBC TV series The Legend.
- Portrayed by Jin Sung and Jung Yoon-seok in the 2010–2011 KBS TV series The King of Legend.

== See also ==
- History of Korea
- Three Kingdoms of Korea
- List of Korean monarchs

Sosurim of Goguryeo House of Go Died: 384
Regnal titles
Preceded by Gogugwon	King of Goguryeo; 371–384	Succeeded by Gogugyang
