= Anak Tomb No. 3 =

Chamber tomb in North Korea

Coordinates: 38°26′57″N 125°30′29″E

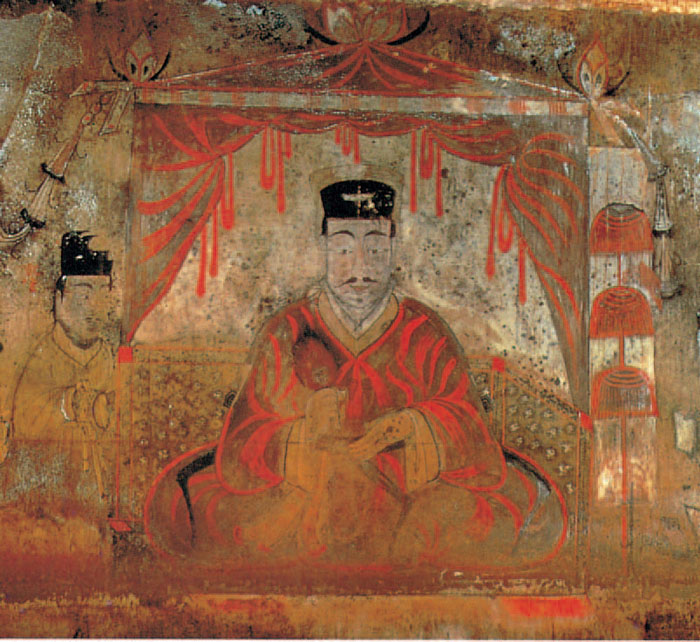

Korean name
- Hangul: 안악삼호무덤
- Hanja: 安岳三號墳
- RR: Anak samho mudeom
- MR: Anak samho mudŏm

Anak Tomb No. 3 is a chamber tomb of Goguryeo located in Anak, South Hwanghae, North Korea. It is known for mural paintings and an epitaph. It is part of the Complex of Koguryo Tombs.

The identity of the tomb's owner is disputed due to an epitaph in the tomb bearing the name of Dong Shou, a former general of the Xianbei Murong clan in Liaodong who fled political turmoil to Goguryeo. The epitaph lists Dong Shou's various titles as well as uses the defunct Eastern Jin dynasty's era name, suggesting that Dong Shou is the tomb's owner. As a result, some scholars believe that the tomb belonged to Dong Shou while others argue that it belonged to the Goguryeo king Micheon or his son Gogugwon.

== History ==
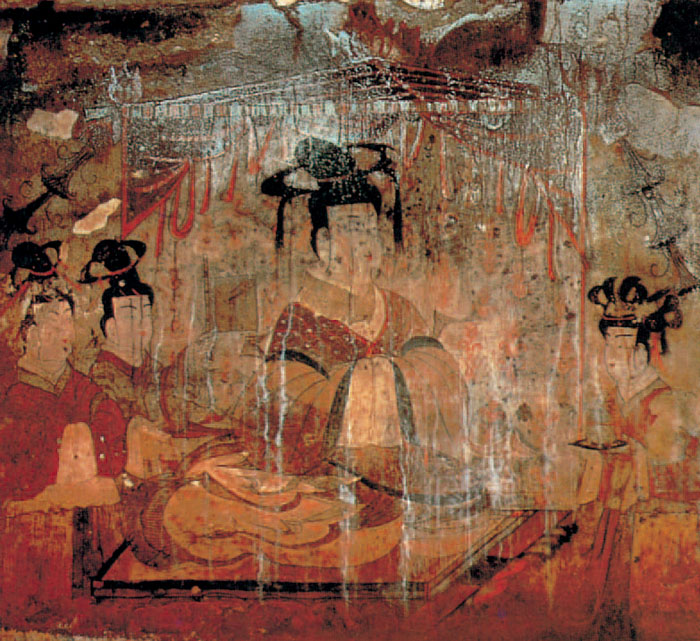
Woman (wife of the owner)

Anak Tomb 3 is the oldest and most significant painted tomb made of stone in the area. It is located on a small hillock in Yongsun, Anak, in South Hwanghae Province, North Korea. This stone tomb was first analyzed by the Korean archaeologist Toh Yu-ho (1905-1982) in 1946. It is composed of five rooms arranged in asymmetrical order, each containing a "lantern ceiling" originating from West Asia and commonly found in China. The rooms are laid out along a south-north axis followed by the main burial chamber with narrow galleries on its eastern and northern sides. By the time Toh Yu-ho surveyed the tomb, it had already been disturbed, although the murals and a few inscriptions had survived.

== Epitaph ==
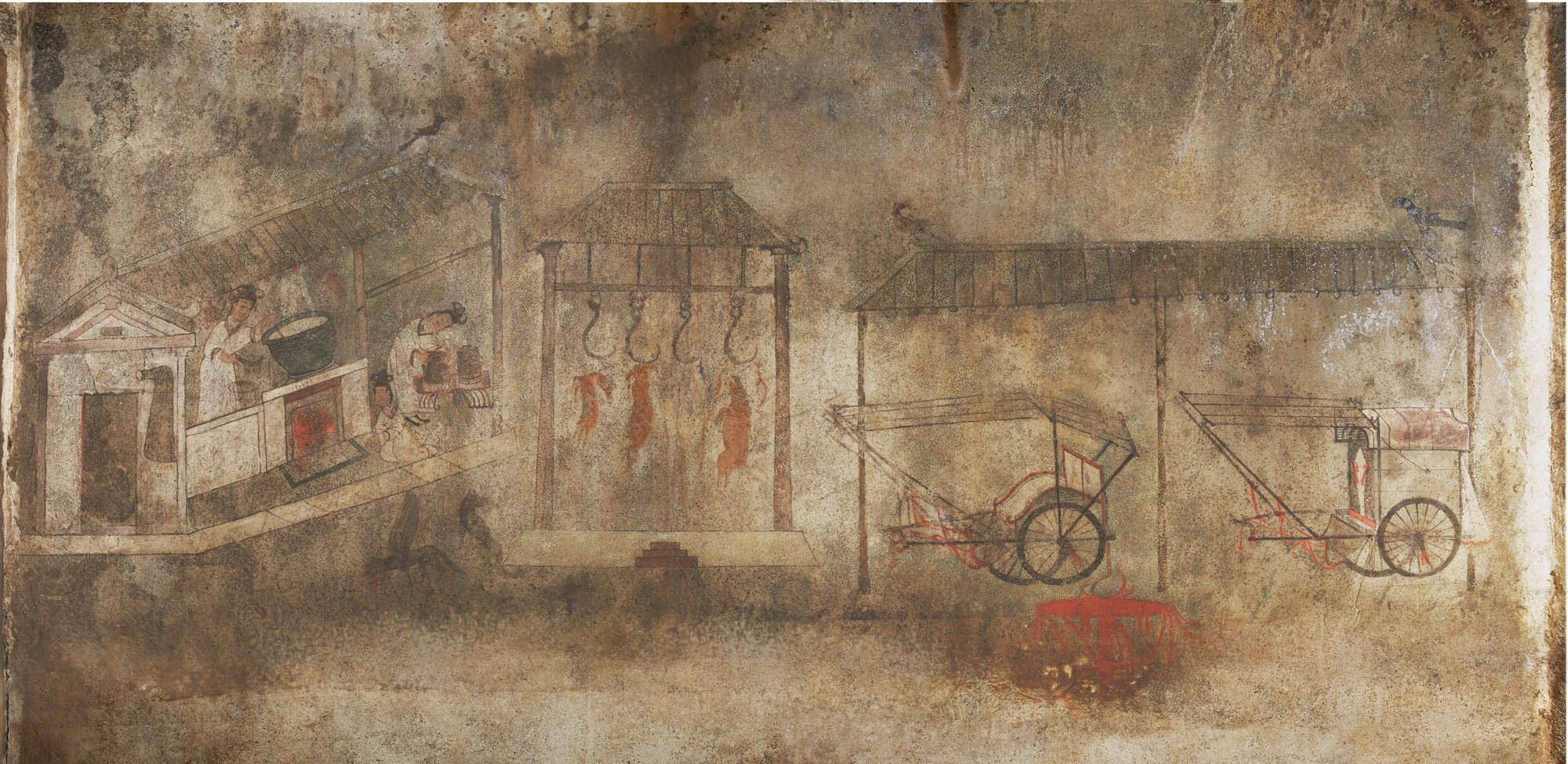
Indoor Life Painting

Anak Tomb 3 is one of the few Goguryeo tombs with epitaphs identifying their date. Among the surviving inscriptions, the most extensive piece is an ink epitaph located above a door guardian standing on the left wall leading to the western chamber. The inscription is 68 characters long, arranged in seven lines, and written in regular script with some traces of clerical script. The writing follows a Chinese template and remarks upon the life of a certain Dong Shou (289-357), his birthplace in Pingguo Prefecture (modern Gaizhou in Liaoning), and his age at the time of death. The inscription of Dong Shou states that he was originally a general of the Xianbei Murong clan in Liaodong (modern Liaoning, China). In 336, Dong Shou's master, Murong Ren, was killed by his brother Murong Huang (founder of Former Yan) in a struggle for power. Dong Shou fled to Goguryeo and was given a position in the former territory of the Lelang commandery.

The epitaph and its implication for the tomb's identity, especially whether or not it can be considered "Goguryeo", and therefore "Korean" rather than "Chinese", has been the subject of controversy. Due to the epitaph and its contents, some scholars generally regard this site as the tomb of Dong Shou.

According to Chinese scholar Yeh Pai, who deciphered the inscription in 1951, the Dong Shou the epitaph refers to is the same person who appeared in two Chinese histories, the Book of Jin and Zizhi Tongjian. That person was recorded to have fled from Xianbei invasions in Liaodong in 337. Yeh Pai's conclusions were accepted in the 1958 formal Korean report; however some Korean scholars still maintained that the tomb belongs to King Mi-chon. Some scholars such as K. H. J. Gardiner and Wonyong Kim believe this to be a Chinese tomb of excellent quality while North and other South Korean scholars believe that Dong Shou was an émigré official. Moreover, the quality of the paintings and the size of the tomb have been argued recently by Hwi-joon Ahn and Youngsook Pak to indicate that it is a royal tomb of Goguryeo.

However the theory that Dong Shou was an émigré official has been criticized by Minku Kim based on the language used in the epitaph. Minku Kim notes that the epitaph contains no hint of Dong Shou's servility, but rather tediously lists all his various titles: magistrate of Lelang, and governor of Changli, Xuantu, and Daifang commanderies. Minku Kim believes that not only is Anak Tomb 3 the tomb of Dong Shou, he ruled the region as his own personal domain independently from Goguryeo. This theory has been criticized by the pro-Goguryeo camp who argue that the titles were fabrications, that Goguryeo ruled the region of Changli, and that the epitaph did not indicate the tomb's occupant but rather the identity of the tomb guardian above which it is located. These counter-arguments have also been criticized by Minku Kim, who argues that for the epitaph to have listed fake titles, the tomb would have to have been constructed in secrecy without the knowledge of Goguryeo. Moreover it makes no sense for such an ornately constructed tomb to bear the name of Dong Shou in an epitaph but not his master. The premise that Goguryeo controlled Daifang Commandery during Dong Shou's time rests on a line from the 12th century text Samguk sagi which states that in 314, King Micheon attacked Daifang, but Minku Kim points out that such an action also applied to Xuantu Commandery, yet it is known that Xuantu survived the attack. Later events during Dong Shou's lifetime also points to a weakening of Goguryeo's control in the area. In 342, Murong Huang devastated Goguryeo and ransacked King Micheon's tomb. Micheon's corpse was taken back to Former Yan as ransom. In 355, Former Yan enfeoffed the Goguryeo king as duke of Lelang, the same tier of title that the epitaph claims for Dong Shou. The epitaph also uses the defunct Eastern Jin dynasty's regnal date (Yonghe), which suggests that Dong Shou's true loyalty was to his former regime.

Dong Shou's epitaph bears significant differences from the epitaph of a high ranking Chinese official named Zhen under the employ of Goguryeo. Discovered in 1976 at Tokhung-ri in Kangso, the painted stone tomb contains an inscribed date of 408. Unlike Dong Shou, Zhen uses a Goguryeo-style title as well as Goguryeo's reign date Yŏngnak (391–412), belonging to Gwanggaeto the Great. According to the epitaph, he was a regional inspector. The appearance of the man depicted in the tomb mural is also different from Dong Shou; he wears a red coat, holds a scepter, and is situated atop a dais by himself while receiving an audience from a group of delegates from Youzhou.

== Murals ==
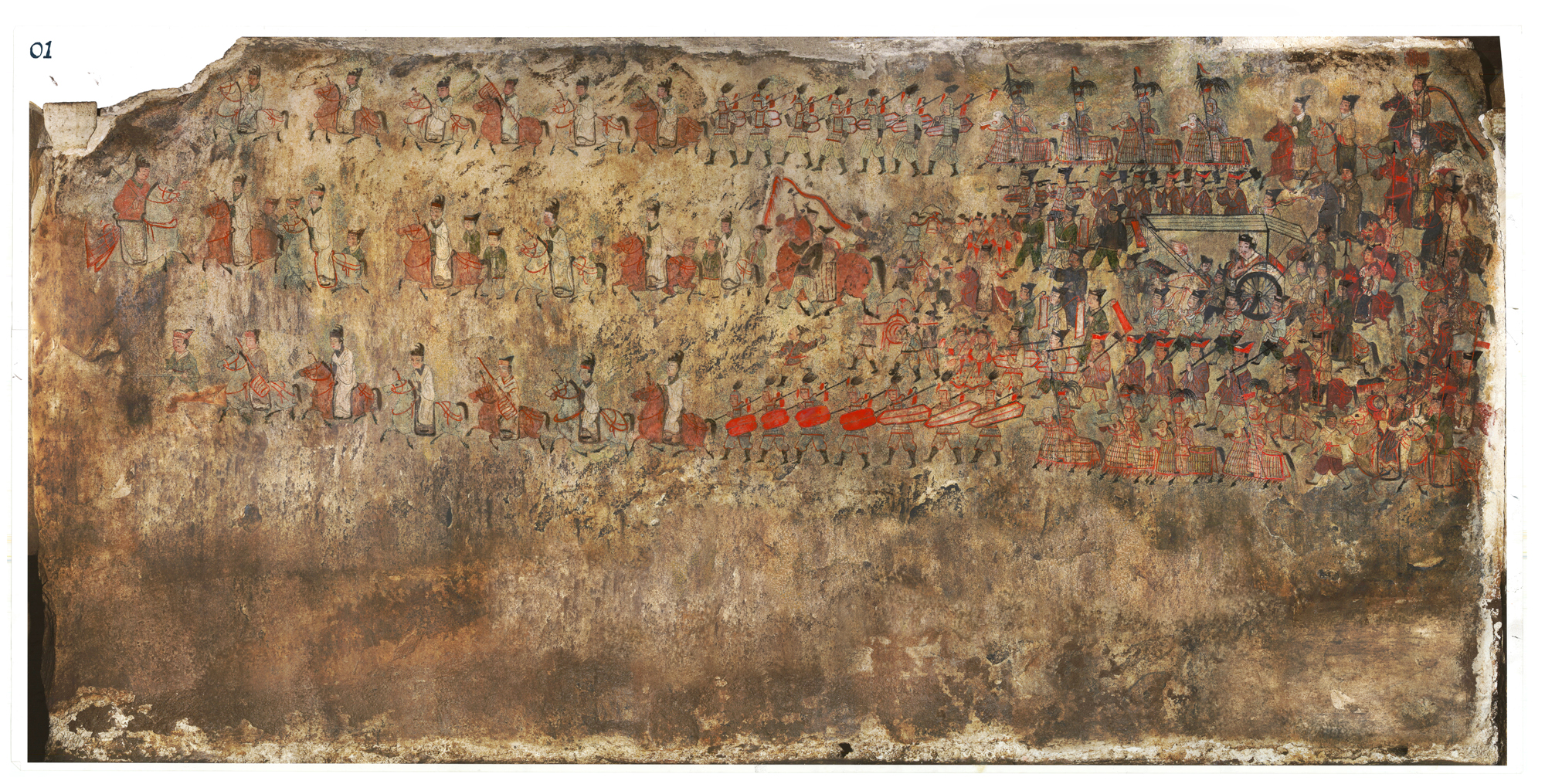
Procession Scene

Anak Tomb 3 contains multiple mural paintings which some believe offer insight to the life and hierarchy of Goguryeo people. There are two portraits, one on the front wall of the west side chamber and one on the southern wall, portraying a man and a woman, respectively. Scholars have disputed the owner of this tomb and thus the identity of people portrayed in these murals. Due to the epitaph's contents, many believe that the images depict Dong Shou, a refugee who fled the power struggles in Former Yan, and his wife, while others believe that the person depicted was the Goguryeo king, King Gogukwon.

The man in the mural is shown to be sitting upright and is flanked by other men who are smaller than him. He is dressed in red silk clothes with a white kwan over a black inner kwan and is staring straight out with an impersonal expression. The painting of the woman resides on the southern wall of the tomb, next to that of the man, and her sitting position is slightly turned in to face him. The woman also wears an impersonal expression, but with a notable face shape; her face, as well as the faces of the women who flank her, is round and full, different from the typical facial structure of the Goguryeo people, who had long and oval faces. The woman is wearing a Chinese set of attire called guiyi, which is a multi-lap swallow-tail clothing, reflecting Chinese influence on the tomb and may indicate the clothing style worn in the Chinese Six Dynasties. The woman's hairstyle is identical to the hairstyle in Northern Wei. According to Minku Kim, this type of mortuary portrait painting displayed in Anak Tomb 3 is atypical of Goguryeo tombs, which show more adaptation of Chinese influences to local styles.

Others believe the mural scene depicts Goguryeo people. The next mural in this tomb is a procession scene and resides in the corridor. It contains 250 people, including the owner of the tomb who is sitting in a cow-pulled wagon. Other Goguryeo people displayed in this mural include members of a marching band, flag bearers, maids and civil officials. The large number of people suggests the high social status of the owner. It is also important to note the seemingly identical, impersonal facial structure of the people included in this scene. This can be attributed to the fact that at the time when this mural was developed, the expression of individuality was not yet a developed technique in Goguryeo paintings. The inside of the eastern chamber contains a colorful mural illustrating the typical life of the Goguryeo people. The scene includes a kitchen, a meat storage room, a barn, a carriage shed, and household staff, along with other commonplace features.

== Architecture ==
Anak Tomb 3 is built of stone in an asymmetrical plan spanning five rooms. Each room has a "lantern ceiling", a type of architecture found widely in China and West Asia. The five rooms are arranged in a long south-north axis from the entryway, followed by the front chamber, two flanking "ear-chambers" by its sides, and the main burial chamber.

According to Minku Kim, the construction of the tomb is unusual for Goguryeo and points to a non-indigenous origin. Anak Tomb No. 3 is the first tomb in the mid-Yalu region to have intricate stone chambers. Prior to 357, the date of Dong Shou's death, the native custom was to build graves out of piled up cairns, sometimes forming pyramid-like megalithic structures. The appearance of fully stone chambered tombs is associated with the sinicization of Goguryeo. Even after the adoption of stone chambers, indigenous Goguryeo tombs in the same region were different from Anak Tomb No. 3 in their orientation. Indigenous Goguryeo tombs to the north of the Yalu are oriented to the southwest whereas Anak Tomb No. 3 and other tombs in the more heavily Chinese-influenced region are oriented in the cardinal south-north directions, indicating a major difference in their owners' conception of the afterlife.

== See also ==
- Korean art
- Korean history
- Three Kingdoms of Korea

== Bibliography ==
- Kim, Minku (2020), Early Paintings of Korea, Wiley Blackwell
- Okazaki Takashi (岡崎敬), Anagaku sangōhun (Tō Ju bo) no kenkyū (安岳三号墳 (冬寿墓) の研究), Shien (史淵), No.93, pp. 37–84, 1964.
- Takeda Yukio (武田幸男), Kyūryōiki no shihai keitai (旧領域の支配形態), Kōkuri shi to Higashi Ajia (高句麗史と東アジア), pp. 78–107, 1989.
