= Gwanggaeto the Great =

19th King of Goguryeo (r. 391–413)

- Taewang
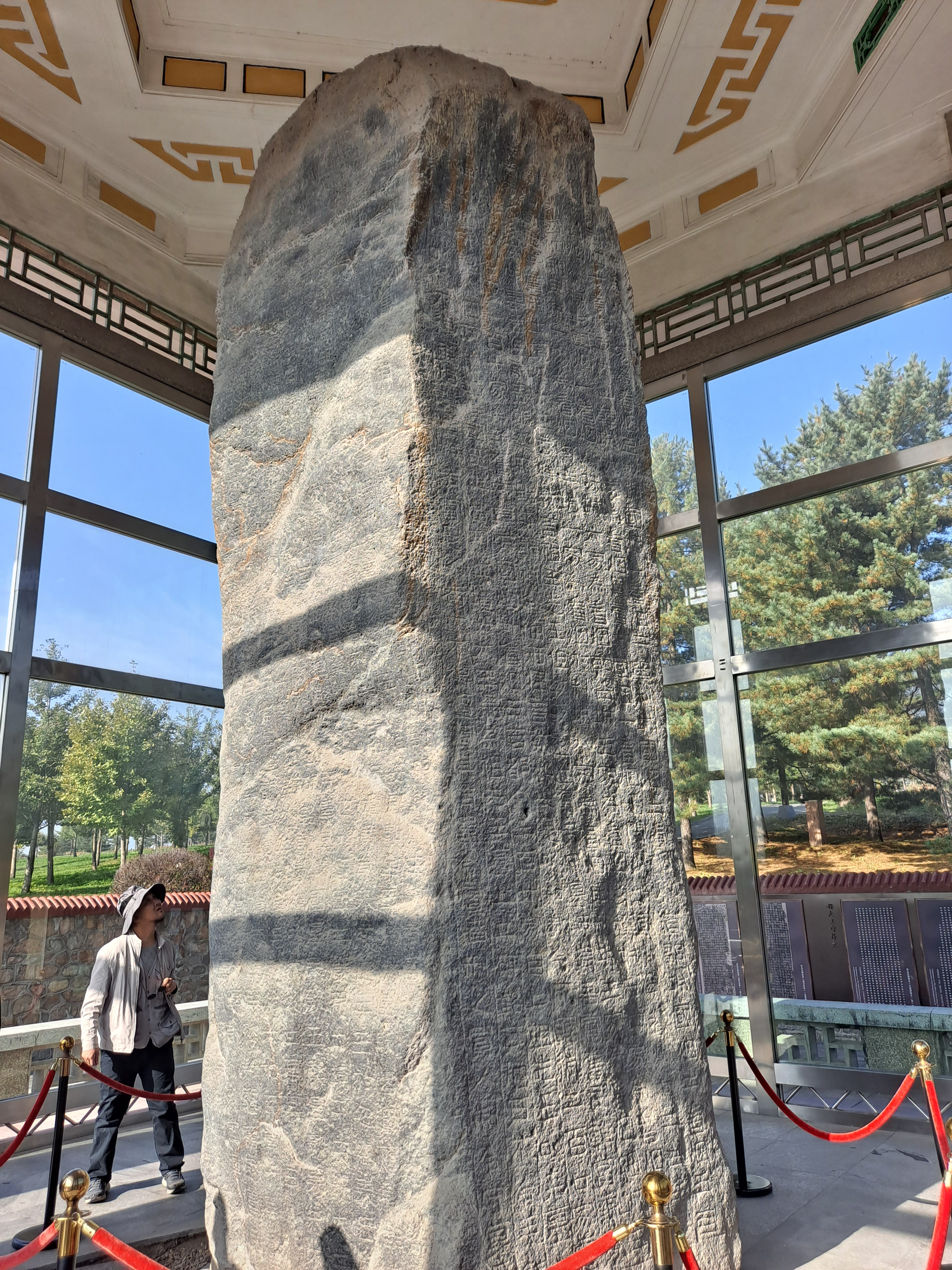
- Gwanggaeto Stele

King of Goguryeo
- Reign: May 391 – October 412
- Coronation: May 391
- Predecessor: Gogugyang
- Successor: Jangsu

Crown Prince of Goguryeo
- Reign: January 386 – May 391
- Coronation: January 386
- Predecessor: Gubu
- Successor: Georyeon
- Born: Go Damdeok; 374; Gungnae Seong
- Died: 412 (aged 37–38); Gungnae Seong
- Issue: Georyeon
Regnal name
- Yeongnak
Posthumous name
- Gukgangsang-gwanggaetogyeong-pyeongan-hotaewang
- House: Go
- Dynasty: Goguryeo
- Father: Gogugyang
- Occupation: King

Korean name
- Hangul: 광개토대왕
- Hanja: 廣開土大王
- RR: Gwanggaeto daewang
- MR: Kwanggaet'o taewang
- IPA: [kwaŋ.ɡɛ.tʰo.dɛ.waŋ]

Birth name
- Hangul: 고담덕
- Hanja: 高談德
- RR: Go Damdeok
- MR: Ko Tamdŏk
- IPA: [ko.dam.dʌk̚]

Posthumous name
- Hangul: 국강상광개토경평안호태왕
- Hanja: 國岡上廣開土境平安好太王
- RR: Gukgangsang gwanggaetogyeong pyeongan hotaewang
- MR: Kukkangsang kwanggaet'ogyŏng p'yŏngan hot'aewang

Gwanggaeto the Great (374–412, r. 391–412) was the nineteenth monarch of Goguryeo. His full posthumous name means "Entombed in Gukgangsang, Broad Expander of Domain, Peacemaker, Supreme King", sometimes abbreviated to Hotaewang. His era name is Yeongnak and he is occasionally recorded as Yeongnak Taewang ("Great King" or "Emperor" Yeongnak). Gwanggaeto's imperial reign title meant that Goguryeo was on equal standing as an empire with the imperial dynasties in China.

Under Gwanggaeto, Goguryeo began a golden age, becoming a powerful empire and one of the great powers in East Asia. Gwanggaeto made enormous advances and conquests into: Western Manchuria against Khitan tribes; Inner Mongolia and the Maritime Province of Russia against numerous nations and tribes; and the Han River valley in central Korea to control over two-thirds of the Korean Peninsula.

In regard to the Korean Peninsula, Gwanggaeto defeated Baekje, the then most powerful of the Three Kingdoms of Korea, in 396, capturing the capital city of Wiryeseong in present-day Seoul. In 399, Silla, the southeastern kingdom of Korea, sought aid from Goguryeo due to incursions by Baekje troops and their Wa allies from the Japanese archipelago. Gwanggaeto dispatched 50,000 expeditionary troops, crushing his enemies and securing Silla as a de facto protectorate; he thus subdued the other Korean kingdoms and achieved a loose unification of the Korean peninsula under Goguryeo. In his western campaigns, he defeated the Xianbei of the Later Yan empire and conquered the Liaodong peninsula, regaining the ancient domain of Gojoseon.

Gwanggaeto's accomplishments are recorded on the Gwanggaeto Stele, erected in 414 at the supposed site of his tomb in Ji'an along the present-day China–North Korea border. Constructed by his son and successor Jangsu, the monument to Gwanggaeto the Great is the largest engraved stele in the world.

== Family ==
- Father: King Gogukyang (고국양왕; 故國壤王)
  - Grandfather: King Gogukwon (고국원왕; 故國原王)
- Unknown wife
  - Son: Prince Georyeon (거련; 巨連)
  - Unknown son; father of Go Seung-cheon (고승천; 高升千).

== Birth and background ==
At the time of Gwanggaeto's birth, Goguryeo was not as powerful as it once had been. In 371, three years prior to Gwanggaeto's birth, the rival Korean kingdom of Baekje, under the great leadership of Geunchogo, soundly defeated Goguryeo, slaying the monarch Gogukwon and sacking Pyongyang. Baekje became one of the dominant powers in East Asia. Baekje's influence was not limited to the Korean peninsula, but extended across the sea to Liaoxi and Shandong in China, taking advantage of the weakened state of Former Qin, and Kyushu in the Japanese archipelago. Goguryeo was inclined to avoid conflicts with its ominous neighbor, while cultivating constructive relations with the Former Qin, the Xianbei, and the Rouran, in order to defend itself from future invasions and to bide time to reshape its legal structure and to initiate military reforms.

Gogukwon's successor, Sosurim, adopted a foreign policy of appeasement and reconciliation with Baekje, and concentrated on domestic policies to spread Buddhism throughout Goguryeo's social and political systems. Furthermore, due to the defeats that Goguryeo had suffered at the hands of Baekje as well as the proto-Mongol Xianbei, Sosurim instituted military reforms aimed at preventing such defeats in the future. Sosurim's internal arrangements laid the groundwork for Gwanggaeto's expansion.

Sosurim's successor, Gogukyang, invaded Later Yan, the successor state of Former Yan, in 385 and Baekje in 386.

== Reign ==
=== Rise to power and campaigns against Baekje ===
Gwanggaeto succeeded his father, Gogukyang, upon Gogukyang's death in 391. Upon Gwanggaeto's coronation, Gwanggaeto adopted the era name Yeongnak (Eternal Rejoicing) and the title Taewang (Supreme King), which was equivalent to "emperor", affirming that he was an equal to the Imperial rulers of China.

In 392, Gwanggaeto led an attack on Baekje with 40,000 troops, capturing 10 walled cities. In response, Asin, the monarch of Baekje, launched a counterattack on Goguryeo in 393 but was defeated. Despite the ongoing war, during 393, Gwanggaeto established 9 Buddhist temples in Pyongyang. Asin invaded Goguryeo once more in 394, but was defeated again. After suffering multiple defeats against Goguryeo, Baekje's political stability began to crumble. In 395, Baekje was defeated once more by Goguryeo and was pushed south to its capital of Wiryeseong on the Han River. In the following year, in 396, Gwanggaeto led an assault on Wiryeseong by land and sea, using the Han River, and triumphed over Baekje. Gwanggaeto captured the Baekje capital and the defeated Asin submitted to him, surrendering a prince and 10 government ministers.

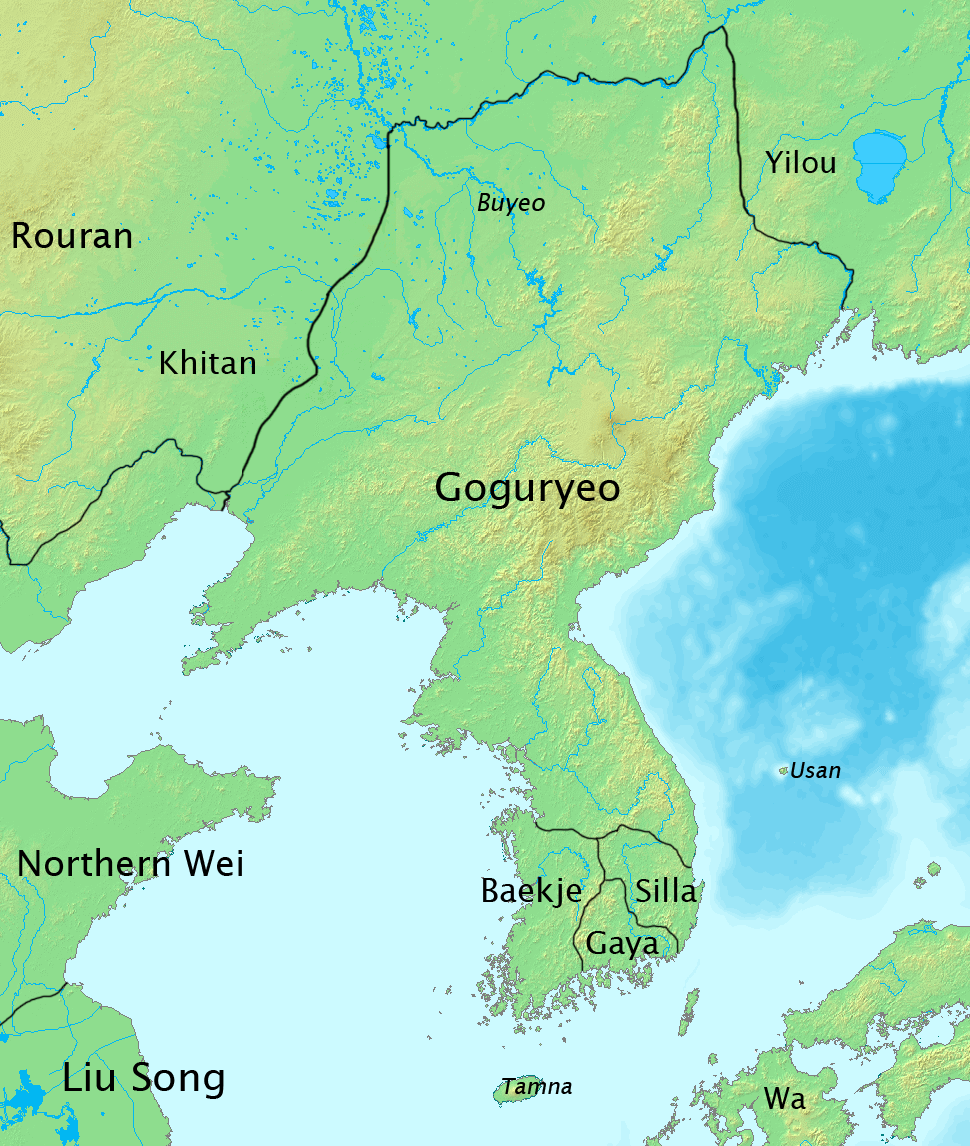
Goguryeo at zenith under Gwanggaeto and Jangsu.

=== Northern conquests ===
In 395, while his campaign against Baekje was ongoing to the south, Gwanggaeto made an excursion to invade the Khitan Baili clan to the west on the Liao River, destroying 3 tribes and 600 to 700 camps. In 398, Gwanggaeto conquered the Sushen people to the northeast, who were Tungusic ancestors of the Jurchens and Manchus.

In 400, while Gwanggaeto was occupied with Baekje, Gaya, and Wa troops in Silla, the Xianbei state of Later Yan, founded by the Murong clan in present-day Liaoning, attacked Goguryeo. Gwanggaeto repulsed the Xianbei troops. In 402, Gwanggaeto retaliated and conquered the prominent fortress called 宿軍城 near the capital of Later Yan. In 405 and again in 406, Later Yan troops attacked Goguryeo fortresses in Liaodong (遼東城 in 405, and 木底城 in 406), but were defeated both times. Gwanggaeto conquered all of Liaodong. By conquering Liaodong, Gwanggaeto recovered the ancient domain of Gojoseon; Goguryeo controlled Liaodong until the mid-late 7th century.

In 407, Gwanggaeto dispatched 50,000 troops consisting of infantry and cavalry and won a great victory, completely annihilating the enemy troops and pillaging about 10,000 armors and countless war supplies; the opponent can be interpreted as Later Yan, Baekje, or Wa.

In 410, Gwanggaeto attacked Eastern Buyeo to the northeast.

=== Southern campaigns ===
In 400, Silla, another Korean kingdom in the southeast of the Korean peninsula, requested aid from Goguryeo in repelling an allied invasion by Baekje, Gaya, and Wa. Gwanggaeto dispatched 50,000 troops and annihilated the enemy coalition. Thereupon, Gwanggaeto influenced Silla as a suzerain, and Gaya declined and never recovered. In 402, Gwanggaeto returned Prince Silseong, who had resided in Goguryeo as a political hostage since 392, back home to Silla and appointed him as the king of Silla.

In 404, Gwanggaeto defeated an attack by the Wa from the Japanese archipelago on the southern border of what was once the Daifang commandery, inflicting enormous casualties on the enemy.

== Death and legacy ==
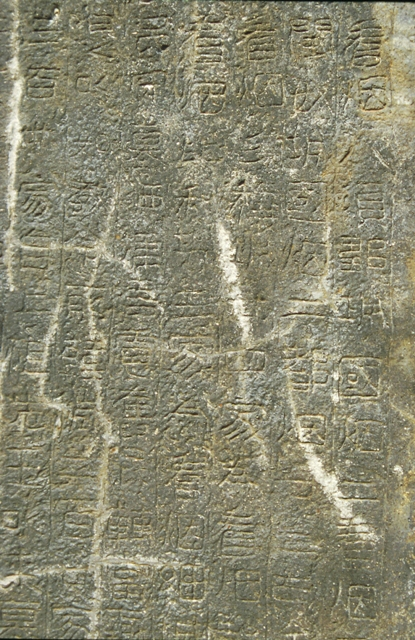
Detail of Gwanggaeto Stele

Gwanggaeto died of an unknown illness in 412 at the age of 38. He was succeeded by his eldest son, Jangsu, who ruled Goguryeo for 79 years until the age of 97, the longest reign in East Asian history.

Gwanggaeto's conquests are said to mark the zenith of Korean history, building and consolidating a great empire in Northeast Asia and uniting the Three Kingdoms of Korea under his influence. Gwanggaeto conquered 64 walled cities and 1,400 villages. Except for the period of 200 years beginning with Jangsu, who would build upon his father's domain, and the golden age of Balhae, Korea never before or since ruled such a vast territory. There is archaeological evidence that Goguryeo's maximum extent lay even further west in present-day Mongolia, based on discoveries of Goguryeo fortress ruins in Mongolia. Gwanggaeto established his own era name, Yeongnak Eternal Rejoicing, proclaiming Goguryeo monarchs equal to their counterparts in China.

Gwanggaeto the Great is one of two rulers of Korea whose names are appended with the title "the Great", with the other being Sejong the Great of Joseon, who created Hangul the Korean alphabet, to promote literacy among the common people, and made great advances in science.

Gwanggaeto is regarded by Koreans as one of the greatest heroes in Korean history, and is often taken as a potent symbol of Korean nationalism.

The Gwanggaeto Stele, a 6.39-meter-tall (21.0 ft) monument erected by Jangsu in 414, was rediscovered in the late 19th century. The stele was inscribed with information about Gwanggaeto's reign and achievements, but not all the characters and passages have been preserved. Korean and Japanese scholars disagree on the interpretation in regard to passages on the Wa.

The Republic of Korea Navy operates Gwanggaeto the Great-class destroyers, built by Daewoo Heavy Industries and named in honor of the monarch.

A prominent statue of Gwanggaeto alongside a replica of the Gwanggaeto Stele were erected in the main street of Guri in Gyeonggi Province.

== Depiction in arts and media ==
=== Film and television ===
- Portrayed by Yoo Seung-ho and Bae Yong-joon in the 2007 MBC TV series The Legend.
- Portrayed by Lee Tae-gon in the 2011–2012 KBS1 TV series Gwanggaeto, The Great Conqueror.
- Portrayed by Lee Do-yeob in the 2017 KBS1 docudrama Chronicles of Korea.

=== Literature ===
Many novels, comics, and games about Gwanggaeto the Great have been released in South Korea.

=== Games ===
The popular and award-winning Korean mobile game Hero for Kakao features Gwanggaeto as a playable character.

Age of Empires: World Domination, a mobile game produced in collaboration with series owner Microsoft, includes Gwanggaeto as a selectable hero of the Korean civilization.

=== Others ===
The International Taekwon-Do Federation created a pattern, or teul, to honor Gwanggaeto the Great. The pattern's diagram represents Gwanggaeto's territorial expansion and recovery of lost territories, and the 39 movements represent the first two numbers of 391 AD, the year when Gwanggaeto came to the throne.

== See also ==
- History of Korea
- Three Kingdoms of Korea
- List of Korean monarchs

Gwanggaeto the Great House of Go Born: 374 Died: 412
Regnal titles
Preceded by Gogugyang	Great King of Goguryeo; 391–412	Succeeded by Jangsu
