= Gogugwon of Goguryeo =

16th King of Goguryeo (r. 331–371)

Gogugwon
- Taewang
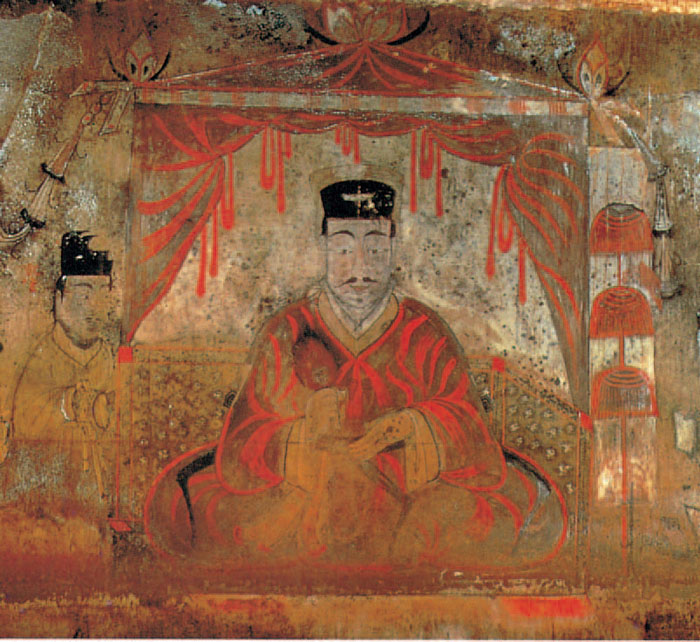
- Man from Anak Tomb No.3, presumed to be a depiction of king Gogugwon in North Korean academia.

King of Goguryeo
- Reign: February 331 – 16 November 372 A.D.
- Coronation: February 331 A.D.
- Predecessor: Micheon
- Successor: Sosurim

Crown Prince of Goguryeo
- Crown Prince: January 314 – February 331 A.D.
- Coronation: January 314 A.D.
- Predecessor: Sangbu
- Successor: Gubu
- Born: Go Sayu/Yu/Soe; Unknown; Gungnae Seong
- Died: 16 November 371 A.D. Pyongyang Seong
- Burial: Gogugwon
- Issue: Gubu; Iryeon
Regnal name
- Guggangsang Taewang
Posthumous name
- Gogugwon Taewang
- House: Go
- Dynasty: Goguryeo
- Father: Micheon
- Mother: Lady Ju
- Occupation: King

- Gogugwon of Goguryeo
- Hangul: 고사유; 유; 쇠
- Hanja: 高斯由; 劉; 釗
- RR: Go Sayu; Yu; Soe
- MR: Ko Sayu; Yu; Soe

Monarch name
- Hangul: 고국원왕; 국강상왕
- Hanja: 故國原王, 國岡上王
- RR: Gogugwonwang; Gukgangsangwang
- MR: Kogugwŏnwang; Kukkangsangwang

King Gogugwon (?–371, r. 331–371) was the 16th king of Goguryeo, the northernmost of the Three Kingdoms of Korea. He was the son of King Micheon and Lady Ju.

Goguryeo faced devastation by the Murong Xianbei people who attacked Goguryeo. Hwando was destroyed again by them in 341. Buyeo was also destroyed by the Xianbei in 346.

The reign of Gogukwon suffered severely from continuous foreign invasions, not only those of Chinese forces including Xianbei but also of Baekje, southwestern part of Korean peninsula. Particularly, the Xianbei state of Former Yan invaded the capital in 342, capturing Queen Ju, the mother of Gogukwon and his concubines and also digging up the corpse of his father, Micheon. Since the capital was thoroughly destroyed, Gogukwon firstly constructed Guknae seong as an alternative fortress in northern sphere and temporarily moved the capital to Pyongyang, present-day capital of North Korea. While he could get back the corpse of his father, it took about 13 years for his mother to return to Goguryeo.

In 369, Gogukwon personally led expedition of more than 20,000 troops. Without success, Geunchogo's son Geungusu overtook, counterattacked and killed Gogugwon in battle, at Pyongyang Castle, the only ruler of Goguryeo to die on a battlefield. He was buried in Gogugwon.

== Family ==
- Father: King Micheon (미천왕; 美川王)
  - Grandfather: Prince Dolgo (돌고; 咄固)
- Mother: Queen, of the Ju clan (왕후 주씨; 王后 周氏)
- Wife: unknown queen
  - Son: Prince Gubu (구부; 丘夫)
  - Son: Prince Iryeon (이련; 伊連)

== Depiction in arts and media ==
- Portrayed by Lee Jong-won in the 2010–2011 KBS1 TV series The King of Legend.
- Portrayed in 2017 KBS TV series Chronicles of Korea.

== See also ==
- History of Korea
- Three Kingdoms of Korea
- List of Korean monarchs
- Goguryeo-Yan Wars

Gogugwon of Goguryeo House of Go Died: 371
Regnal titles
Preceded by Micheon	King of Goguryeo; 331–371	Succeeded by Sosurim
