= Didouyu =

The Didouyu (Chinese: 地豆于) or Didougan (Chinese: 地豆干) was a tribe during the 5th-century in western Manchuria. Their territory included the Tujue (Eastern Turk, on their west), the Rouran, and the Khitan (on their southeast). They were attacked by both Goguryeo and Rouran in 479, allied for this operation. In fear, a big part of Kithan fled southward to submit to Northern Wei. Didouyu were one of the northern branches of the Xianbei.

== Sources ==
- Xu Elina-Qian, Historical Development of the Pre-Dynastic Khitan, University of Helsinki, 2005. 273 pages. p.264
