= Micheon of Goguryeo =

15th King of Goguryeo (r. 300–331)

Micheon 미천
- Taewang
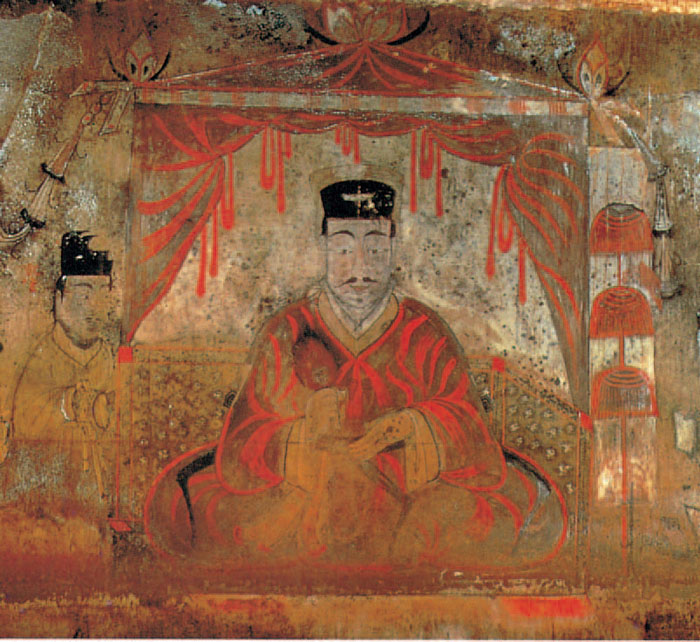
- Man from Anak Tomb No.3, presumed to be a depiction of king Micheon in North Korean academia.

King of Goguryeo
- Reign: September 300 – February 331 AD.
- Coronation: September 300 AD.
- Predecessor: Bongsang
- Successor: Gogugwon
- Born: Go Eul-bul/U-bul/Eulbulli; Unknown; Gungnae Seong
- Died: February 331 AD. Gungnae Seong
- Burial: Micheon Won
- Consort: Lady Ju
- Issue: Sayu; Mu
Regnal name
- Hoyang Taewang
Posthumous name
- Micheon Taewang
- House: Go
- Dynasty: Goguryeo
- Father: Go Dol-go
- Occupation: King

- Micheon of Goguryeo
- Hangul: 고을불; 을불리; 우불
- Hanja: 高乙弗; 乙弗利; 憂弗
- RR: Go Eulbul; Eulbulri; Ubul
- MR: Ko Ŭlbul; Ŭlbulli; Ubul

Monarch name
- Hangul: 미천왕; 호양왕
- Hanja: 美川王; 好壤王
- RR: Micheonwang; Hoyangwang
- MR: Mich'ŏnwang; Hoyangwang

King Micheon (died 331, r. 300–331) was the 15th ruler of Goguryeo, the northernmost of the Three Kingdoms of Korea.

== Background and rise to the throne ==
He was the grandson of the 13th king Seocheon, and the son of the gochuga Go Dol-go, who was killed by his brother, the 14th king Bongsang.

Korean historical records say that Micheon fled and hid as a servant in a miserable life, doing menial tasks such as throwing stones into a pond throughout the night to keep his master from being awakened. It is said a year later he left that house to become salt peddler but failed to gain huge asset. Meanwhile, King Bongsang became increasingly unpopular, and court officials, led by Prime Minister Ch'ang Chori, carried out a coup that overthrew King Bongsang, and placed King Micheon on the throne.

== Reign ==
Micheon continuously developed the Goguryeo army into a very powerful force. During the disintegration of China's Jin Dynasty, he expanded Goguryeo's borders into the Liaodong Peninsula and the other Chinese commanderies. Since the commanderies were nuisances to be eliminated for Goguryeo's stability, the first military campaign in 302 headed against the Xuantu Commandery, with conquering Daedong River basins of current Pyongyang. Consolidating cut-off between commanderies and China, Goguryeo also annexed the Lelang commandery in 313 and Daifang commandery in 314 after attacked Seoanpyeong (西安平; near modern Dandong) in Liaodong. The series of subjugation around northern Korean peninsula and Manchuria held its significance given that 400-year presence of Chinese forces was completely cleared out of Korean peninsula.

In his reign, Goguryeo was faced with growing Xianbei influence in the west, particularly the Murong tribe in Liaodong. Micheon allied with other Xianbei Duan and Yuwen tribes against the Murong, but their attack was unsuccessful. In 319, the Goguryeo general Yeo Noja (여노자; 如奴子) was taken captive by the Murong; in c.January 320, the Jin official Cui Bi sought refuge at Micheon's court. Throughout this period, Goguryeo and the Murong attacked each other's positions in Liaodong, but neither was able to secure regional hegemony. Since both sides were at stake, Micheon sent an ambassador to the Later Zhao dynasty in 330 with a view to making a diversion against the Murong.

== Death and aftermath ==
Micheon died and was buried in 331 at Micheon-won, literally the "garden with beautiful stream". Twelve years later, in the reign of King Gogugwon, his remains were dug up by the Former Yan invaders, and held for ransom.

== Family ==
- Father: Prince Dolgo (돌고; 咄固)
  - Grandfather: King Seocheon (서천왕; 西川王)
  - Grandmother: Queen, of the U clan (왕후 우씨; 王后 于氏)
- Wife: Queen, of the Ju clan (왕후 주씨; 王后 周氏); taken as a hostage alongside the king's corpse in 342 when Mo Yong-hwang (모용황) invaded Goguryeo until able to return in 355.
  - Son: Prince Sayu (Korean: 사유; Hanja: 斯由; d. 371)
  - Son: Prince Mu (무; 武)

== See also ==
- History of Korea
- Three Kingdoms of Korea
- List of Korean monarchs

Micheon of Goguryeo House of Go Died: 331
Regnal titles
Preceded by Bongsang	King of Goguryeo; 300–331	Succeeded by Gogugwon
