= Korean imperial titles =

Imperial titles in Korean history

Imperial titles were used in various historical Korean states before the 14th century and at the turn of the 20th century: Early Korean states used "great king", "greatest king", and "holy king"; later Korean states used "emperor". Korean monarchs who used imperial titles had political and religious authority over a realm or domain. The Chinese concept of tianxia, pronounced "cheonha" in Korean, was variously adopted and adapted to Korean views of the world from period to period.

== Three Kingdoms of Korea ==
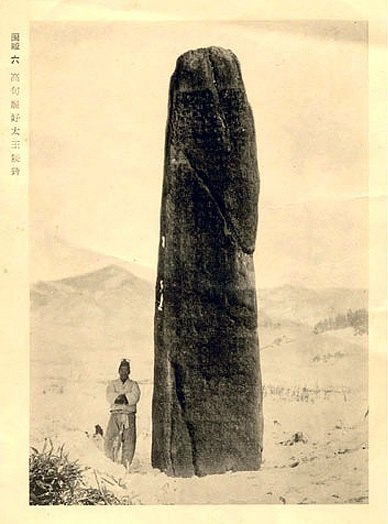
The Gwanggaeto Stele was erected in 414. It is the largest memorial stele in the world. This photograph of a Joseon man standing next to the Gwanggaeto Stele was published in 1903 in Japan in The Landmarks and Ruins of Joseon.

The 5th century was a period of great interaction on the Korean Peninsula that marked the first step toward the unification of the Three Kingdoms of Korea. The earliest known tianxia view of the world in Korean history is recorded in Goguryeo epigraphs dating to this period. (Note: The Chungju Goguryeo Monument may date earlier to c. 397, based on an inscription that says: "7th year of Yeongnak". Yeongnak is the era name of Gwanggaeto the Great. Goguryeo used its own era names.)

Dongmyeong of Goguryeo was a god-king, the Son of Heaven, and his kingdom was the center of the world. (Note: All foundation myths in Korean mythology feature divine or semidivine origin. Since antiquity, kingship was sacred.) As the descendants of the Son of Heaven, the kings of Goguryeo were the Scions of Heaven (Korean: 천손; Hanja: 天孫), who had supreme authority and sacerdotally intermediated between Heaven and Earth. The Goguryeo concept of tianxia was significantly influenced by the original Chinese concept, but its foundation laid in Dongmyeong. In contrast to the Chinese tianxia, which was based on the Mandate of Heaven, the Goguryeo tianxia was based on divine ancestry. As Goguryeo became centralized, Dongmyeong became the state god of Goguryeo. His worship was widespread among the people, and the view that Goguryeo was the center of the world was not limited to the royal family and aristocracy. Dongmyeong was worshiped well into the Goryeo period of Korea; Yi Kyubo said "Even unlettered country folk can tell the tale of King [Dongmyeong]."

Goguryeo was an authority unto itself. It had an independent sphere of influence in Northeast Asia for more than 200 years around the 5th and 6th centuries. Goguryeo viewed itself as the Land of the Scion of Heaven and viewed its neighboring states of Baekje, Silla, and Eastern Buyeo as tributary states. (Note: Buyeo and Silla were legitimate tributary states; Baekje was not.) Together, they constituted a Goguryeo tianxia. A strong sense of commonality emerged, later culminating in a "Samhan" consciousness among the peoples of the Three Kingdoms. The Three Kingdoms of Korea were collectively called the Samhan in the Sui and Tang dynasties. Earlier, Goguryeo was called Samhan in the Book of Wei. The unification of the Samhan was later proclaimed by Silla in the 7th century and Goryeo in the 10th century.

Goguryeo monarchs were called kings, not emperors. Goguryeo kings were sometimes elevated to "great kings", "holy kings", or "greatest kings". (Note: "Great King of Goryeo" and "Greatest King of Goryeo" were also used.) They were equivalent to emperors and khagans. The Goguryeo title of "greatest king", or taewang (Korean: 태왕; Hanja: 太王), was similar to the Chinese title of "heavenly king". "King" was first used in Goguryeo around the beginning of the Common Era; it was first used in Northeast Asia in the 4th century BCE in Old Joseon, before "emperor", or huangdi, was first used in China. The indigenous titles of ga, gan, and han, which were similar to khan, were downgraded and the sinified title of king, or wang, became the supreme title in Northeast Asia. Goguryeo monarchs being called kings was not in deference to China; wang was not inferior to huangdi or khan in Goguryeo tradition.

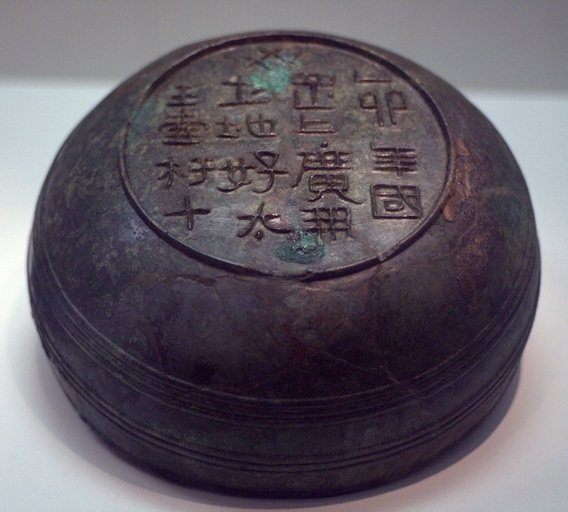
This bronze bowl was excavated from a Silla tomb in Gyeongju, the ancient capital of Silla. It is inscribed with the posthumous name of Gwanggaeto the Great.

Goguryeo had a pluralistic concept of tianxia. The Goguryeo tianxia was one among others that constituted the world. During the 5th and 6th centuries, a balance of power was maintained in East Asia between the Northern and Southern dynasties, the Rouran Khaganate, Goguryeo, and, later, Tuyuhun. Goguryeo maintained tributary relations with the Northern and Southern dynasties; the relationships were voluntary and profitable. A policy of coexistence was pursued and relations were peaceful. Goguryeo's tributary relations with the Northern and Southern dynasties were nominal. The Northern and Southern dynasties had no control over Goguryeo's foreign policy; Goguryeo pursued policies that went against Chinese interests. Goguryeo restrained Northern Wei, the strongest power in East Asia at the time, by allying with its enemies. Northern Wei said that Goguryeo was "worthy" and gave preferential treatment to its envoys. Southern Qi said that Goguryeo was "so strong that it [would not] follow orders". Goguryeo maintained cordial relations with the Rouran, and together attacked the Didouyu.

The Goguryeo tianxia was distinct from those of China and Inner Asia. During the 5th and 6th centuries, China and Goguryeo recognized each other's spheres of influence. China did not directly intervene in Goguryeo's tianxia of Northeast Asia, and vice versa. Goguryeo did not have westward ambitions, and instead moved its capital to Pyongyang in the 5th century. Within its sphere of influence, Goguryeo partially subjugated the Khitan, Mohe, and Didouyu, and influenced Buyeo, Silla, and Baekje. Peace was maintained with China for more than 150 years; it ended with the unification of China by the Sui dynasty. The unification of China changed the international balance of power. With its supremacy in Northeast Asia threatened, Goguryeo warred with a unified China for 70 years until its defeat in 668 by the Tang dynasty and Silla.

Silla's systems were based on those of Goguryeo. "Great king" was first used in Silla in the early 6th century as Silla expanded. (Note: "Greatest king" was also used.) Previously, maripgan, or "highest khan", was used; during its maripgan period (356–514), Silla was unified but not centralized. While the Goguryeo royalty and aristocracy were associated with the Son of Heaven, the Silla royalty and aristocracy were associated with the Buddha. Silla monarchs were viewed as the Buddha and Silla was viewed as a Buddha land from the early 6th century to the mid-7th century. Silla used its own era names during this period. Silla began building an imperial Buddhist temple called the Temple of the Imperial Dragon in the mid-6th century. "Great king" was last used in Silla by Muyeol of Silla; afterward, Silla accommodated itself to the tianxia of the Tang dynasty.

== Goryeo ==
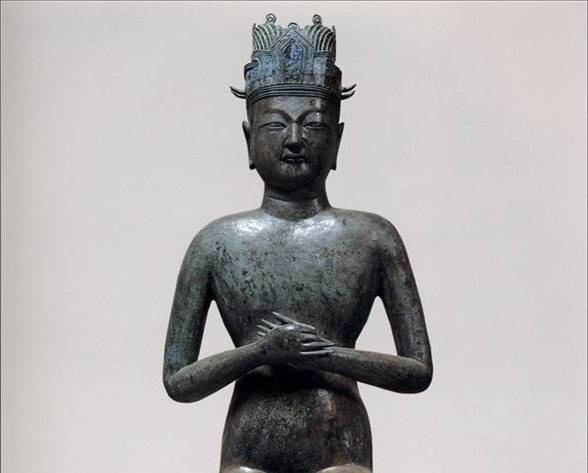
Bronze statue of Taejo of Goryeo, c. 951. This life-size nude statue of Taejo was clothed and worshiped until the end of the Goryeo dynasty; the practice of clothing and worshiping nude statues originated in Goguryeo. The statue is wearing an imperial crown called a tongcheongwan (통천관; 通天冠).

Taejo of Goryeo founded Goryeo in 918 as a successor to Goguryeo. He adopted the era name of "Bestowed by Heaven". Taejo was acknowledged as the successor to Dongmyeong in China. Goryeo was acknowledged as the successor to Goguryeo in China and Japan. Taejo unified Korea and proclaimed the unification of the "Samhan", or the Three Kingdoms of Korea. Goryeo viewed its Three Kingdoms heritage as nearly on a par with the imperial heritage of China. The conceptual world of the Samhan or the "Three Han"—Goguryeo, Silla, and Baekje—constituted a Goryeo tianxia. Within the Goryeo tianxia, called Haedong or "East of the Sea", Goryeo monarchs were emperors and Sons of Heaven.

Goryeo monarchs were called emperors and Sons of Heaven. (Note: "Holy emperor" (Korean: 성황; Hanja: 聖皇) and "holy monarch" (Korean: 신성제왕; Hanja: 神聖帝王) were also used.) Imperial titles were used since the beginning of the dynasty; Taejo was called "Son of Heaven" by the last king of Silla. Goryeo monarchs addressed imperial edicts and were addressed as "Your Imperial Majesty" (Korean: 폐하; Hanja: 陛下). They were posthumously bestowed with imperial temple names. The use of imperial language was widespread and ubiquitous in Goryeo. Imperial titles and practices extended to members of the royal family. Members of the royal family were commonly invested as kings. Goryeo monarchs wore imperial yellow clothing. Goryeo's imperial system was modeled after that of the Tang dynasty. The government consisted of three departments and six ministries and the military consisted of five armies. Kaesong was an imperial capital and the main palace was an imperial palace; Pyongyang and Seoul were secondary capitals. (Note: Gyeongju was previously a secondary capital. The secondary capitals represented the ancient capitals of the Three Kingdoms of Korea.) Goryeo maintained a tributary system. The Jurchens who later founded the Jin dynasty viewed Goryeo as a parent country and Goryeo monarchs as suzerains. Goryeo monarchs were initially called "Emperor of Goryeo" by the Jin dynasty. The Song dynasty, the Liao dynasty, and the Jin dynasty were well aware of and tolerated Goryeo's imperial claims and practices.

Goryeo had a pluralistic concept of tianxia. The Goryeo tianxia was one among others that constituted the world. During the 11th and part of the 12th centuries, a balance of power was maintained in East Asia between Goryeo, the Liao dynasty, the Song dynasty, and Western Xia. Goryeo played an active role in East Asian politics. Goryeo monarchs were called kings vis-à-vis China; Goryeo successively maintained tributary relations with the Five Dynasties (beginning with the Later Tang dynasty), the Song dynasty, the Liao dynasty, and the Jin dynasty. However, Goryeo's tributary relations with them were nominal. Goryeo had no political, economic, or military obligations to China. According to Peter Yun: "While Goryeo may have admired and adopted many of China's culture and institutions, there is little evidence that it accepted the notion of Chinese political superiority as the natural order of things." Goryeo monarchs possessed full de jure sovereignty. During the 11th and 12th centuries, Goryeo was assertive toward China. Goryeo treated imperial envoys from the Song, Liao, and Jin dynasties as equals, not superiors; imperial envoys were consistently downgraded.

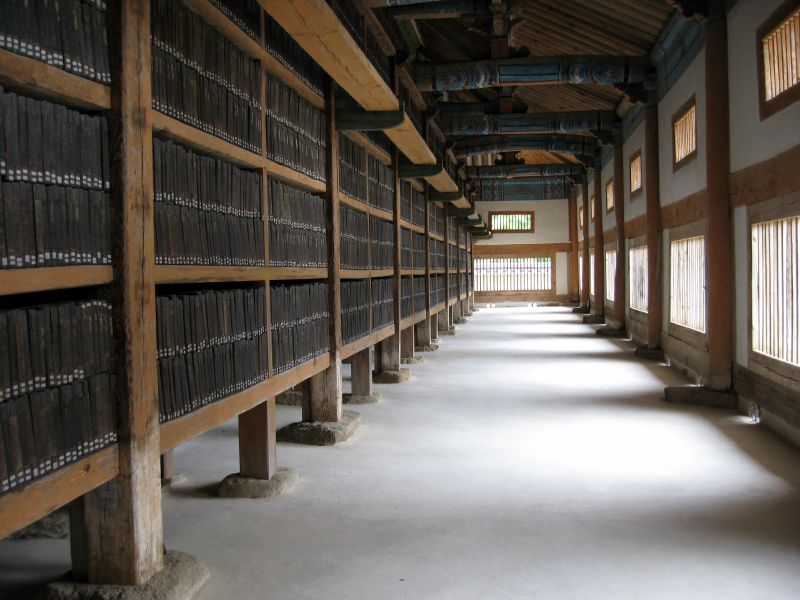
Goryeo monarchs commissioned a Korean version of the Tripitaka in the 11th century and again in the 13th century after the original was destroyed; only Sons of Heaven had the right to commission a Tripitaka.

Goryeo used both a royal and an imperial system during its early and middle periods. (Note: The royal system was used exclusively from the Seongjong period to the beginning of the Hyeonjong period and later during the second half of the Injong period. The imperial system was used exclusively during the first half of the Gwangjong period.) Goryeo monarchs were not strictly emperors at home and kings abroad: Goryeo's royal system was also used at home, and its imperial system was also used abroad. They were used almost indiscriminately. (Note: For example, Goryeo used Korean imperial titles and Chinese era names in tandem. Goryeo very rarely used Korean era names.) Goryeo's identity was not defined by its monarchs being kings or emperors but, instead, by them being Sons of Heaven. According to Remco E. Breuker: "The [Goryeo] ruler has been king, he has been emperor, and at times he was both. His correct appellation is not important, however, compared to the fact that he was considered to rule his own domain [tianxia]; his own, not just politically and practically, but also ideologically and ontologically." Goryeo was an independent tianxia; within it, Goryeo monarchs were Sons of Heaven, called "Son of Heaven of East of the Sea" (Korean: 해동천자; Hanja: 海東天子), who were viewed as superhuman beings who alone mediated between Heaven and the Korean people. Goryeo monarchs were called chakravartins and viewed as reincarnated bodhisattvas in the Buddhist community.

The Goryeo worldview partly originated during earlier periods of Korean history. It was possibly a continuation of the Goguryeo worldview. New elements were introduced during the Goryeo period. The Goryeo worldview was more influenced than was the Goguryeo worldview by Confucianism. Confucianism was the main political ideology during the Goryeo period, but not during the Three Kingdoms period. According to Edward Y. J. Chung: "[Confucianism] played a subordinate role to the traditional ideas and institutions maintained by noble families and hereditary aristocrats, as well as by the Buddhist tradition." The Goryeo worldview was possibly influenced by Dongmyeong worship and Balhae refugees: Dongmyeong was highly venerated and widely worshiped in Goryeo. He was the only one among the progenitors of the Three Kingdoms of Korea who was honored with shrines; his tomb and shrine in Pyongyang were called the Real Pearl Tomb and the Shrine of Holy Emperor Dongmyeong. Balhae used imperial titles and era names. Taejo viewed Balhae as a kin country and accepted many refugees from it; Balhae refugees constituted 10 percent of the Goryeo population.

Goryeo entered a period of military dictatorship similar to a shogunate in the late 12th century. During this period of de facto military rule, Goryeo monarchs continued to be viewed as Sons of Heaven and emperors, and Goryeo continued to be viewed as a tianxia. The view of Goryeo as a tianxia inspired a spirit of resistance to the Mongols in the 13th century. Goryeo capitulated to the Mongols after 30 years of war and later became a semiautonomous "son-in-law state" (Korean: 부마국; Hanja: 駙馬國) to the Yuan dynasty in 1270. Goryeo's imperial system ended with Wonjong of Goryeo. During this period of Mongol dominance, Goryeo monarchs were demoted to kings and temple names indicated loyalty to the Yuan dynasty. The Songs of Emperors and Kings and Memorabilia of the Three Kingdoms maintained the view of Goryeo as a tianxia. However, the view of Goryeo as a tianxia gradually declined. Goryeo ended its son-in-law status in 1356: Gongmin of Goryeo recovered Ssangseong and declared autonomy. Meanwhile, Neo-Confucianism emerged as the dominant ideology; Confucianism profoundly influenced Korean thought, religion, socio-political systems, and ways of life for the first time in Korean history. The powerful influence of Neo-Confucianism in the twilight of the Goryeo dynasty led to a growing Sinocentric view of Korea as a "little China".

== Joseon ==
The Goryeo dynasty transitioned into the Joseon dynasty in 1392. The architects of the Joseon dynasty were anti-Buddhist Neo-Confucian scholar-officials. They transformed Korea from a Buddhist country into a Confucian country. Joseon was a thoroughly Confucian country; it was the self-proclaimed most and later only Confucian country in the world. The view of Korea as a unification of the "Three Han"—Goguryeo, Silla, and Baekje—continued in the Joseon dynasty. Sejong the Great built shrines for the progenitors of the Three Kingdoms of Korea; he said that the Three Kingdoms were equal and rejected a proposal to worship only the progenitor of Silla. The view of Korea as a tianxia or a center of the world ended in the Joseon dynasty. Joseon monarchs were kings, not emperors; Joseon viewed China as the only center of the world.

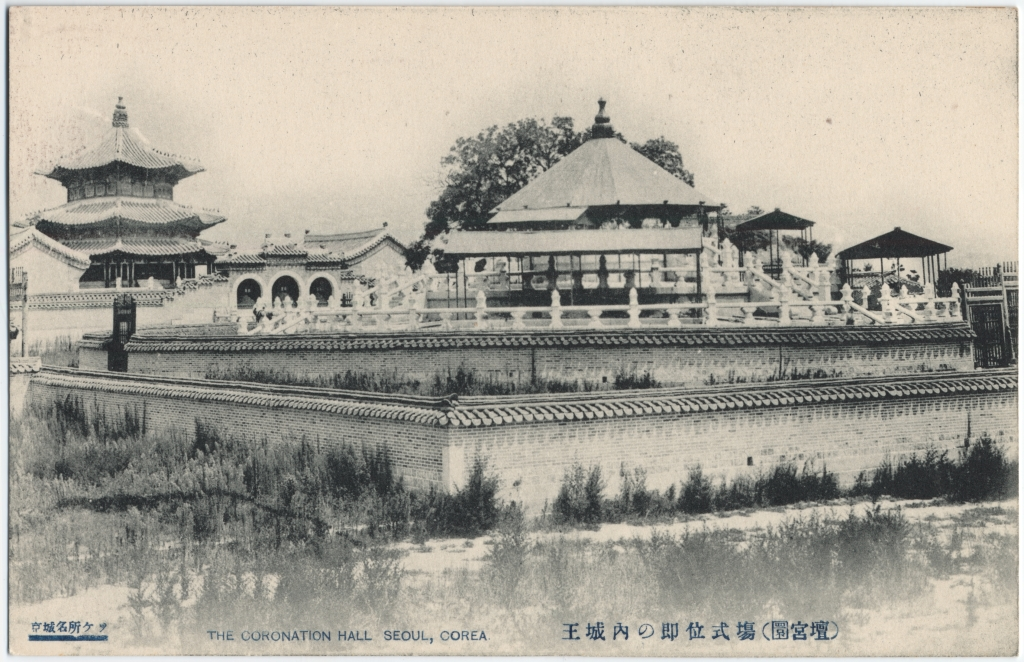
Korean monarchs sacrificed to Heaven during the Three Kingdoms, Goryeo, and early Joseon periods. During the early Joseon period, it was hotly debated whether Joseon kings, who were not Sons of Heaven, had the right to sacrifice to Heaven. The practice was suppressed and finally abolished in 1464; it was later revived during the Korean Empire period.

The Neo-Confucian Joseon dynasty was greatly influenced by a Confucian concept called sadae, or "serving the great". Joseon maintained a policy of tributary sadae toward China, and China maintained a policy of benign neglect toward Joseon. As a successor state, the Joseon dynasty was obligated to compile an official history of its predecessor state. The preceding Goryeo dynasty, however, had been a qualitatively different society and had held a qualitatively different position vis-à-vis China. Goryeo had maintained an imperial system that ran counter to sadae; it had maintained only a nominal sadae toward China. (Note: Goryeo maintained a "son-in-law" relationship toward the Yuan dynasty that is viewed in Korean historiography as a period of "interference" rather than simply sadae.) Joseon Neo-Confucian ideologues loyal to sadae compiled a distorted history of Goryeo that suppressed the fact that it had maintained an imperial system. Sejong adamantly opposed them and advocated historical accuracy. Despite its Neo-Confucian orthodoxy, the Joseon dynasty inherited some imperial traditions from the Goryeo dynasty. (Note: For example, Joseon kings were posthumously bestowed with imperial temple names.) According to Remco E. Breuker, this can be attributed to "the total weight of the cultural and historical power accumulated during centuries of use".

There is a nominal dependence upon China, very similar to that recognized by [Thailand] and [Vietnam]. Tribute is regularly sent. Acts of submission are from time to time recorded: but the Chinese Government exercise no real authority, and seems never to interfere with the jurisdiction of Corean [sic] functionaries. The authority of the King is absolute.

— Sir John Bowring, Governor of Hong Kong (1854)

The Joseon dynasty was autonomous in its internal and external affairs. It was not a colony or dependency of China. However, China abandoned its conventional laissez-faire policy of noninterference toward Korea and adopted a radical interventionist policy of interference in the late 19th century. According to Ming-te Lin: "This was indeed the most aggressive and visible behavior of China's intervention in Korean politics since the Yuan dynasty (Ming China assisted Korea once, but did not interfere with her politics), and it was the turning point in [Qing] China's policy toward Korea." The late 19th century was a turbulent period in Korean history: Korea experienced interventions by not only China but also Japan and the West. Japan brought Korea into its sphere of influence with a victory over China in 1895. Korea turned to Russia to counterbalance Japan. A new Korean reformist group called the Independence Club emerged and called for the establishment of a new imperial government that could claim equality with the empires of China, Japan, and Russia and safeguard the independence of Korea. King Gojong declared Korea an empire and himself an emperor in 1897. (Note: The era name was changed to Gwangmu on 16 August 1897. Afterward, Gojong was named Emperor of Korea (ko:대한제국 황제) on 12 October 1897.) However, the new Korean Empire was an empire in name only. The Korean Empire was reduced to a protectorate in 1905 after Japan defeated Russia and a colony in 1910 after Japan annexed Korea.

The Korean Empire, or the "Great Han Empire", was named after the Three Han. Gojong said that the Goryeo dynasty unified the Samhan and the Joseon dynasty expanded the land to 4,000 li. The Republic of Korea (South Korea), or the "Great Han Republic", is named after the Korean Empire.

== See also ==
- Korean nobility
- List of monarchs of Korea
- T'aesangwang
