= Archaeology of North Korea =

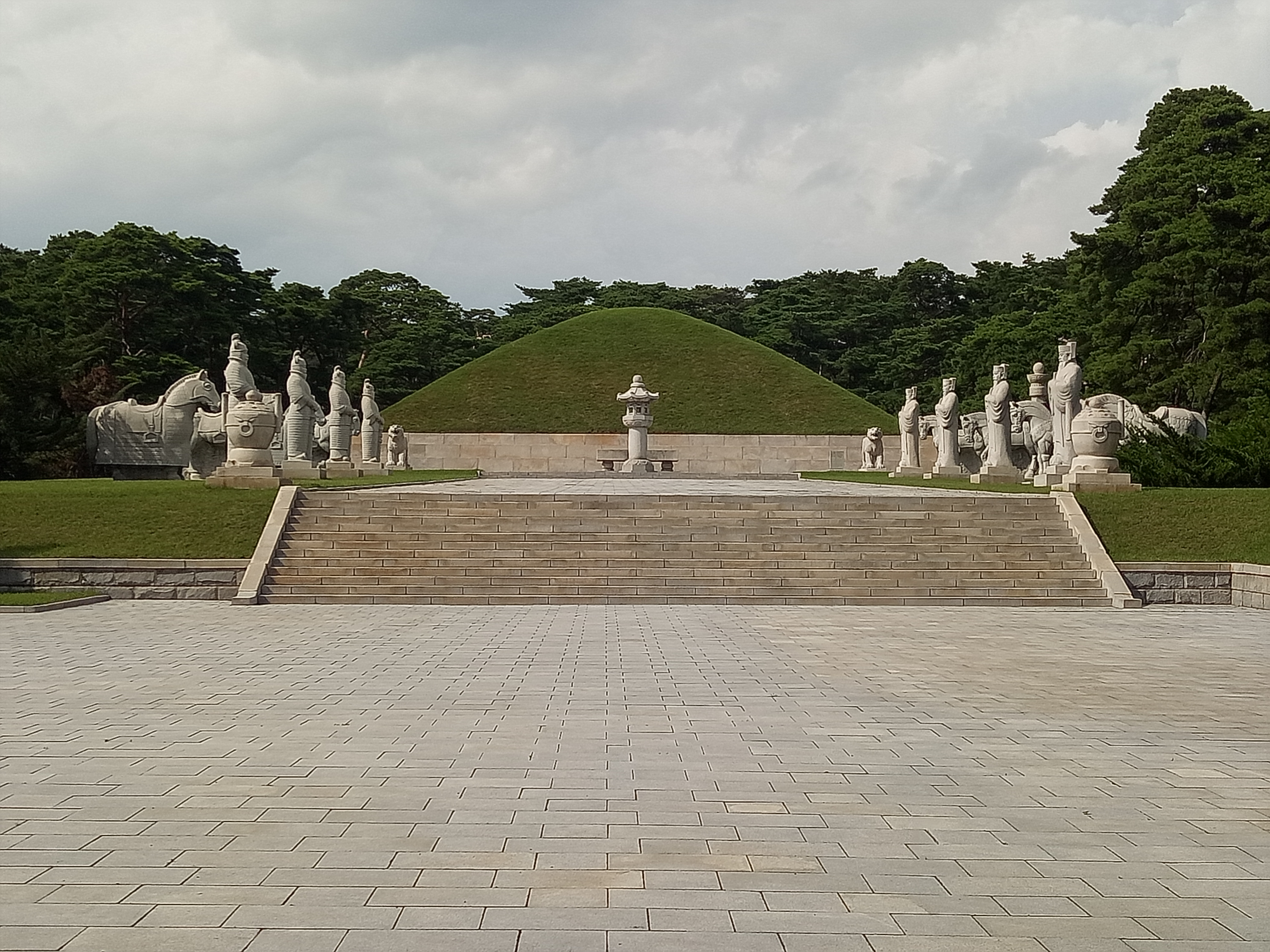
The Tomb of King Tongmyong in Pyongyang, part of the Goguryeo tombs World Heritage Site

The archaeological record of what is now North Korea stretches back to the first human presence in the peninsula during the Middle Pleistocene. Multiple stone tool traditions existed in Korea during the Late Paleolithic, possibly due to the migration of different groups into the peninsula from the northwest. The Jeulmun period, featuring the introduction of pottery and sedentism, began around 6000 BCE. The Mumun culture, likely spreading into the peninsula from northeast China around the second millennium BCE, is attested by megalithic dolmens and large villages of pit-houses. It saw the introduction of bronzeworking and fully agricultural lifestyle to Korea. In 109 BCE, the Chinese Han dynasty invaded and conquered the state of Wiman Joseon, which had emerged in the area around modern Pyongyang. The Han established four commanderies to govern the area; one of these, Lelang, governed portions of northwestern Korea until it was conquered by the rising Goguryeo kingdom in 313 CE. Goguryeo, characterized by its large royal tombs, dominated northern Korea until it was conquered by Silla in 668.

Korea did not develop a systemic tradition of archaeology prior to the practice's introduction into East Asia during the late 19th century. Early antiquarian texts were relatively uninterested in prehistory and artifacts. As Korea fell under the influence of the Empire of Japan in the late 19th century, Japanese archaeologists began to survey the region, seeking to find evidence of the ancestral Yamato people, while Japanese treasure hunters looted Korean archaeological sites. Japanese teams did not generally train Korean students. Following World War II and the division of the peninsula, the European-educated scholars To Yu-ho and Han Hŭng-su became the founding archaeologists of North Korea. After a series of purges and the cessation of most academic work in the country by the late 1960s, a new archaeological academia emerged in the 1970s under the influence of the state ideology of Juche.

Modern North Korean archaeology is oriented around Juche thought, incorporating elements of nationalism and Marxist historiography. It sees Korean civilization as having developed independently, rejecting interpretations which emphasize Chinese influence. Preferring to use traditional historical accounts in lieu of radiocarbon dating, North Korean scholars have adopted a less conservative chronology than their South Korean counterparts, often dating events much earlier. The Institute of Archaeology of the Academy of Social Sciences and the Faculty of History at Kim Il Sung University are the primary archaeological organizations in North Korea, offering archaeological degrees, publishing academic journals, and conducting excavations.

== Archaeological record ==
=== Paleolithic ===
The earliest human presence in the Korean Peninsula date to the Early Paleolithic. The precise dating of the earliest archaic humans is uncertain, with several sites of disputed age or human presence. Objects resembling stone tools have been found at Hukwuri Cave (흑우리 동굴), part of the Komun Moru site in Sangwon County, southeast of the North Korean capital of Pyongyang. Hand-axes similar to the Acheulean type have been found there, and at Jeongok-ri, just south of the Demilitarized Zone dividing North and South Korea. Found among the remains of Middle Pleistocene animals and deposited at least 400,000 years ago, it is uncertain whether the objects were actually shaped by humans. While disputed Homo erectus remains have been found in South Korea, they are well attested in northeastern China; as such, human presence in Korea likely dates to the Middle Pleistocene. H. erectus likely dispersed throughout the peninsula after entering from Northern China via the coastal plains. Claimed Neanderthal sites dating to the Riss-Würm interglacial (c. 120,000 years ago) have been found in both North and South Korea, but without conclusive evidence. Later specimens from the Last Glacial Period have been designated as Homo sapiens.

During the Late Paleolithic, blades developed in the Korean peninsula. Stone blades likely spread to Korea somewhere between 40,000 and 30,000 years ago, possibly originating in the Altai Mountains of Central Asia. At least four different stone tool industries coexisted in Korea during the Late Paleolithic. This may have been due to multiple waves of migration by different groups, including a group of blade-using peoples from Mongolia and northern China. The paleolithic inhabitants of Korea subsisted off hunting (likely of wild boar and deer), fishing, and foraging, although a lack of projectile points and storage containers within the archaeological record impedes the identification of the specific foods consumed. Climate conditions were relatively mild and stable in the peninsula during the Pleistocene, although rising sea levels during interglacial periods flooded the vast coastal plains and restricted the inhabitants to the mountainous and forested interior.

In Korean archaeological chronology, the period from about 15,000 to 8,000 BCE has been termed the Terminal Paleolithic. The population of the peninsula was still dispersed into small hunter gatherer groups; one 2009 study suggested a total population of no more than 40,000 during the last two millennia of the Paleolithic. Microblade technology entered the peninsula shortly before the Terminal Paleolithic from Mongolia, but other microblade traditions possibly originated in Japan. This period was marked by an almost complete lack of sites in the archaeological record until the late 20th century, and some previous models suggested that Korea was abandoned during this period. Although discoveries in the late 20th century narrowed this relatively unattested time period, there remains very few known sites until the introduction of pottery some millennia later.

=== Jeulmun period ===
The Neolithic in the Korean peninsula corresponds to the Jeulmun period, named for a local tradition of combed pottery. The Neolithic saw the introduction of pottery, sedentism, and likely plant cultivation. A few Korean sites have been labeled "Pre-Pottery Neolithic" due to settlement locations and stone tools more closely resembling those associated with the Neolithic. However, the namesake pottery was not the first form of ceramic in the region, and the "Jeulmun period" label is often applied to sites predating the emergence of the Jeulmun pottery itself. Hunting, fishing, and foraging remained important food sources while agriculture gradually gained prominence; it is unclear when the transition to a largely agrarian society took place.

Pottery emerged in the Korean peninsula around 6000 BCE. During the early stages of the Neolithic, the dominant pottery culture of northern Korea, the Ossani pottery, was characterized by similarities to the Boisman culture. Ossani type sites also include a wide variety of lithics, including fishhooks, axes, arrowheads, sickles, knives, pestles, and hammers. They were contemporary to the Yunggimun pottery type of the southeastern coast. The Jeulmun pottery culture emerged on the northwestern coastal lowlands, with the oldest clusters of sites around the Taedong River of North Korea and the Han River in South Korea.

Prominent Jeulmun sites in North Korea include the Chitamni on the Chaeryong River (noted for the presence of grains) and Chonghori just east of Pyongyang (noted for the presence of both Jeulmun and Yunggimun pottery). A cluster of sites have been found along the Yalu River, featuring a number of distinctions from the classical Jeulmun pottery, while another cluster around the Tumen River (on the border with China and Russia) shows a stronger affiliation with the Neolithic cultures elsewhere in southeastern Siberia.

A slight majority of Jeulmun sites are shell middens, found along the coast or on islands. Pit-houses first appear in the archaeological record around 5500 BCE, but are rare prior to 3500. Early pit-houses have been found in the central regions of Korea, generally found in clusters of less than ten houses in sites around the Taedong, Han, and Imjin Rivers. Around the Han and Imjin, settlements increased in size as the Neolithic progressed, generally comprising ten to twenty houses (although settlement sites larger and smaller than this are both attested). Many are located on hilltops and feature kilns. Ornamental artifacts are rarely found in Jeulmun sites, beyond scant pieces of jewelry and some clay figurines. The Jeulmun period ended around 1100.

=== Mumun period ===
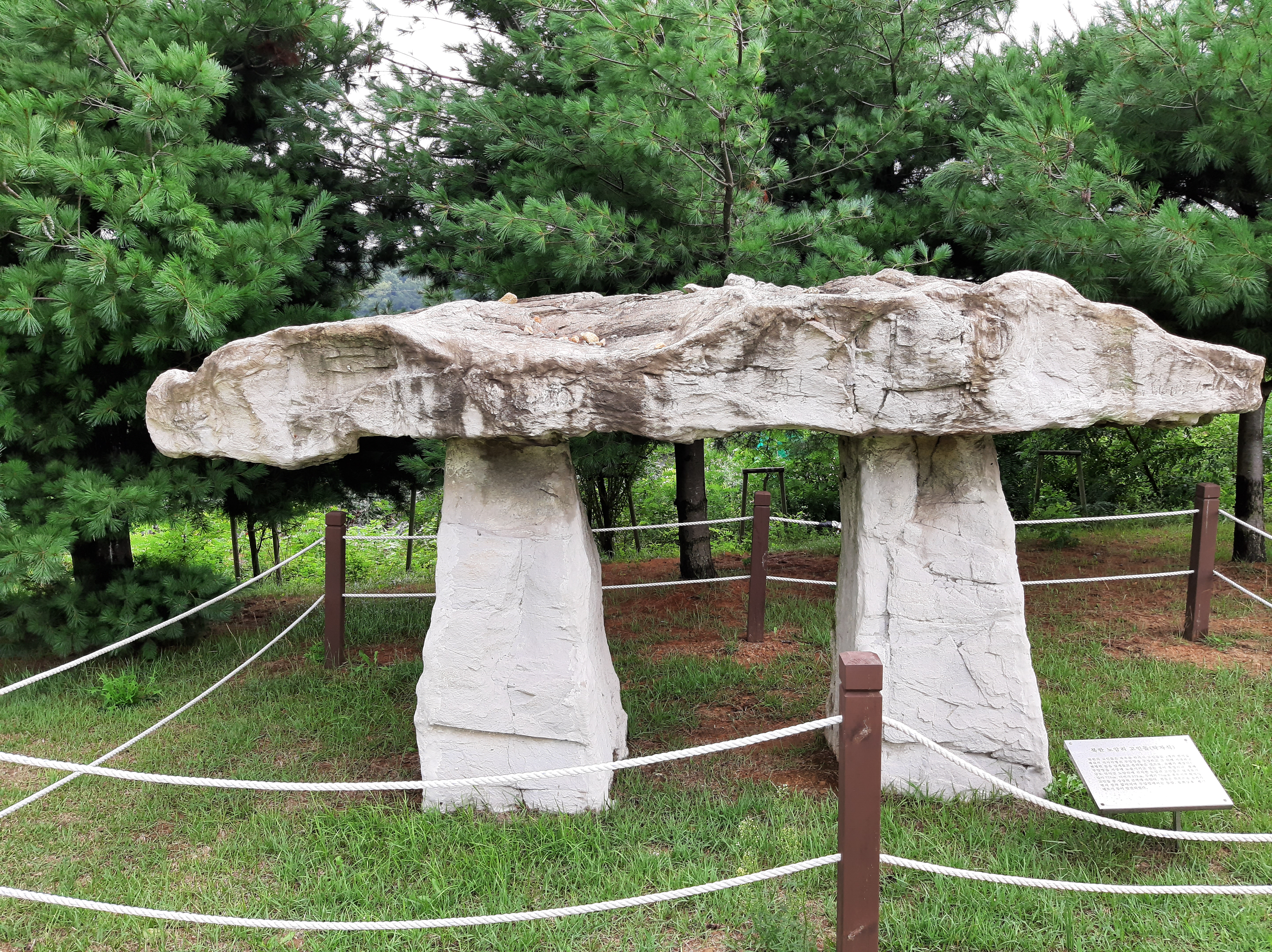
A northern-style dolmen at Ganghwa Island in South Korea, similar to those found in North Korea and the Liaodong Peninsula

The Mumun period is named for the characteristic Mumun (무문; 無文; 'without markings') pottery which appeared in Korea at some point between 2300 and 1300 BCE, overlapping significantly with the Jeulmun; this may have been due to a prolonged spread of the culture into the peninsula from Northeastern China. The period saw the introduction of bronze smelting, the construction of megalithic dolmens, and the predominance of agriculture for subsistence. The period's chronology is divided into early (before c. 850), middle (c. 850 – c. 550) and late (c. 550 – c. 300) stages.

Mumun village sites were larger than their Jeulmun counterparts, and gradually increased in size over the course of the period. Mumun villages consisted of larger pit-houses, of both circular and rectangular shape, which often contained multiple hearths. Excavated villages range from tens to hundreds of pit houses in size; among the larger village sites in North Korea are Simchalli and Soktalli, both in the Hwanghae region. Villages moved from the river valleys to the hilltops, and as such Jeulmun and Mumun artifacts are rarely found together. Settlements became less dense in the mountainous northern and eastern regions of Korea, but more favorable conditions for cultivation led to increased density in the west.

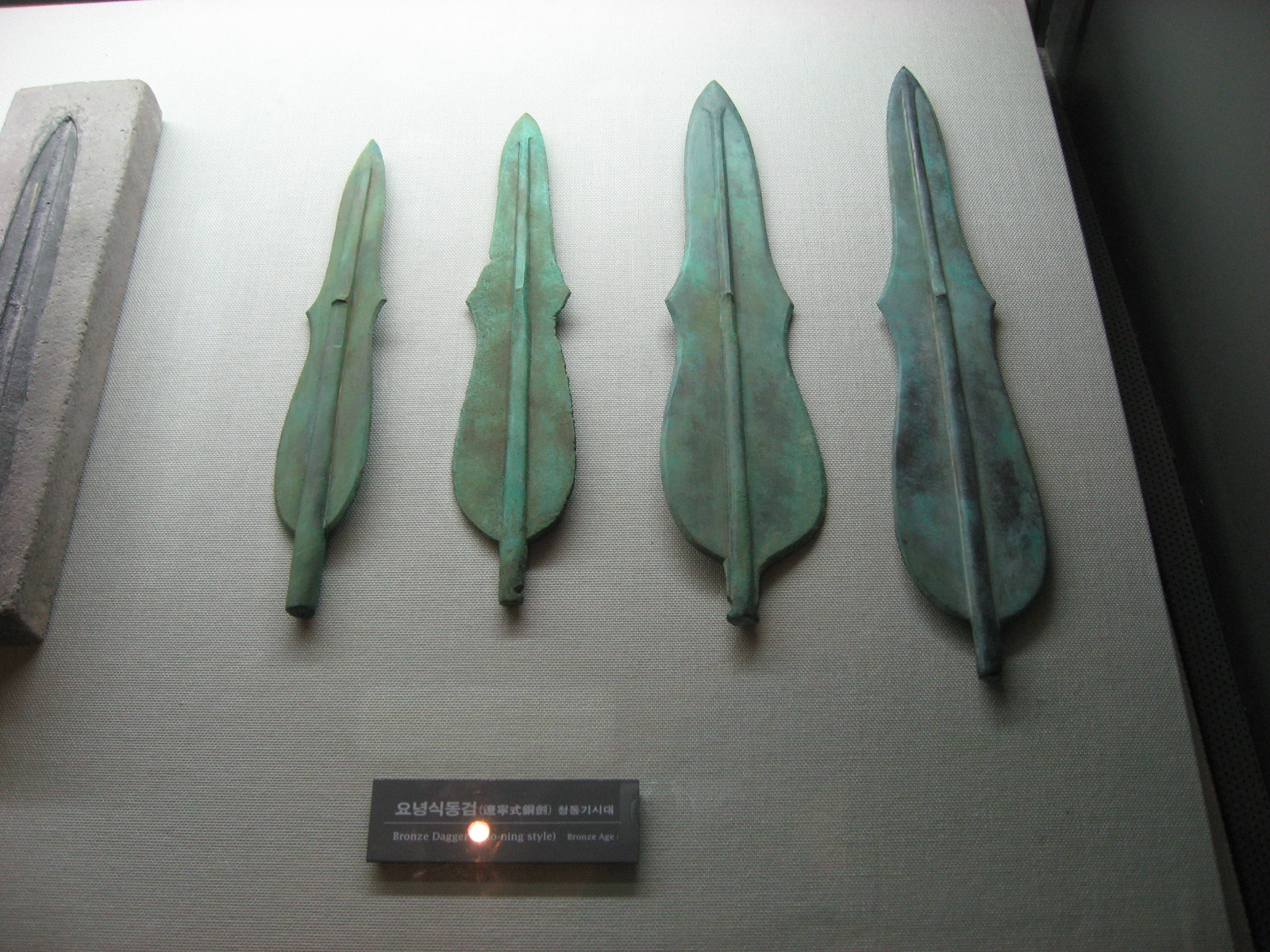
Liaoning bronze daggers feature wide protuberances from either side of the blade.

Dolmens in North Korea are similar to those found in the Liaodong Peninsula, featuring a large capstone placed atop a number of smaller slabs below. However, unlike their counterparts in Liaodong, they consist of rough, unpolished stones. Capstone dolmen are common in North Korea, but very few are found south of Seoul. Dolmen clusters are usually located near village sites, and are thought to serve as grave markers; however, their prominence has led most to be looted, and only a few dolmen sites have produced useful archaeological remains.

Mirrors are the most common bronze artifacts from the Mumun period, but weapons such as daggers, spearpoints, and arrowheads are also found. The Liaoning bronze daggers, featuring wide violin-shaped protuberances, are found across much of the Korean peninsula in addition to the Liaodong Peninsula and the Bohai Bay coast. Locally produced bronze artifacts contain a greater percentage of zinc than their Chinese counterparts, with a zinc content between seven and thirteen percent. Zinc, copper, and tin are all found in the peninsula, allowing for locally available raw materials for bronze production.

=== Iron Age ===
By 400 BCE, innovations such as iron tools and above-ground houses spread throughout the Korean Peninsula. Although different Korean archaeologists have historically given dramatically different dates for domestic iron production (ranging from the 6th to 1st centuries BCE), it likely spread from China during the Warring States period (475–221 BCE). Trade from the state of Yan is attested in northwestern Korea during this period, evidenced by the presence of Yan knife money at sites also containing iron tools. The Musan site along the Tumen River in North Hamgyong Province show evidence of early domestic iron manufacturing (possibly dating to 480 BCE), as do various other village sites in Hwanghae and two near Wonsan in northern Kangwon. Pit graves are found across Korea during this time period, with the greatest number in the northwest. Ceramics during the period differ sharply from Mumun pottery.

Chinese sources such as the Classic of Mountains and Seas and the Strategies of the Warring States briefly mention the existence of a Koren state called Joseon (now referred to as Gojoseon, 'Old Joseon') with an unclear location; it may have been outside the Korean peninsula. The late 3rd century CE Records of the Three Kingdoms describes a Chinese general named Wiman adopting Korean customs and founding the state of Wiman Joseon with a group of followers in the early 2nd century BCE, driving out the local ruler and establishing his capital near what is now Pyongyang. In 109 BCE, the Chinese Han dynasty launched an invasion of Joseon, conquering much of northern Korea as far east as the Sea of Japan and as far south as the Han River. The Han established four commanderies to govern the area, although most were shortly lived; by 75 BCE, only the Lelang Commandery near modern Pyongyang remained in Chinese control. Although the Lelang Commandery dominated portions of North Korea for around 400 years, it left relatively few archaeological remains. Tombs and burial mounds are the most common archaeological sites from the Lelang period. Some dates are obtainable from Lelang artifacts, such as a lacquer bowl dated to the year 69 CE.

=== Three Kingdoms ===
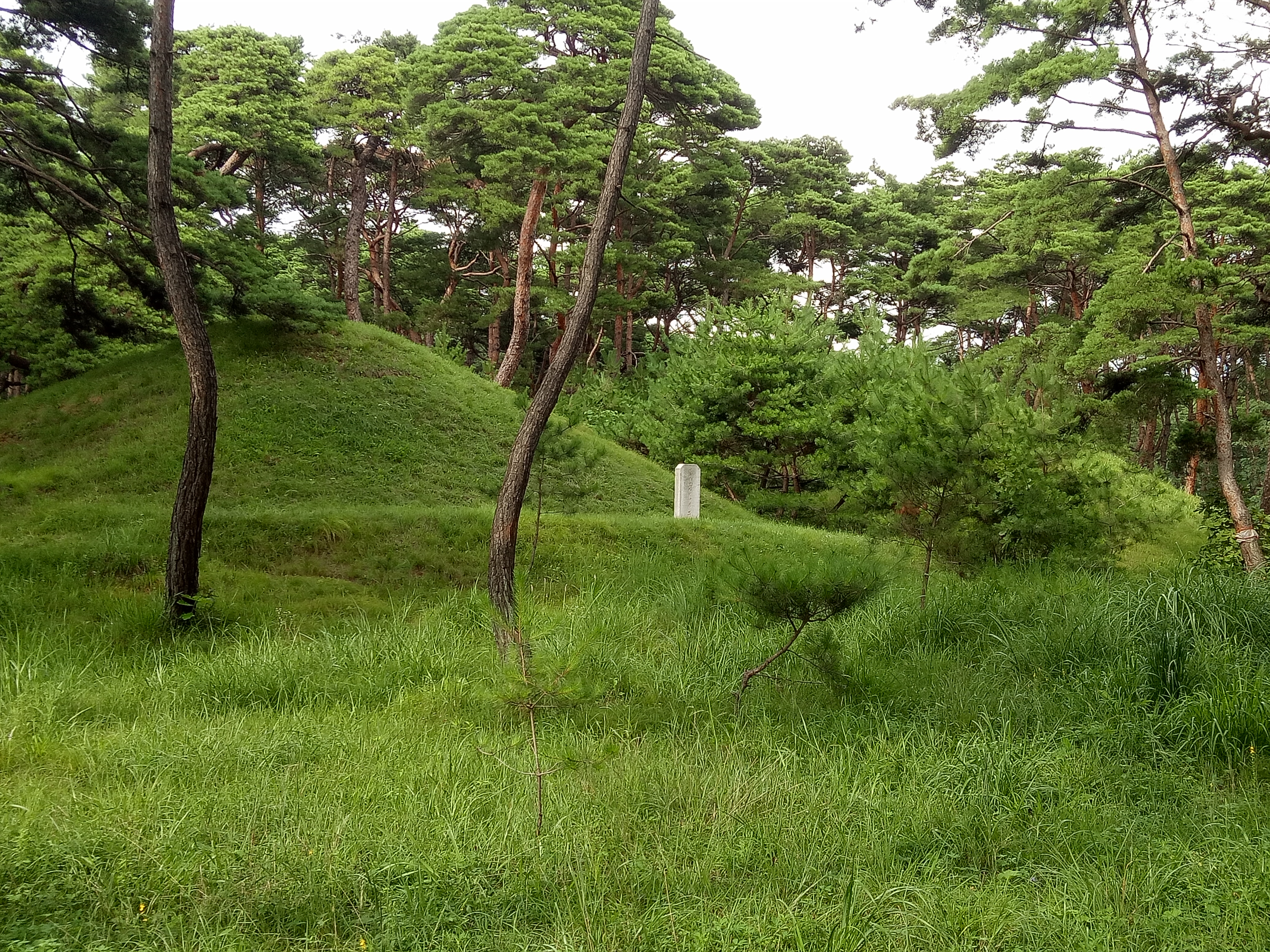
Goguryeo tombs in Pyongyang

From around 300 to 668, the Korean peninsula was mainly divided between three expansionist kingdoms: Goguryeo in the north, Paekche in the southwest, and Silla in the southeast. A fourth state, the Kaya confederacy, emerged along the Nakdong River on the southern coast. The most prominent archaeological features of the Three Kingdoms Period are the large elite tombs from each polity. Buddhism was introduced to the peninsula during the late 300s and was adopted by each of the three kingdoms.

Around the 1st century BCE, Goguryeo emerged in the Yalu River basin in what is now northeastern China. The Lelang Commandery held onto a stretch of territory in northern Korea, but was bordered to the north by the expanding Goguryeo and by the Samhan confederacies in the south. Frequent military conflicts between the Goguryeo and the Lelang Commandery are recorded from 12 CE onward. Chinese forces were unable to conquer the kingdom. The Records of the Three Kingdoms records that Goguryeo conquered and extracted tribute from the Okjeo tribes in Hamgyong before the late 3rd century. In 313, the Goguryeo conquered Lelang and began to push south against Paekche, establishing a frontier in the Han River basin. At its greatest extent, around the beginning of the 5th century, the kingdom had conquered northwest as far as the Liao River. They established a new capital at Pyongyang in 427, although continued occupying their initial heartland along the Yalu.

The Goguryeo developed a distinct material culture with influence both from China and from the nomadic groups of the northwest. Goguryeo royal tombs initially took the form of pyramidal structures made of cut stone, while later examples are hemispherical tumuli containing stone burial chambers. Although almost universally plundered in antiquity, many of them still contain elaborate murals. Horse equipment has been found at Goguryeo sites, including some of the earliest examples of stirrups.

The state of Silla enjoyed relative isolation in the southeast of the peninsula, protected by natural barriers from Paekche, Goguryeo, and China. By the 500s, the expanding Silla state had reached as far north as South Hamgyong in northern Korea, testified by two stone markers installed on the orders of King Jinheung. Allying with the Tang dynasty, the Silla conquered Paekche in 660 and Goguryeo in 668, unifying much of the peninsula and beginning the Unified Silla period, which would last until 935. Portions of what is now northeast China, the Russian Far East, and North Korea became part of the Parhae in 698, established in a revolt against Tang incursions by the Goguryeo people and the Mohe tribes. Parhae would last until 926, when it was conquered by an alliance between Silla and the Khitan Liao dynasty.

== Archaeological studies ==
Korea did not have a systemic tradition of archaeology prior to its introduction into East Asia during the late 19th century. Antiquarian texts contained relatively cursory mentions of ancient structures and inscriptions, while interest towards prehistory and artifacts was relatively limited. Stone tools found in the region were often called 'thunder-axes' (雷斧, noebu) or 'thunder-daggers' (雷劒, noegŏm) by scholars during the Joseon dynasty (1392–1897). The predominant early view considered them artifacts of the Chinese thunder god Leigong, possibly containing magical or medicinal value. The 15th century scholar Yi Yuk wrote that they must have been shaped by an artisan, but could not understand how or why they were made. Writing in the early 19th century, the scholar Kim Chŏnghŭi discovered stone arrowheads in the northeast of Korea; he identified them with the 'bush clover arrows' of the Sushen, a people of northeastern China mentioned in the Han dynasty chronicle Shiji.

=== Japanese period ===
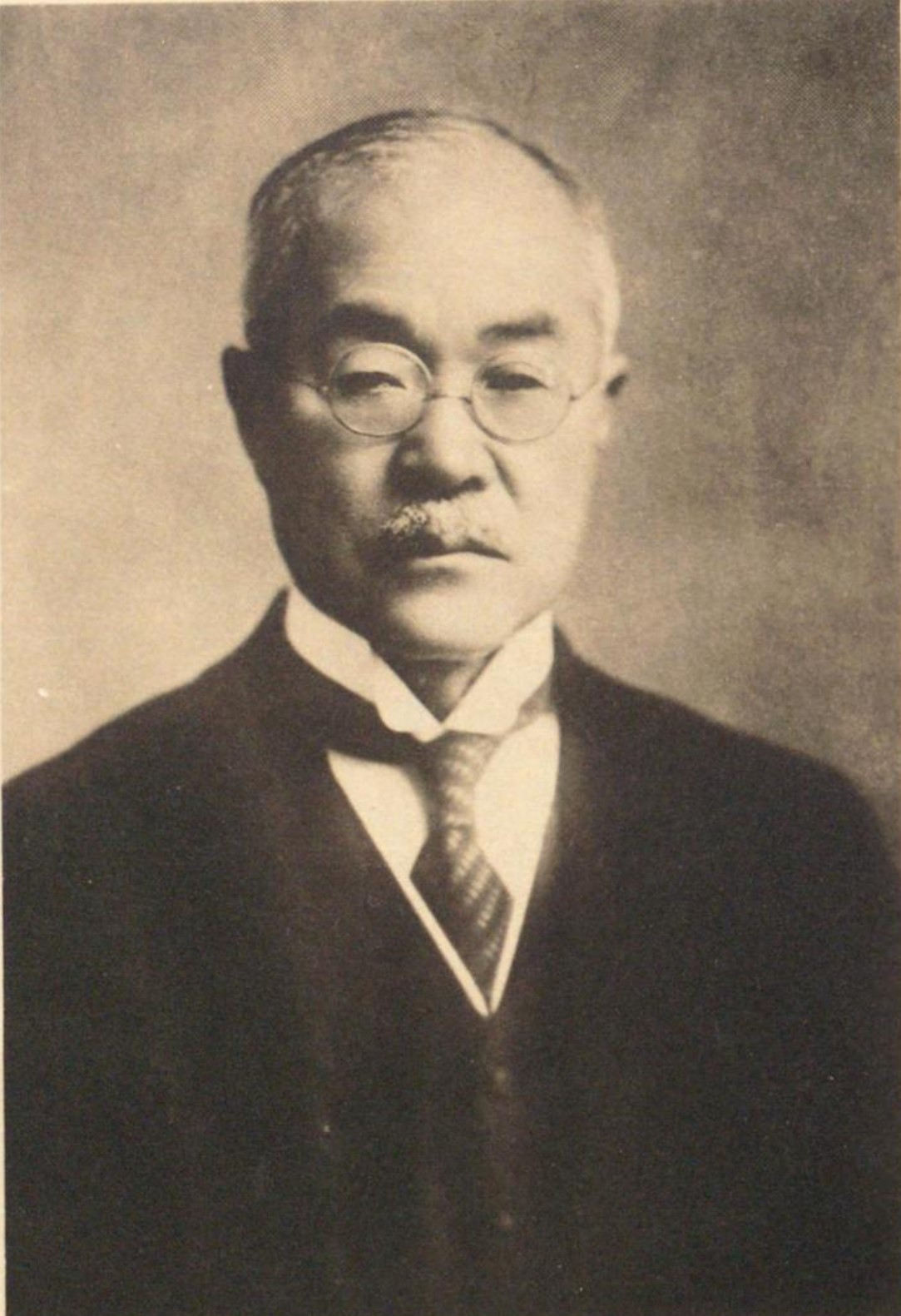
Sekino Tadashi, a Japanese scholar who conducted early archaeological surveys of Korea

Modern archaeology began in Korea during the Korean Empire (1897–1910), when the country began to fall under Japanese influence. Archaeologists were strongly limited in their ability to conduct excavations in Japan, and so the early Japanese archaeological community began to investigate sites in other regions of East Asia. Initial archaeological interest in Korea was spurred by a desire to find evidence of the ancestral Yamato people, which they believed had to come to Japan from the peninsula; Japanese nationalist theorists believed Koreans and Japanese to descend from a common ancestor. Most early investigations were surveys conducted by the Tokyo Imperial University. In 1900, the Tokyo Imperial University anthropologist Tsuboi Shōgorō dispatched his student Yagi Sōzaburō to Korea to conduct the first archaeological survey of the country. Yagi's survey lasted four months and covered prehistoric and historic sites across Korea, including in the area around Pyongyang.

Two years later, the Japanese scholar Sekino Tadashi conducted a survey of art and archaeological history around four former royal capitals, including Pyongyang (the capital of Gojoseon and Goguryeo) and Kaesong (the capital of Goryeo). Sekino's research was compiled into a report published in 1904, Investigator's Report of Korean Architecture, which featured a periodization scheme of Korean art history and photographs of various temples, tombs, and ruins, informing the broader academic world of the presence of such archaeological sites in the peninsula. During the 1900s, Japanese antique dealers and looters began to plunder archaeological sites in Korea; the Royal Tombs of the Goryeo Dynasty around Kaesong were especially hard-hit, as they were poorly protected and contained valuable grave goods such as the Goryeo celadon ware.

At the request of the Japanese Residency-General of Korea (and later Government-General of Chōsen, GGC), Sekino and Torii Ryūzō conducted large-scale systemic surveys of archaeological sites in Korea. Sekino's survey, made from 1909 to 1911, primarily focused on architecture and relics, while Torii's 1910–1911 survey was intended to supplement it with anthropological and ethnographic information. Taking place during the official annexation of Korea by Japan in 1910, these surveys were intended to support colonial rule; confirming the presence of the ancient Lelang Commandery around Pyongyang was seen as a way to legitimize Japanese rule. Sekino's survey produced an inventory of 579 historical sites, sorted into four ranks by priority of preservation. Over the course of the survey, Sekino and his team excavated various tombs, and brought most of the discovered materials to Japan. Japanese archaeologists did not generally train Korean students; only a few amateur archaeologists assisted Japanese teams.

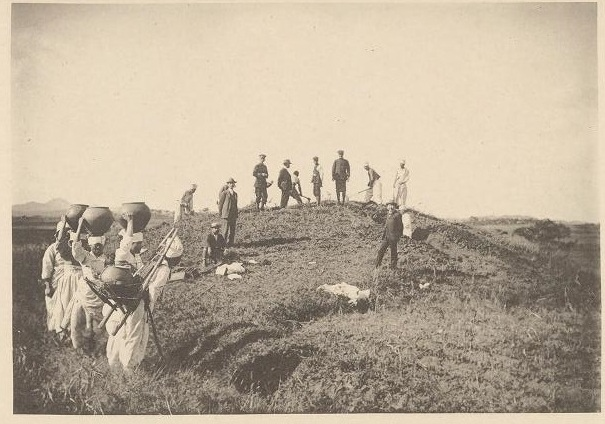
Japanese archaeologists standing atop Taedong Lelang Tomb 2, near Pyongyang, 1915

In 1916, the GGC promulgated a set of regulations governing archaeological remains in Korea, and established the Commission for the Investigation of Ancient Sites to explore archaeological sites on the peninsula. The commission set a five-year plan for surveying sites: in the first year (1916), they examined sites from Goguryeo and the Four Commanderies of Han; in the second, Samhan, Gaya, and Baekje; in the third, Silla and prehistoric sites; in the fourth, Silla, Yemaek, Okjeo, and Balhae; and in the fifth, two sites in the south. The commission was superseded by the Department of Investigation of Ancient Sites in 1921, founded to consolidate archaeological research in colonial Korea, while the following year the GGC established the Korean History Compilation Committee. A major focus of the compilation was to testify to the influence of the Han commanderies in the north, as well as to the existence of a purported ancient Japanese colony called Mimana in the south.

In the wake of the Great Depression and the Japanese invasion of Manchuria, state financial support for archaeological research declined during the 1930s. To make up for this, Japanese archaeologist Katsumi Kuroita created the Society for the Research of Korean Ancient Sites, financed by private and state donations from organizations such as the Ministry of the Imperial Household and the Prince Yi Family Household. The society established offices in Gyeongju, Buyeo, and Pyongyang. The society also established Kaesong Municipal Museum in 1931 and the Pyongyang Municipal Museum in 1933. That same year, the GGC established the Chōsen Sōtokufu Committee for the Preservation of Korean Treasures, Ancient Remains, Famous Places, and Natural Monuments in an attempt to curb the illicit antiquities trade. In 1933, the committee established a revamped set of heritage protections, stronger than the 1916 rules.

=== Postwar ===
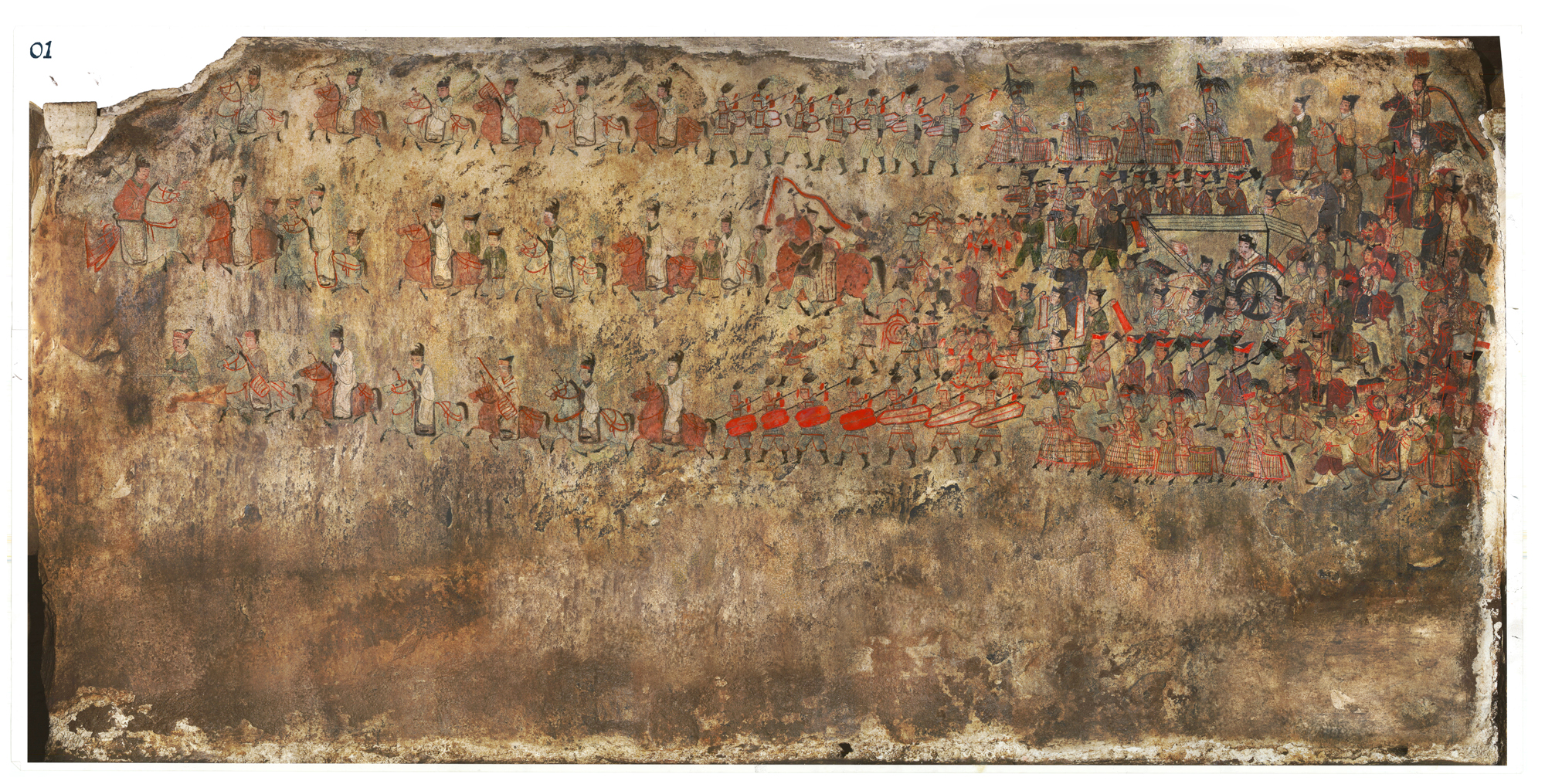
Mural in Anak Tomb No. 3, discovered in 1949 as one of the first major archaeological discoveries of the independent North Korea

In 1945, following the defeat of Japan in World War II, Korea was partitioned into Soviet and American occupation zones. This was initially intended as a temporary measure. The two zones became the Democratic People's Republic of Korea (North Korea) and Republic of Korea (South Korea), both claiming to be the legitimate government of the region. In 1946, the Provisional People's Committee of North Korea (an early iteration of the North Korean government) instituted a slate of cultural and heritage protections. To Yu-ho, an archaeologist educated abroad in Germany and Austria during the 1930s, emerged from hiding after 1945 and was hired as an archaeology professor at the National University of Pyongyang (now Kim Il Sung University) in 1946. He was joined there by another European-educated archaeologist, Han Hŭng-su, in 1948; together, To and Han emerged as the founding figures of archaeology in the newly independent state.

Academia in early North Korea was largely based on the Soviet Union, and its archaeology was largely based on Soviet archaeology, which heavily featured Marxist elements. Among the first major archaeological discoveries of the newly independent North Korea was the excavation of a shell midden in Unggi County in 1947 and the discovery of three Goguryeo tombs (including the richly-decorated Anak Tomb No. 3) in 1949 near Pyongyang. Initial articles were included in the ethnographic journal Munhwa yumul, which was published from 1949 to 1950, and afterwards in various historical journals.

The Korean War broke out in 1950 after North Korean forces invaded the south. After three years of fighting, an armistice was signed, dividing Korea along the Military Demarcation Line. While archaeological excavations were paused during the war, the war years saw the foundation of the Academy of Sciences in 1952, including the Institute of Material Culture (IMC) headed by To. Around the same time, Han was purged from academic influence for unclear reasons, possibly stemming from criticism by To. This left To as the dominant force in domestic archaeology.

Archaeological excavations resumed in 1954, following the armistice, with early archaeological work aimed at documenting and restoring cultural heritage damaged during the war. Led by To, North Korean archaeologists excavated a number of important archaeological sites during the 1950s, including the Bronze Age Odong site in Hoeryong (1954–1955) and the Neolithic Jitapri site in Pongsan (1957). During the 1950s and early 1960s, there were about twenty active archaeologists in North Korea, most with no prior academic experience. They conducted about 128 field investigations during the 1950s, significantly more than their South Korean counterparts. The first archaeology-specific journal, Munhwa yusan ('Cultural Heritage'), was published in 1957 by the Institute of Archaeology and Ethnography (formerly the IMC).

Although To was politically powerful and a loyal member of the ruling Workers' Party of Korea, his support of cultural diffusionism brought him in conflict with Marxist orthodoxy, which favored historical materialism and theories of autochthonic development. To's theories of cultural diffusion incorporated highly criticized hypotheses; he theorized that megaliths had emerged from the tradition of Ancient Egyptian mastabas, which spread to Korea via Indochina. By the late 1950s, North Korean archaeologists had generally adopted the culture-historical model in favor of historical materialism; To wrote that the turn towards the model was necessary in order to promote the national cultural heritage. In 1963, archaeologists discovered Paleolithic lithic artifacts at the Gulpori site, the first known Paleolithic site in Korea. This was hailed as a major breakthrough in the nation's archaeology.

=== Juche period ===
Around 1965, academic conditions in North Korea rapidly changed. To's culture-historical model fell out of support, as it was seen as contrary to the increasingly promoted ideas of socialist patriotism. The supreme leader Kim Il Sung increasingly criticized academics, seeing them as too influenced by bourgeois thought; To was purged in 1965 and removed from influence, while almost all academic work was halted by 1967, including archaeology. Academia would slowly reemerge during the 1970s in a condition strongly influenced by Juche, the emerging state ideology.

Our country boasts a long history, a history that began with the very first phase of mankind. Our Palaeolithic sites and artifacts clearly address that our ancestors have permanently resided in this land. Their gifted creativity enabled themselves to conquer the nature, to succeed in social evolution and to enjoy cultural prosperity.

— Palaeolithic Sites of Northern Korea, Institute of Archaeology of the Academy of Social Sciences, 2009

From the 1980s to the 2010s, Seo Guktae (a Neolithic and Bronze Age specialist) and Jang Woojin (a human evolution researcher) have been two of the most prolific and influential archaeologists in North Korea. Other prominent modern archaeologists include Kim Incheol (writing on Goguryeo, Goryeo, and Balhae) and Choi Seungtaek, the most prolific Goguryeo archaeologist.

== Ideology and perspectives ==
Modern North Korean archaeology has oriented itself towards the state ideology of Juche. Excavations are prioritized as a means to study the ancient past of the Korean people. Archaeological papers frequently contain nationalist elements and praise for the nation and the Korean people. According to Juche thought, the Korean people form a single ethnicity and bloodline, and Korean civilization developed without outside influence. North Korean archaeological thought sees the spread of bronze metallurgy as a purely indigenous development, and the Commandaries of Han are identified as a local kingdom. North Korean scholars view Korean cultural influence as traditionally extending to a large portion of Northeastern China, which they believe was conquered by Gojoseon and Goguryeo. In keeping with traditional Marxist historiography, Gojoseon is seen as a slave society, while the Three Kingdoms are analogous to feudal society.

North Korean archaeologists have been less reliant on radiocarbon dating than their southern counterparts, eschewing it due to expense or in favor of gathering dates from historical records and traditional accounts. As a result, South Korean archaeological chronology is more conservative than in the north, with later dates given for the Neolithic, Bronze Age, and the founding of Gojoseon. The Bronze Age is considered to have begun c. 2000 BCE in North Korea, while South Korean archaeologists estimate it around a millennium or more later.

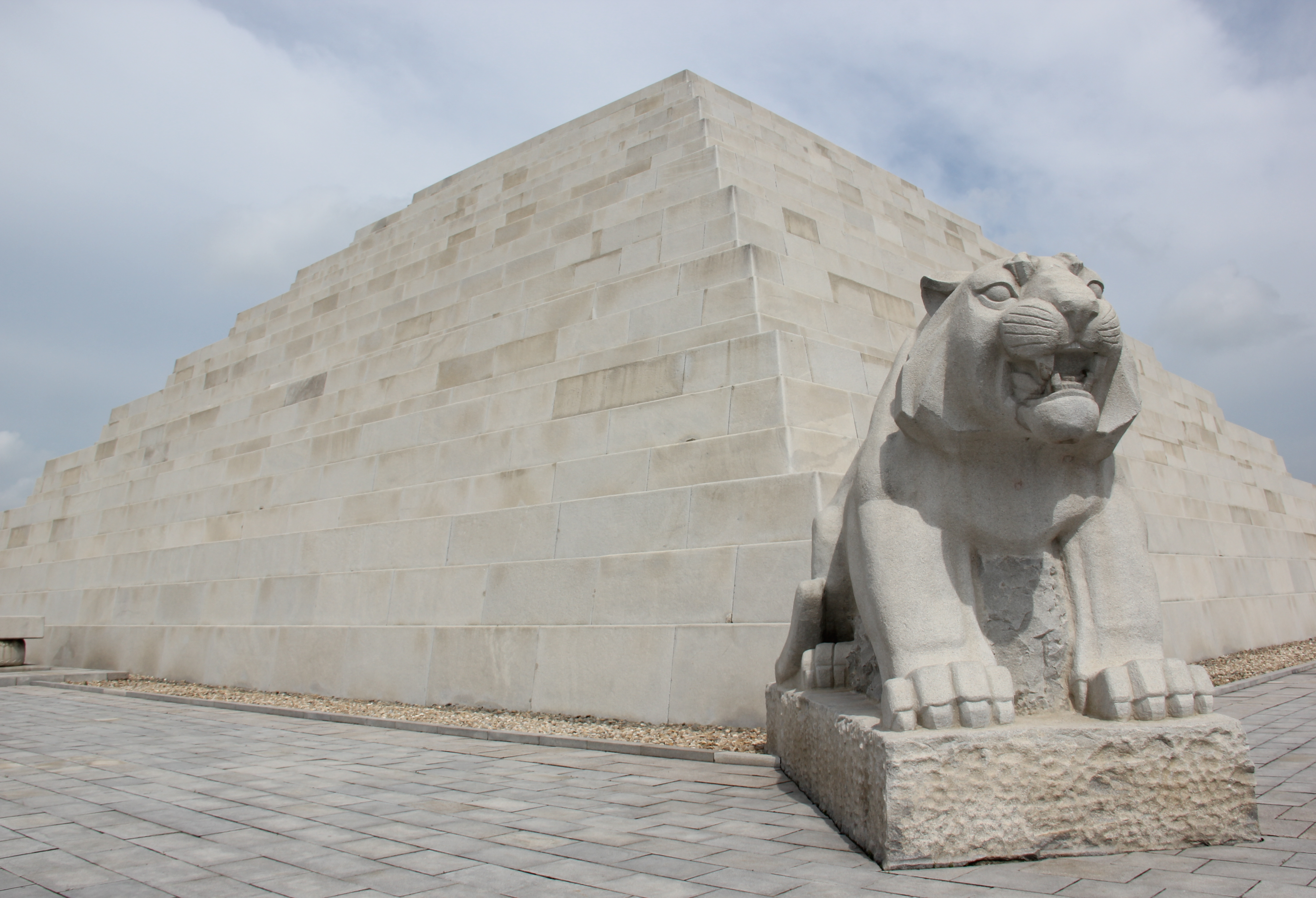
The modern Mausoleum of Tangun, the mythical founder of Gojoseon, built at the site of his purported tomb

Following the work of the historian Ri Chirin during the 1960s, North Korean scholars generally regard the story of Gija, a semi-legendary Shang dynasty noble who allegedly journeyed east and founded Gija Joseon around the 11th century BCE, as a later Chinese fabrication. In contrast, some South Korean historians interpret his migration as a historical event. However, North Korean archaeologists have been more sympathetic to the historicity of the legendary king and deity Dangun, said to have founded Gojoseon in 2333 BCE. In 1994, archaeologists found a pyramidal tomb with several enclosed skeletons near Pyongyang; the North Korean government announced that it had found the Tomb of Tangun, and that its discovery "demonstrated" the ancient origins of the Korean people. Although the tomb resembled Goguryeo-era tombs, this was suggested to be the result of later repairs.

== Institutions and publications ==
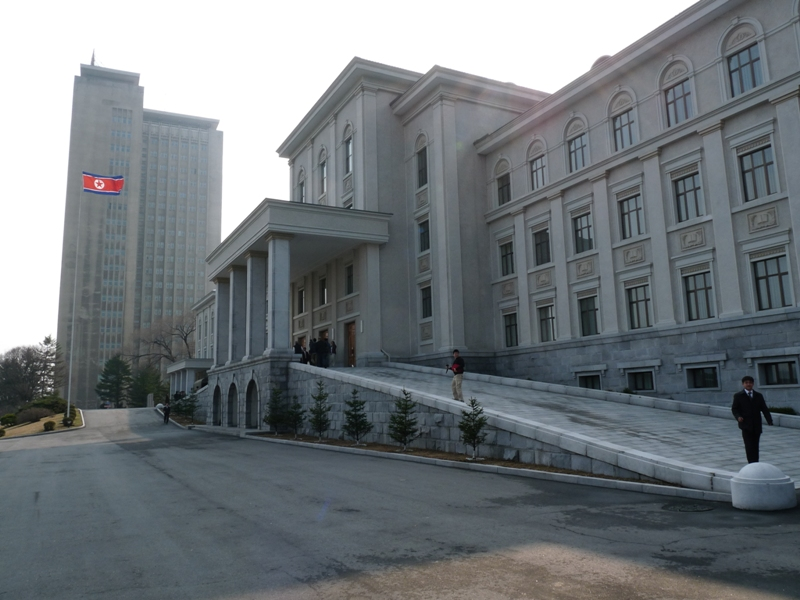
Kim Il Sung University in Pyongyang offers degrees in archaeology and maintains an archaeology journal.

The Institute of Archaeology of the Academy of Social Sciences and the Faculty of History at Kim Il Sung University both offer degrees in archaeology, carry out research excavations, and publish their own academic journals. Researchers at the Joseon Folk Museum, Korean Central History Museum, Cultural Preservation Institute, and University of Construction and Building Materials have also been known to publish archaeological research articles. The Academy of Social Sciences also publishes research monographs.

The first North Korean archaeological journal was Munhwa yusan ('Cultural Heritage'), published in Pyongyang from 1957 to 1962. The following year, it was superseded by another journal, Kogo minsok ('Archaeology and Ethnography'). Joseon gogo yeongu ('Korean Archaeological Research') is now the primary North Korean academic journal covering archaeology, published uninterrupted by the Institute of Archaeology since 1986. It featured 1,656 articles between its initial issue and 2019, not including its annual indices. Most articles within the journal are research articles, although excavation and site reports, alongside smaller numbers of transcribed lectures, data sets, news articles, and pieces of political rhetoric. Political pieces in Joseon gogo yeongu are relatively infrequent in comparison to those in the Ryeoksa gwahak ('Historical Science'), a history journal published by the Academy of Social Sciences which also occasionally includes archaeological research.

The Faculty of History at Kim Il Sung University also maintains its own journal, Kim Il Seong jonghap daehak hakbo—ryeoksa-beomnyul/ryeoksahak ('Journal of Kim Il Sung University—History-Law/History'), which contains articles on archaeology alongside other history topics. While archaeologists at Kim Il Sung University often publish in the Joseon gogo yeongu, it is unknown if archaeologists from other universities can publish in the Kil Il Seong jonghap daehak hakbo. Archaeology articles are also found within a variety of other North Korean academic journals, including Minjok munhwa yusan ('Our People's Cultural Heritage'), Ryeoksa jemunje ('Questions of History'), and Joseon geonchuk ('Joseon Architecture').
