= List of archaeological sites in Korea =

This is a partial list of archeological sites in Korea, including both North and South Korea.

- Acha Mountain Fortress, in Gwangjin-gu, Seoul, South Korea
- Anak Tomb No.3, in Anak, South Hwanghae, North Korea
- Anapji, in Gyeongju, South Korea
- Bangudae Petroglyphs, in Ulsan, South Korea
- Banwolseong, in Gyeongju, South Korea
- Daepyeong, in Jinju, South Korea
- Gangjingun Kiln Sites, in Gangjin, South Korea
- Goguryeo tombs, in Nampho and Pyongyang, North Korea
- Gold Crown Tomb, in Gyeongju, South Korea
- Gyeongju Historic Areas, in Gyeongju, South Korea
- Heavenly Horse Tomb, in Gyeongju, South Korea
- Hwangnyongsa, in Gyeongju, South Korea
- Igeum-dong site, in Sacheon, South Korea
- Jeongok-ri site, in Yeoncheon, South Korea
- Komun Moru, in Sangwon County, Pyongyang, North Korea
- Mireuksa, in Iksan, South Korea
- Nakrang tombs, in the vicinity of Pyongyang, North Korea
- Poseokjeong, in Gyeongju, South Korea
- Pungnap Toseong (Pungnap Earthen Fortress), in Songpa-gu, Seoul, South Korea
- Songgung-ni, in Buyeo-gun, Chungcheong Nam-do, South Korea
- Tomb of King Muryeong, in Buyeo, South Korea

== See also ==
- List of archaeological sites sorted by country
