= Goguryeo tombs =

UNESCO World Heritage Site
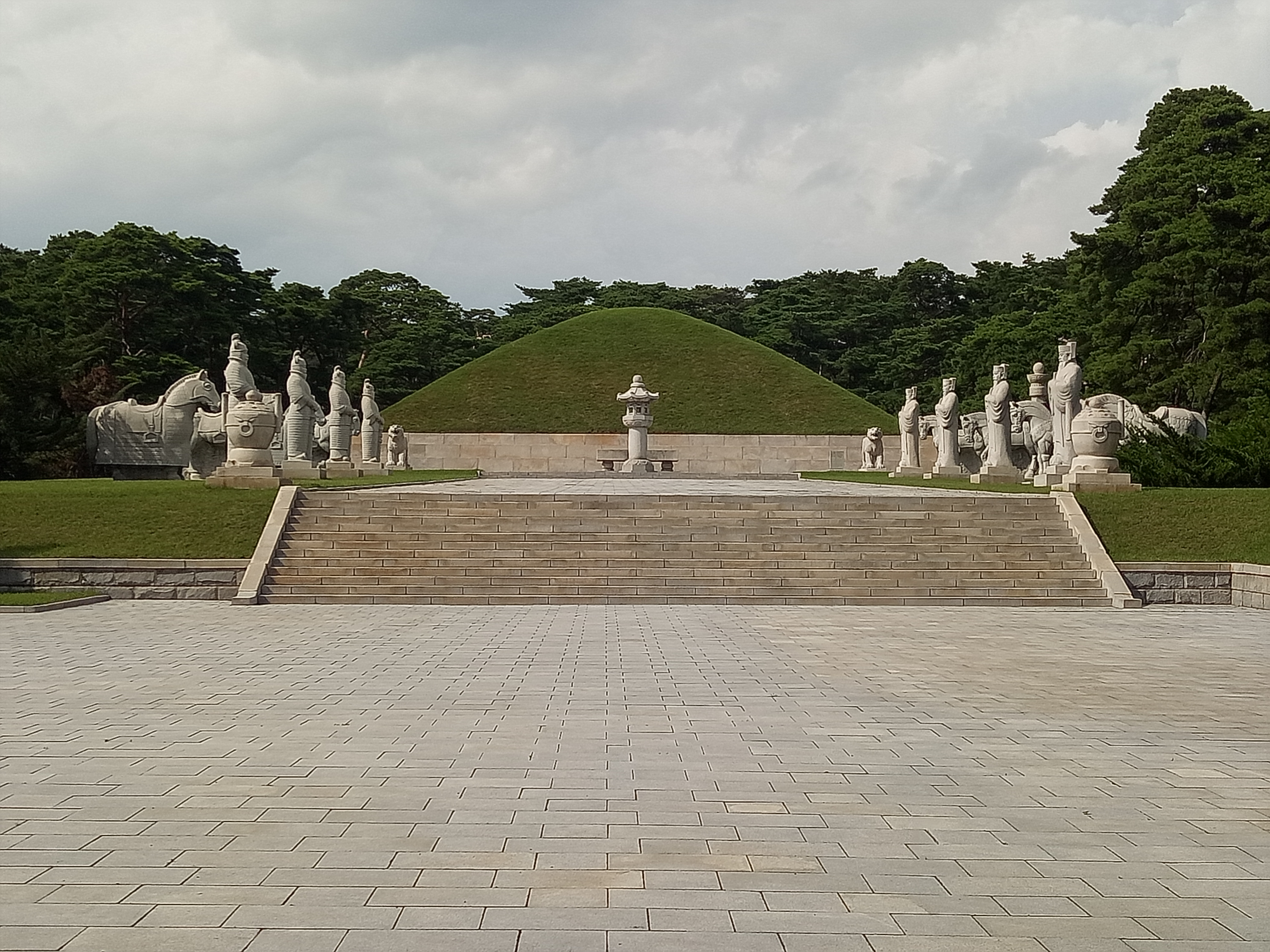
- Tomb of King Tongmyong

- Location within North Korea
- Official name: Complex of Koguryo Tombs
- Location: South Pyongan Province, South Hwanghae Province, North Korea
- Includes: Tomb of King Tongmyong; Jinpha-ri group of tombs; Nos. 1; 4; Homam-ri Sasin (Four Deities) Tomb; Tokhwa-ri Tombs; Nos. 1; 2; 3; Kangso Three Tombs; Tokhung-ri Tomb; Yaksu-ri Tomb; Susan-ri Tomb; Ryonggang Great Tomb; Twin-Column Tomb; Anak Tombs; Nos. 1; 2; 3
- Criteria: Cultural: (i), (ii), (iii), (iv)
- Reference: 1091
- Inscription: 2004 (28th Session)
- Area: 232.9 ha (0.899 sq mi)
- Buffer zone: 1,701.2 ha (6.568 sq mi)
- Coordinates: 38°51′47″N 125°24′54″E

- Goguryeo tombs
- Hangul: 고구려 고분군
- Hanja: 高句麗古墳群
- RR: Goguryeo gobungun
- MR: Koguryŏ kobun'gun

Goguryeo tombs, officially designated as the Complex of Koguryo Tombs (Korean: 고구려 고분군), are tombs in North Korea. In July 2004, they became the first UNESCO World Heritage site in the country. The site consists of 30 individual tombs from the later Goguryeo kingdom, one of Three Kingdoms of Korea, located in the cities of P'yŏngyang and Namp'o. Goguryeo was one of the strongest ancient Korean kingdoms located in the northern and central parts of the Korean Peninsula and the southern and central parts of Manchuria. The kingdom was founded in the present day area of North Korea, and part of Manchuria around 37 BCE, and the capital was transferred to P'yŏngyang in 427 CE.

Many of the tombs, such as the Anak Tomb No. 3, have wall paintings. The tombs are almost all of the Goguryeo culture that survives. There are over 10,000 Goguryeo tombs overall, but only about 90 of those unearthed in China and Korea have wall paintings. The Complex of Goguryeo Tombs inscribed on the World Heritage List contains the majority of these tombs with wall paintings. It is thought that the complex was used as a burial site for kings, queens and other members of the royal family. The paintings found on the tombs offer a unique insight into the everyday life of the Goguryeo period. The group includes the Tomb of King Tongmyong.

The murals are strongly coloured and show daily life and mythology of the time. By 2005, 70 murals had been found, mostly in the Taedong river basin near Pyongyang, the Anak area in South Hwanghae province, and in Ji'an in China's Jilin province.

The following criteria were considered by UNESCO to merit the Goguryeo tombs' inscription as a World Heritage site:

- The wall paintings are masterpieces of the Goguryeo period. The tombs themselves reflect ingenious engineering capabilities.
- The site offers exceptional insights into the Goguryeo culture, both into everyday life and burial customs.
- The Goguryeo tombs are an important example of this burial typology.

In May 2006, 2,360 individual tombs were discovered at the site of the ancient Goguryeo kingdom during work on the Yunfeng Reservoir. Ruins of an ancient city were discovered as well. Among the ruins was a city wall that was 1.5 meters tall and four meters wide. Evidence also suggested the presence of a moat. A dozen tombs were found within the city.

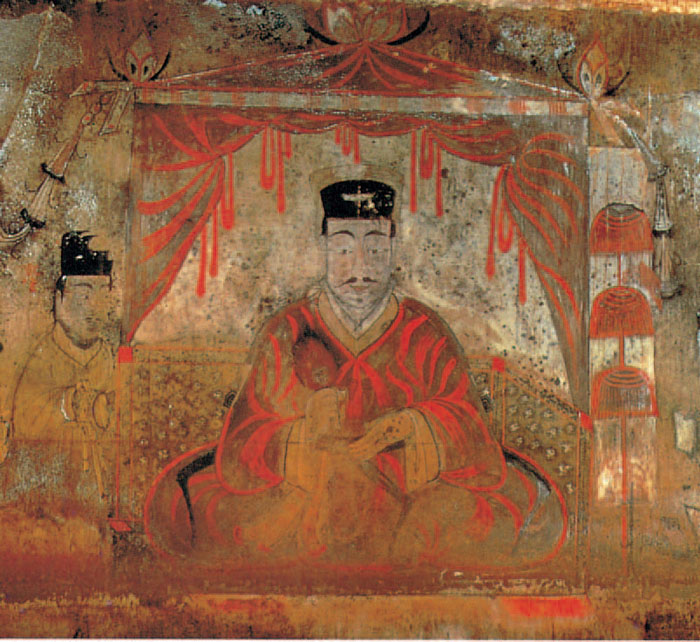
The mural of Goguryeo and former Yan official, Dong Shou (Hanja: 佟壽) in Anak Tomb No. 3

== See also ==
- List of archaeological sites in Korea
- Capital Cities and Tombs of the Ancient Koguryo Kingdom, UNESCO world heritage site in Goguryeo's Chinese half
- Ancient Tombs at Longtou Mountain with Mausoleum of Princess Jeonghyo of Balhae, the kingdom that succeeded Goguryeo
- Taoism
- Korean art
- Korean painting
- History of Korea
