= Anak County =

Anak County 안악군
- County

Korean transcription(s)
  - Hanja: 安岳郡
  - McCune–Reischauer: Anak-gun
  - Revised Romanization: Anak-gun
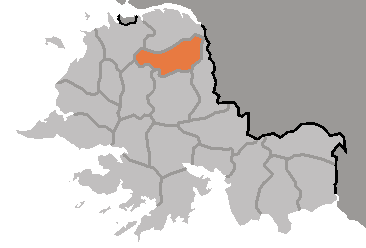
- Coordinates: 38°30′42″N 125°29′10″E
- Country: North Korea
- Province: South Hwanghae Province
- Administrative divisions: 1 ŭp, 26 ri

Area
  - Total: 398.5 km^{2} (153.9 sq mi)

Population (2008)
  - Total: 125,924
  - Density: 316.0/km^{2} (818.4/sq mi)

Anak County is a county in South Hwanghae Province, North Korea.

== Geography ==
Anak is bordered to the east by Chaeryŏng, to the south by Sinch'ŏn, to the west by Samch'ŏn and Ŭnryul and to the north by Ŭnch'ŏn. Anak is generally flat, though it becomes more mountainous to the west. The highest point is Mt. Kuwŏl, at 954 meters.

Anak is very famous for its Koguryo-era tombs, the most famous of which is Anak Tomb No. 3. All of them are registered as part of the Complex of Koguryo Tombs UNESCO World Heritage Site. The county is also home to the famous Wŏljŏngsa Buddhist temple, founded in 846.

== History ==
=== Ancient ===
Comb-patterned earthenware and stone tools from the early Neolithic period were excavated from shell mounds in Jangwol-ri, Angok-myeon and Panori in Anak-eup, confirming that Anak had been the home of people from an early age.In addition, two dwellings from the Bronze Age were excavated in Baksa-ri, Daewon-myeon, and relics from the Bronze Age such as dolmens, stone swords, stone knives, half-moon swords, stone axes, and stone coins were found here and there.In Baksa-ri, many artifacts from the early Iron Age have been excavated, and the culture has been passed down from the prehistoric age to the historical age. It was the territory of Goguryeo during the Three Kingdoms period, and after the unification of the Three Kingdoms, it was incorporated into the territory of Silla and organized into Yangak County(楊岳郡) in 757 (King Gyeongdeok 16). The ancient tombs No. 1, 2, and 3 of Anak in Sangsan-ri, Daewon-myeon and Yusun-ri, Yongsun-myeon, which are famous for their murals, represent the level of culture of the Goguryeo period in the 4th century. In particular, Tomb No. 3 has a wall of 81 m^{2} and a ceiling of 58 m^{2} filled with various figures and genre paintings, depicting customs of Goguryeo as well as music and house structure.

=== Koryo dynasty ===
Wang Geon's powers cooperated with Gung Ye to be incorporated into Taebong's territory around 905, and it is presumed that it was around this time that the name of the place was changed to Anak. In 1018 (9th year of King Hyeonjong), it became a subcounty of Pungju, and in 1106 (1st year of King Yejong), as the number of wanderers without a fixed residence increased, Gammu was appointed to calm down the residents.

In 1259 (Gojong 46), it was invaded by the Mongol army and surrendered.In 1270, it became part of Dongnyeong prefectures, but was restored to its original subdivision after 8 years. Even after the mid-14th century, it was damaged several times due to invasions by the Red Turbans and Japanese pirates. In 1348 (the 4th year of King Chungmok's reign), as the region was reported as the home town of the wife of Munhachanseongsa, Hwangsun (黃順), the region was promoted to county, and was the post of Jigunsa (知郡事) was appointed.

=== Joseon dynasty ===
It was confirmed as a county in 1413 (13th year of King Taejong) and the head of the county was appointed. According to the geography of the 『Veritable records of King Sejong』, the number of households in the mid-15th century was relatively small, with 991 households and 3,703 people. Even in the early Joseon Dynasty, the life of the residents did not expand significantly, and in the mid-16th century, it became the main activity base of Im Kkeokjeong, who was active around Mount Kuwolsan.

Administratively, in addition to the period from 1589 (the 22nd year of King Seonjo) to 1608, it went through several ups and downs of being demoted to a prefecture. During the Japanese Invasion of Korea in 1592, when the Japanese army stationed in Kuwolsan was attacked by the Ming Dynasty army and retreated, he raised a righteous army and attacked it, making a contribution.

Even in the 17th century, many bandits gathered in Mt. Kuwol, so in 1684 (the 10th year of King Sukjong's reign), Jungyeongjang (中營將), who had been stationed in Sincheon, was moved to Anak, and Junggun (中軍) was assigned to take on the duties of Toposa. However, since then, agriculture has greatly developed, centering on rice and cotton cultivation, reclamation projects have been actively carried out, and trade with the Pyeongan Province has increased.

In 1759 (35th year of King Yeongjo), all of them were organized into 18 rooms and 80 ri, indicating that the military force had grown significantly, and the number of households was 14,509 households and 51,247, second only to Haeju in the province. The population in 1828 (Sunjo 28) was 53,546.

=== Late Joseon period and colonial period ===
In 1894, Donghak troops of this county gathered together at Paeyeopsa Temple (貝葉寺) along with Donghak troops from Haeju and Sincheon, but collapsed due to an attack by the same Donghak army, Lee Dong-yeop (李東燁) unit.

This revolutionary spirit was actively accepted through Catholicism and Protestantism, while educational and cultural organizations such as the Myunhakhoe actively accepted Shinmunmyeong. In January 1911, Japan was hit again by manipulating the so-called 'Anak Incident'.

At that time, about 160 people, including Kim Gu, Kim Hong-ryang, Kim Yong-je, and Choi Myeong-sik, were imprisoned, which was a precursor to the 105 Persons Incident that occurred in the fall of that year. Due to Kim Gu's position as a teacher at Yangsan School, many figures from the region, including Kim Gi-hyung, Na Tae-seop, Oh Myeon-shik, and Choi Ik-hyeong, were active in the Provisional Government. In 1935, 1 eup, 8 myeons, and 113 villages were organized, and in 1942, there were 104,572 households in 19,030 households.

=== After liberation ===
In 1952, when administrative districts were reorganized, Sancheon-myeon, Yongjin-myeon, and Nowol-myeon of Sinchon County, Anak-eup of Anak County, and Yongsun-myeon was reorganized into Daewon-myeon and Munsan-myeon. In 1954, Hwanghae Province was divided into North and South, leading the region to become part of South Hwanghae Province.

== Transportation ==
The county is accessible only by road.

== Administrative divisions ==
The county is divided into one town (ŭp) and 26 villages (ri).

	Chosŏn'gŭl	Hancha
Anak-ŭp	안악읍	安岳邑
Hanwŏl-li	한월리	漢月里
Kangsal-li	강산리	江山里
Kulsal-li	굴산리	屈山里
Kŭmgang-ri	금강리	金岡里
Kuwa-ri	구와리	九瓦里
Kyŏngji-ri	경지리	境地里
Mamyŏng-ri	마명리	馬鳴里
Namjŏng-ri	남정리	南井里
O'gung-ri	오국리	五局里
Omgot-ri	엄곳리	嚴串里
P'aeyŏp-ri	패엽리	貝葉里
P'allyung-ri	판륙리	板六里
Poksa-ri	복사리	伏獅里
Pongsŏng-ri	봉성리	鳳城里
P'yŏngjŏng-ri	평정리	坪井里
Roam-ri	로암리	路岩里
Ryongsal-li	룡산리	龍山里
Sinch'ol-li	신촌리	新村里
Taech'u-ri	대추리	大楸里
Tŏksŏng-ri	덕성리	德成里
Wŏljŏng-ri	월정리	月精里
Wŏlji-ri	월지리	月池里
Wŏlsal-li	월산리	月山里
Wŏllyong-ri	원룡리	元龍里
Yŏndŭng-ri	연등리	燃登里
Yusŏng-ri	유성리	楡城里

== See also ==
- Geography of North Korea
- Administrative divisions of North Korea
