= Im Kkeokjeong =

Korean rebel leader (1521–1562)

Im Kkeok-jeong (Korean: 임꺽정; Hanja: 林巪正; 1521–1562 (Note: In the lunar calendar, Im died on 3 January 1562)) was the leader of a peasant rebellion in the Hwanghae Province during 1559 to 1562, which started due to heavy taxation. His organisation, the Noklimdang, started off as a small group, but grew as they began killing the rich and giving food to the poor. The group of thieves eventually grew to a few hundred. In addition, the group had a wooden castle built. He was also known by other names such as Im Geo-jeong (임거정; 林巨正) and Im Geo-jil-jeong (임거질정; 林巨叱正). Along with Hong Gil-dong and Jang Gil-san, he is sometimes referred to as one of the three great thieves of Joseon, and also considered as one of the four great thieves including Jeon Woo-chi.

== Biography ==
Im was born to a butcher of Baekjeong status from Yangju, Gyeonggi Province, but the exact family clan is unknown. It is estimated that there was a nobleman with the surname Im (임; 林) among his ancestors, but it is not accurate.

According to a local legend in Yangju County, Junae, his father was a butcher, so he was treated condescendingly by the villagers and was not even allowed to drink water from the local well. So it was said that Im Kkeok-jeong went to Mt. Bulgok, Yangju, a little far from his house, and drank the flowing water. According to one theory, he became a bandit after his father was murdered by a provincial governor, but the exact reason why he became a thief is unknown. On the other hand, Hong Gil-dong, who is comparable to him, was active two generations before him, Jeon Woo-chi was a contemporary of him, and Jang Gil-san was active around the time of King Sukjong.

During the reigns of King Jungjong and King Myeongjong, he was widely active in Yangju and Cheorwon, Bongsan County and Haeju in Hwanghae Province, and Guwolsan. When the public sentiment became bitter due to political confusion and corruption of officials, he rallied the disgruntled elements and plundered private houses, but the servants and the people did not help. Starting in 1559 (the 14th year of King Myeongjong), they set mountains such as Mt. Guwol in Hwanghae Province as their hiding places, raided government offices in Hwanghae Province and Gyeonggi Province, killed officials, robbed warehouses of government offices, stole grain and jewelry, and supplied grain to the poor. In Hwanghae Province, Jangyeon County, Ongjin County, and Pungcheon County all tried to subdue them, but the people resisted or informed them in advance, so they were able to avoid it.

Generals of the Joseon dynasty at the time, such as Yi Eok-geun, Nam Chi-geun, and Lee Heum-rye, the governor of Kaesong, tried to arrest him, but he repeatedly escaped without being arrested. While the power gradually declined from 1560 (15th year of King Myeongjong), in the first month of the lunar calendar in 1562 (17th year of King Myeongjong), due to a large-scale subjugation operation by the government forces, he withdrew to Mt. Guwol and fought from there. He later died on same year.

== Legacy ==
Im Kkokjong became an inspiration for the fictional character of Hong Gildong, subject of Hong Gildong jeon, often considered the first Korean novel.

== Popular culture ==
=== Literature ===
- Im Kkokjong - novel by the North Korean writer Hong Myong-Hui

=== Film and television ===
- Portrayed by Cheong Hung-chae in the 1996 SBS TV series Im Kkokjong.
- Portrayed by Kwon Hyun-sang in the 2013 KBS2 TV series The Fugitive of Joseon.
- Portrayed by Song Won-seok in the 2019 TV Chosun TV series Joseon Survival Period.
