= Mausoleum of Tangun =

Ancient burial site in Kangdong, North Korea

Coordinates: 39.154782°N 126.054382°E

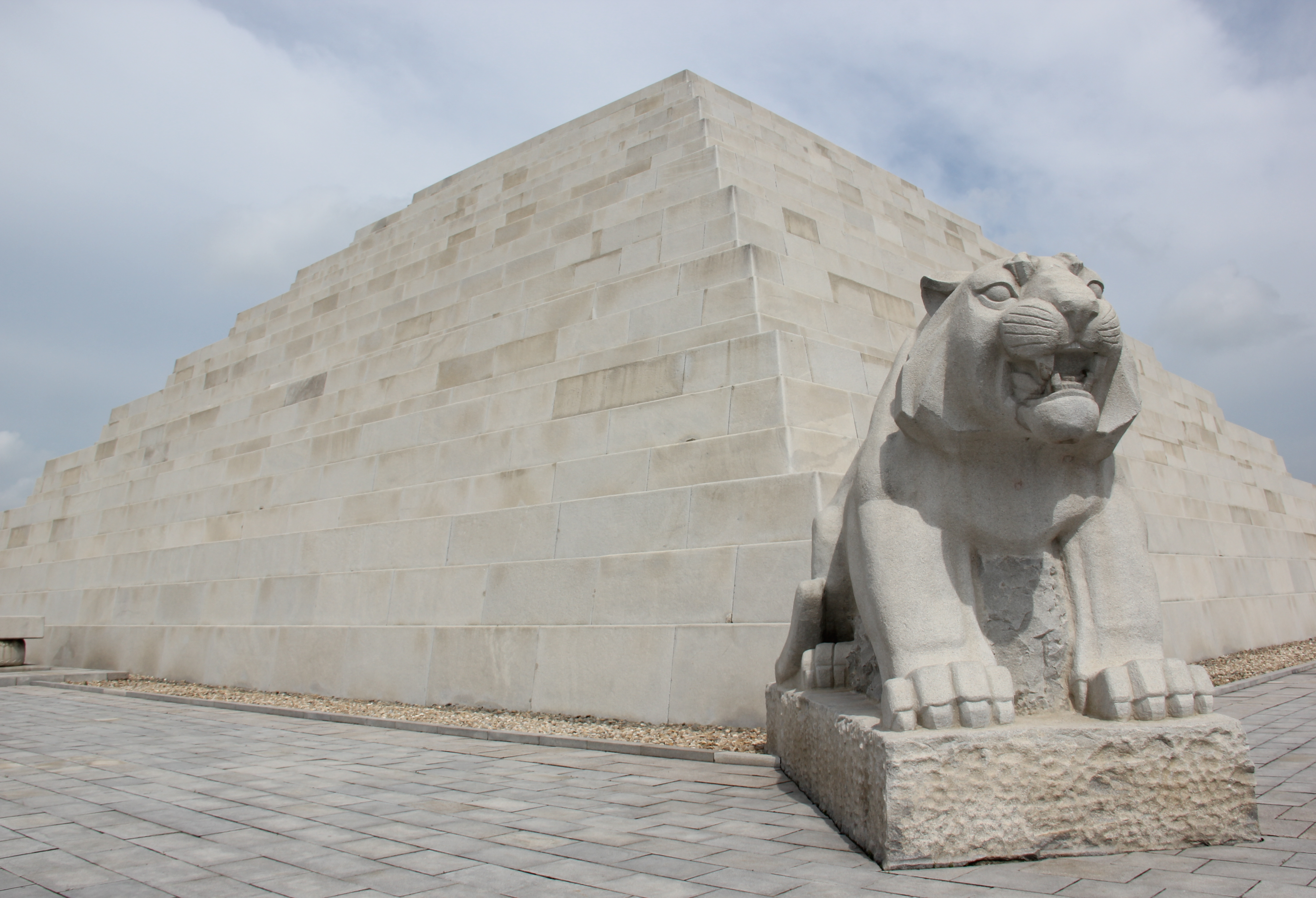
- The Mausoleum of Tangun

Korean name
- Hangul: 단군릉
- Hanja: 檀君陵
- Revised Romanization: Dangunneung
- McCune–Reischauer: Tan'gunnŭng

The Mausoleum of Tangun (Korean: 단군릉; Hanja: 檀君陵) is an ancient burial site in Kangdong near Pyongyang, North Korea. It is claimed by North Korea to be the tomb of Tangun, founder of Gojoseon, the first Korean kingdom.

A pyramid was built on top of the grave in 1994, consisting of 1994 blocks of stone. The complex occupies about 1.8 km² (.70 mi²) on the slope of Mount Taebak (대박산). The complex is divided into three major sections: restoration work area, stone statue area, and the burial site. Dangun's grave is shaped like a step pyramid, about 22 m (72 ft) high and 50 m (164 ft) on each side.

According to the Samguk Yusa, Gojoseon was thought to have been founded in 2333 BCE. North Koreans claim that their current excavations have dramatically changed the estimates of North Korean historians back to at least 3000 BCE, making the site c.5011 years old (±267 years in 1993).

== Background ==
North Korea's leader Kim Il Sung insisted that Dangun was not merely a legend but a real historical person. As consequence, North Korean archaeologists were compelled to locate the purported remains and grave of Dangun. In the October of 1993, through the thesis called the "Excavation reports of the mausoleum of Dangun(단군릉발굴보고)", North Korean academia announced that 86 human bone remains were found that can be traced to two individuals, one man and the other woman, and by dating the bone of the man using the method of electron spin resonance dating, it was found to be from more than 5011 years ago.

== Controversy ==
A nail found in the mausoleum, dating to the Goguryeo period (37 BCE-668 CE), has been the subject of much controversy. This discovery has thus led some North Korean historians to conclude that the mausoleum was discovered and renovated during that period. Many observers and historians outside of North Korea, including South Korea, consider the data and the interpretation compromised by politics and nationalism. North Korea has permitted no independent testing to resolve the questions over authenticity and dating. South Korean historians think it's more likely to be a tomb of a regional power during the Goguryeo kingdom based on the artifacts found at the site.

== See also ==
- List of tombs and mausoleums
- List of archeological sites in Korea
- History of Korea
- Mausoleum of the Yellow Emperor
