= Woljongsa (Anak) =

Buddhist temple in North Korea

Coordinates: 38.4561°N 125.2992°E

- Hangul: 월정사
- Hanja: 月精寺
- RR: Woljeongsa
- MR: Wŏlchŏngsa

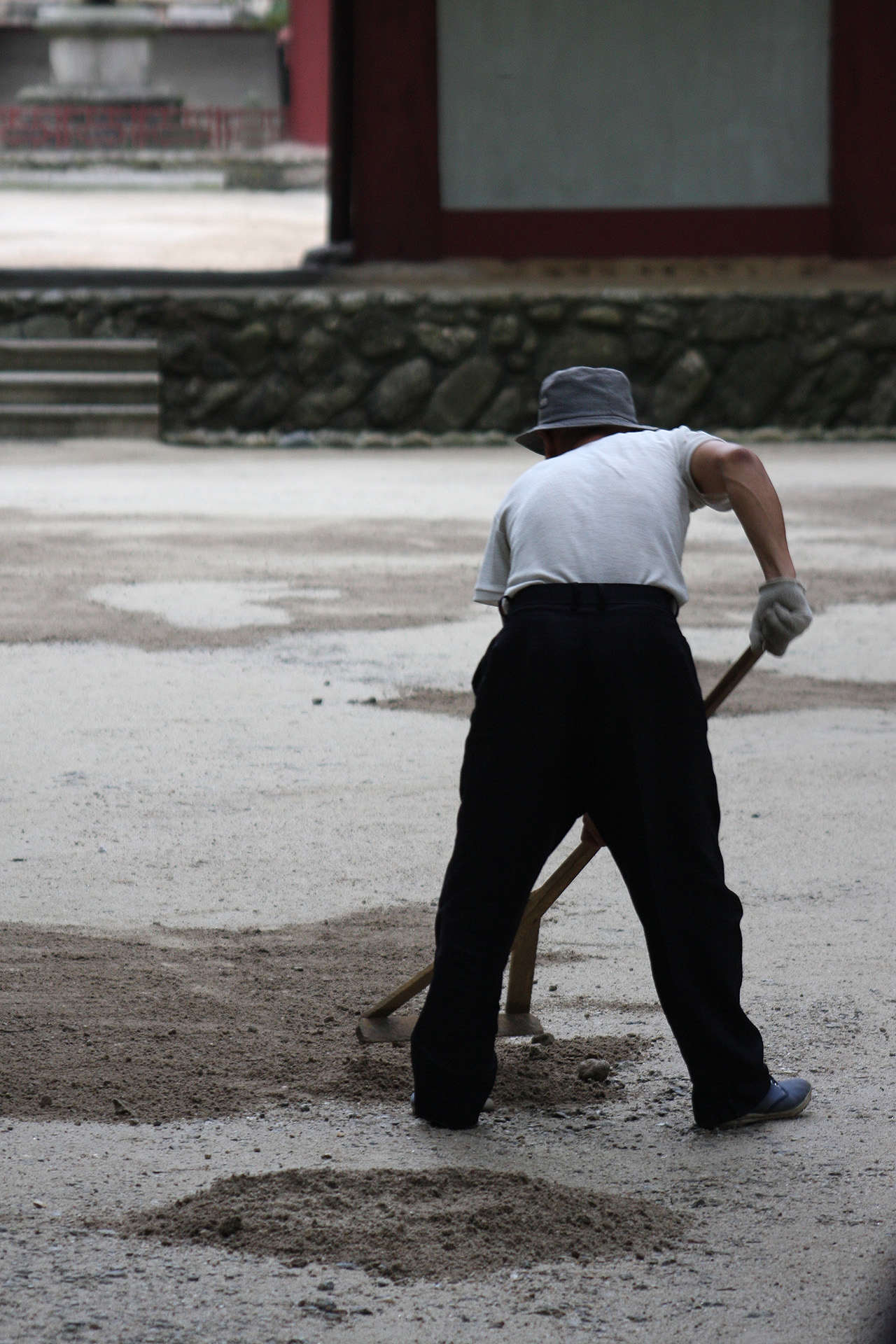
A worker in Woljong Buddhist temple

The Anak Woljongsa is a historic Buddhist temple, one of the National Treasures of North Korea (#75). It is located in Woljong-ni, Anak County, South Hwanghae Province. It is located near Mt. Kuwol.

== History and description ==
The temple is named after Woljong, a Buddhist priest who built the temple. Dating from the Koguryo period, it was rebuilt during the Joseon dynasty. The site includes the Manse Pavilion, Myongbu Temple, Suwol Hall and other accessory buildings around Kuknakbo Hall.

Construction first started in 846 with further additions during the Joseon period.

Kungnakbo Hall is at the centre of the structure; along the north–south axis of the structure linking Kungnakbo and the Manse Pavilion are Myongbu Hall to the east and Suwol Hall to the west. Kungnakbo is a double-eaved gabled house with a curved roof with potbellied pillars and unique bracket decorations not found elsewhere in the structure. The eaves of the roof protrude 2.5 meters, supported by angled rafters. Inside, the ceiling is set as low as the height of the beams.

The Manse Pavilion is a gabled house with five bays (measuring 11.72 meters) by two bays (measuring 6.02 meters). The loft-like Manse is built on a slope, its floor supported by 1.2-meter-high (3.9 ft) stone pillars. The front and each side of the building are walled with wooden boards, the rear of the Manse is open.

The site was visited by Kim Jong-il during the 1970s and 1980s.
