= Jinpa-ri Tomb No. 4 =

- Hangul: 진파리사호무덤
- Hanja: 眞坡里四號무덤
- RR: Jinpa-ri saho mudeom
- MR: Chinp'a-ri saho mudŏm

The Jinpa-ri Tomb No. 4 is noted for its depictions of all twenty-eight Chinese constellations as noted in Koguryo astronomical charts. The Tomb is listed as a National Treasure of North Korea.

The paintings in the Tomb do not show the names of the constellations, nor do they show the connecting lines between the stars (but research has identified these paintings as part of the twenty-eight Chinese constellations). The paintings of the constellations in this tomb do show modifications over their Chinese depictions: the direction of the arrangement of the twenty-eight constellations is counterclockwise and the reversal of the east and west constellations (seven constellations of the east have been placed in the west and the seven constellations of the west have been placed in the east). These differences are thought to be due to an error by the painters or because the reproductions of the astronomical directions were erroneous. The stars are painted various sizes, using the Korean tradition of indicating the brightness of the stars. There are 128 stars in total in the painting; some scholars have identified the Big Dipper and either one or several other constellations.

== Chemical Analysis of the Lime Plaster in the Tomb ==
A chemical substance and constituent mineral analysis of the lime plaster in the tomb has dated it to the middle of the 6th Century. Testing showed a white lime plaster layer made of lime and sand and a brown lime plaster layer made from a "clayish soil" of weathered rock and lime. Both types showed lump-typed clayish soil of weathered rock, lime and shell.

== See also ==
- Jinpa-ri Tomb No. 1
