= Tomb of King Tongmyong =

Mausoleum in Pyongyang, North Korea

Coordinates: 38°53′43.18″N 125°55′22.93″E

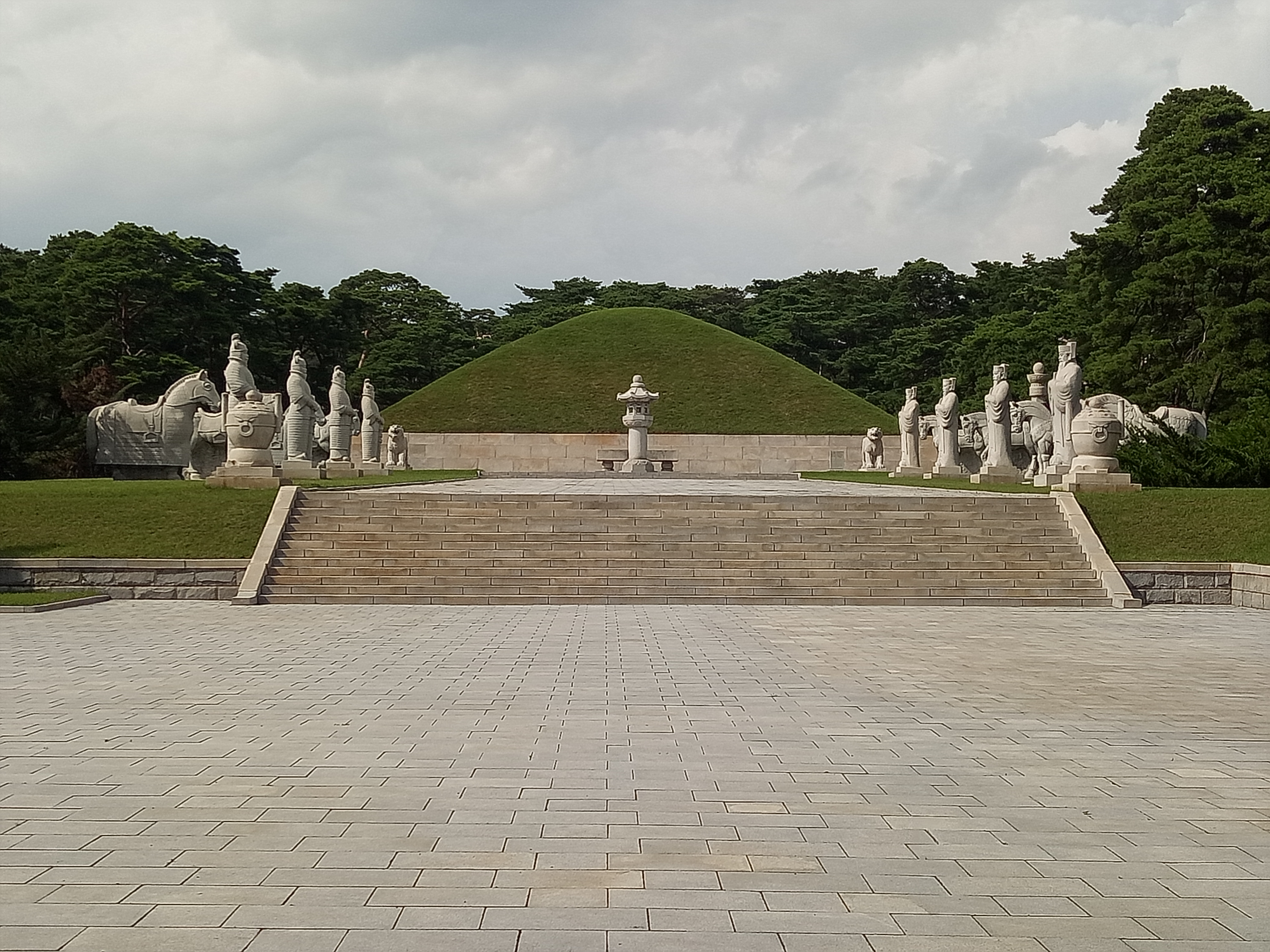
The tomb of King Tongmyŏng, Pyongyang.

The Tomb of King Tongmyŏng (Korean: 동명왕릉; Hanja: 東明王陵), also known as the Tomb of King Dongmyeong, is a mausoleum located in near Ryongsan Village, Ryokpo-guyok, Pyongyang, North Korea. One of the tombs is the royal tomb of Jumong (58–19 BC), the founder of the ancient Goguryeo Kingdom, the northernmost of the Three Kingdoms of Korea. King Jumong was given the posthumous name of King Dongmyeong. In total, there are 63 individual tombs of the period. The area around Dongmyeong's grave contains at least fifteen known tombs believed to belong to various vassal lords. The tomb has achieved World Heritage status as part of the Complex of Goguryeo Tombs inscribed by UNESCO in 2004 under Criteria (i), (ii), (iii) and (iv) covering an area of 233 hectares (580 acres) with a buffer zone of 1,701 hectares (4,200 acres). A unique feature of it and the other extant tombs in the area are the wall paintings depicting blossoming lotuses, indicative of Buddhism practiced and perhaps prevalent in Korea around 277 BC to 668 AD.

== History ==
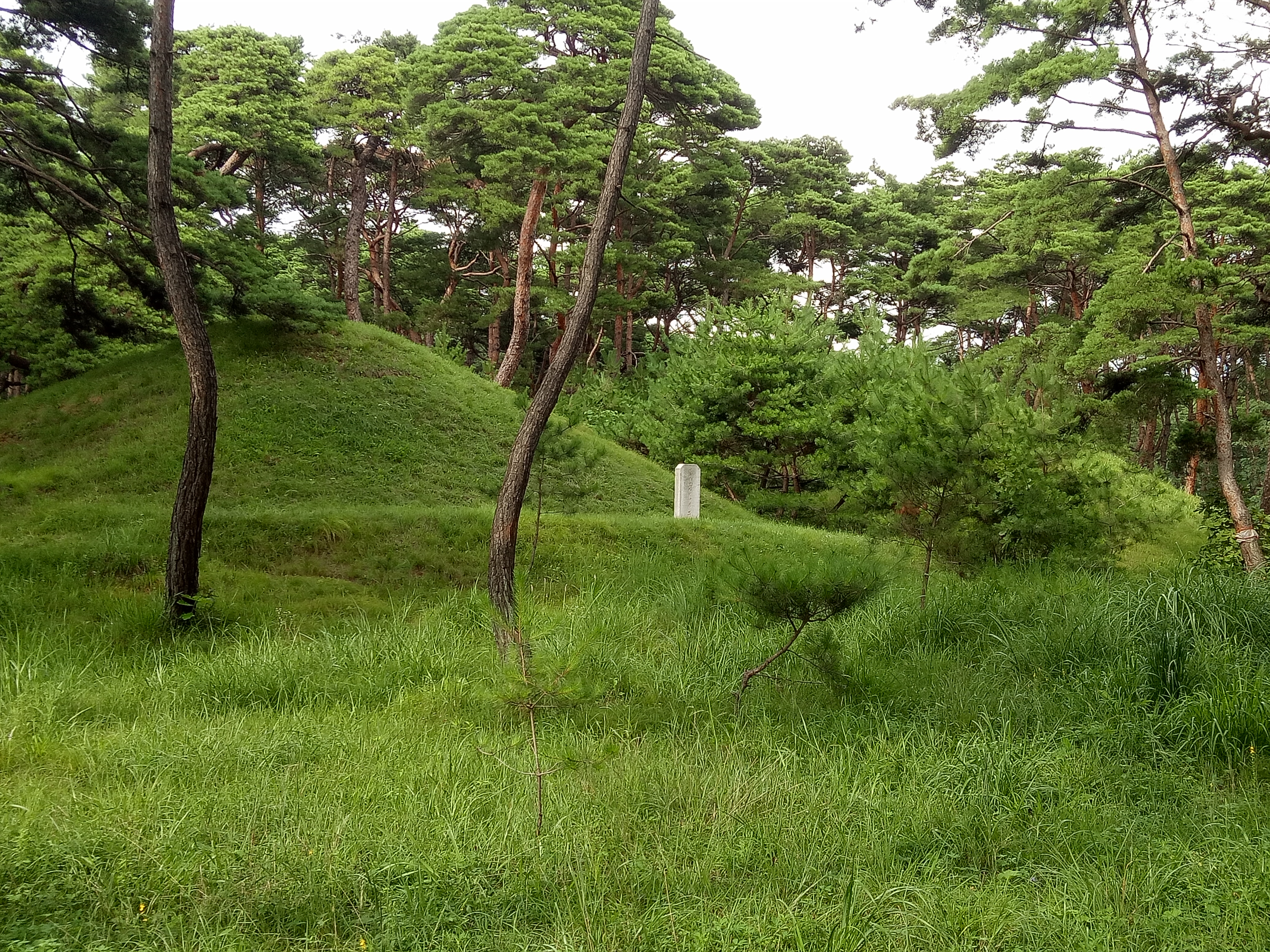
Royal burial tumuli within the mausoleum complex.

- Korean name
- Chosŏn'gŭl: 동명왕릉
- Hancha: 東明王陵
- Revised Romanization: Dongmyeongwangneung
- McCune–Reischauer: Tongmyŏngwangrŭng

The sacred site was built when King Jangsu transferred his capital from the Hwando Mountain Fortress to Pyongyang in 427 AD. The Royal Tomb of King Dongmyeong is one of 63 tombs that exist in five zones of North Korea. The construction of all these tombs is dated to the 5th and 6th centuries. Its history is traced to Goguryeo Kingdom which existed between 277 BC to 668 AD, initially in Huanren, Liaoning Province in China. It was then shifted to Gungnae Castle in 3 AD in Ji'an, Jilin Province, of China and later moved to the Mount Taesong area, in Pyongyang, in 427 AD. Its final location was to the present location at Jangan Castle in the center of Pyongyang. Goguryeo had five ancient tribes each with its own ancestral tomb observing rites celebrated during the tenth month of every year by performing the tongmyong ("petition to the east") which is the worship of a heavenly deity named Susin. Kiringul is situated 200 metres (660 ft) from the Yongmyong Temple in Moran Hill in Pyongyang. It is a rectangular rock which is carved with the inscription 'Unicorn Lair'. Based on the discovery of the King's unicorn lair, archaeologists of the History Institute of the DPRK Academy of Social Sciences inferred that Pyongyang was the capital city of Ancient Korea and concurrently of the Goguryeo Kingdom. In 1697, during the era of Sukjong of Joseon, the king endorsed a proposal to annually repair the Tomb of King Dongmyeong.

This and other tombs came to be publicised only after 1905, when Korea was occupied by the Japanese. The Japanese experts were instrumental in carrying out scientific research and documentation of the tombs from 1911 to the 1940s. The original tombs had been ransacked by tomb hunters and were found by the Japanese archaeologists during excavations carried out in 1941. After excavations it was renovated for political reasons.

The UNESCO recognition in 2004 for the tombs was accorded under: Criterion i for the artistic elegance of the wall paintings; Criterion ii as it brings out the burial practice of Koguryo which had an influence on other cultures in the region including Japan; Criterion iii as the wall paintings represent the history, religious beliefs, and customs of the people; and Criterion iv for providing a burial typology.

== Legend ==
The legend behind the King's birth is told in the third-century Chinese historical text Weilüe, which is now mostly lost. According to the legend the chambermaid of the Queen became pregnant when she was struck by a bolt of lightning. Then, the King, fearing that it was a supernatural event which could harm him, got the baby thrown into the pigsty. However, the baby survived on account of the breath support provided by the pigs. The baby was then thrown into a horse stable where he survived. Then realizing that the child was a divinity the King ordered his mother to bring him up. He was given the name Dongmyeong (Eastern Light) considering the events which led to his birth. He then went to build his own kingdom after overcoming all obstacles and attempts made on his life. He then declared himself the King of Buyeo.

== Political importance ==
One of two important rituals was instituted during the reign of Onjo of Baekje that involved Dongmyeong; the first stressed the royal family's connections with the Buyeo peoples of Manchuria through the presentations of sacrifices at a shrine dedicated to Dongmyeong.

The era of the Kingdom of Goguryeo is of particular interest for the North Korean government. According to Andrei Lankov, in the early 1970s, Kim Jong Il reportedly pointed to "a major shortcoming of North Korean archaeology: archaeologists had failed to locate the tomb of King Tongmyŏng". In 1974, North Korean archaeologists produced the required tomb which was duly 'restored' and became a tourist attraction. Although it was initially an authentic Goguryeo tomb known under the reference "Jinpari Tomb n°10", there is no further evidence that this tomb is King Dongmyeong's.

The alleged discovery of the burial place of the founding monarch of the Kingdom of Goguryeo was followed by an extensive "restoration" during the 1980s. The reconstruction process entailed the complete removal of all original buildings, structures, and monuments in order to create a new, white marble tomb. On 14 May 1993, the opening ceremony of the newly built tomb was attended by Kim Il Sung. Kim also wrote the calligraphy on the stele that is erected at the tomb and which has the name of the King of Buyeo inscribed on it. King Dongmyeong's tomb is of national heritage and its rebuilding and upkeep has been the responsibility of the state. Kim II-sung personally monitored the rebuilding of the tomb with funds provisioned by the state to make it “a historical cultural heritage to be handed down to the generation to come.”

In 2002, coins of 10 North Korean won denomination were issued depicting the tomb of the King.

== Architecture and fittings ==
The mausoleum is a 11.5 m (38 ft)-high tumulus bordered at the base with stone blocks. Each side of the tumulus is 34 m (112 ft) long. The tomb has a 22 m^{2} (240 sq ft) pyramidal inner chamber, a front chamber and a gallery made with stones. The chamber faces southwest. The renovated tomb of the king is the most prominent tomb and is one among the 20 tombs in Chinpa Village. The current tomb complex is quite modern.

The Royal Tomb of King Dongmyeong and the Three Tombs of Kangso have mural paintings. The Tomb of King Dongmyeong has Goguryeo murals which are known for its rich color and tone. The wall paintings found in the tomb were of Buddhist themes, namely the lotus, and the animal depictions in the ceiling and walls of the tombs. The murals depict, realistically in a three-dimensional form, the daily life scenes of people such as women dancing, warriors getting trained, birds flying in the sky covered with clouds, dragons, fish swimming in rivers, and wild life. The frescoes in the tomb depict lotuses in blossom with other religious ornamentation which bring out the traditional Buddhist ethos only and not the four traditional images of the constellations as in the Chinese tombs. This is inferred to represent the paradise in Buddhist religious parlance. The tomb has an inscription which substantiates the fact that it was a sacred site for festival rites. These consisted of the worship of mother earth and also livestock; the former is a south Asian rite while the latter is a shamanistic form of worship.

== Grounds ==
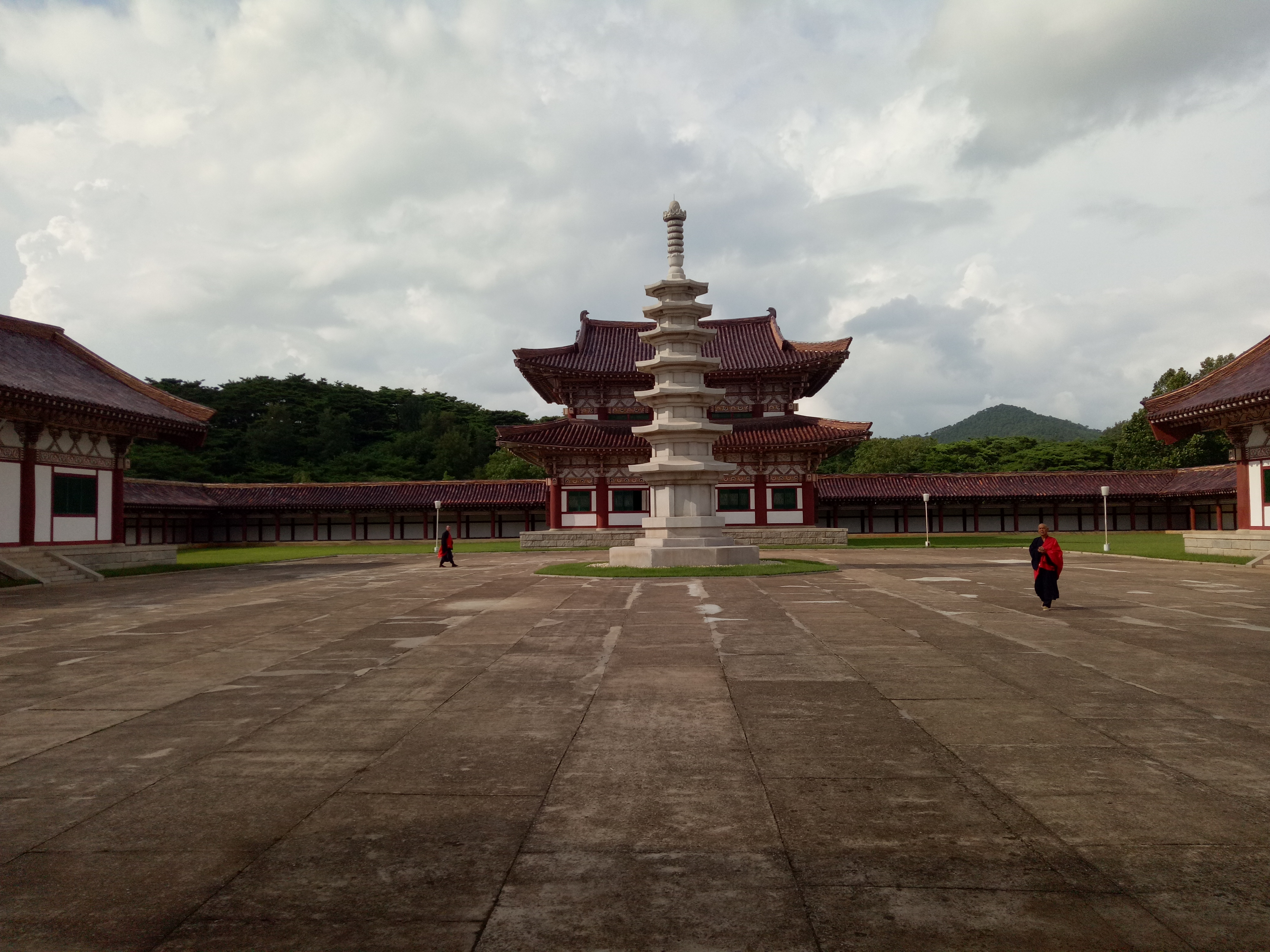
Chongrung Buddhist temple next to the Tomb of King Tongmyŏng

The grounds include a large grassy area which was one of the venues for the 13th World Festival of Youth and Students.

=== Buddhist monastery ===
The Buddhist monastery, discovered in 1978, is located about 120 metres (390 ft) from the tomb and was inferred as the monastery built by King Changsu (413–91) after the capital was moved to Pyongyang in 427 AD. The inscriptions found here proclaim that Changsu was the chief monk who conducted the rites at the tomb and also in the Buddhist monastery nearby. It has three halls surrounding the walls of a pagoda which is similar to Japanese temples built in later years, suggesting that the Buddhism culture of Goguryeo has also permeated to Japan. Goguryeo itself has been influenced by the Chinese Buddhism of the Northern Dynasties.

=== Chongrŭngsa Buddhist temple ===
The complex also houses the rebuilt Chongrŭngsa Buddhist temple, where funeral services were held for the deceased monarch. The temple, whose foundations were excavated in 1974, was rebuilt to mark the 2,300th anniversary of Tongmyŏng's birth.

== See also ==
- National Treasure (North Korea)
- Capital Cities and Tombs of the Ancient Goguryeo Kingdom

== Gallery ==
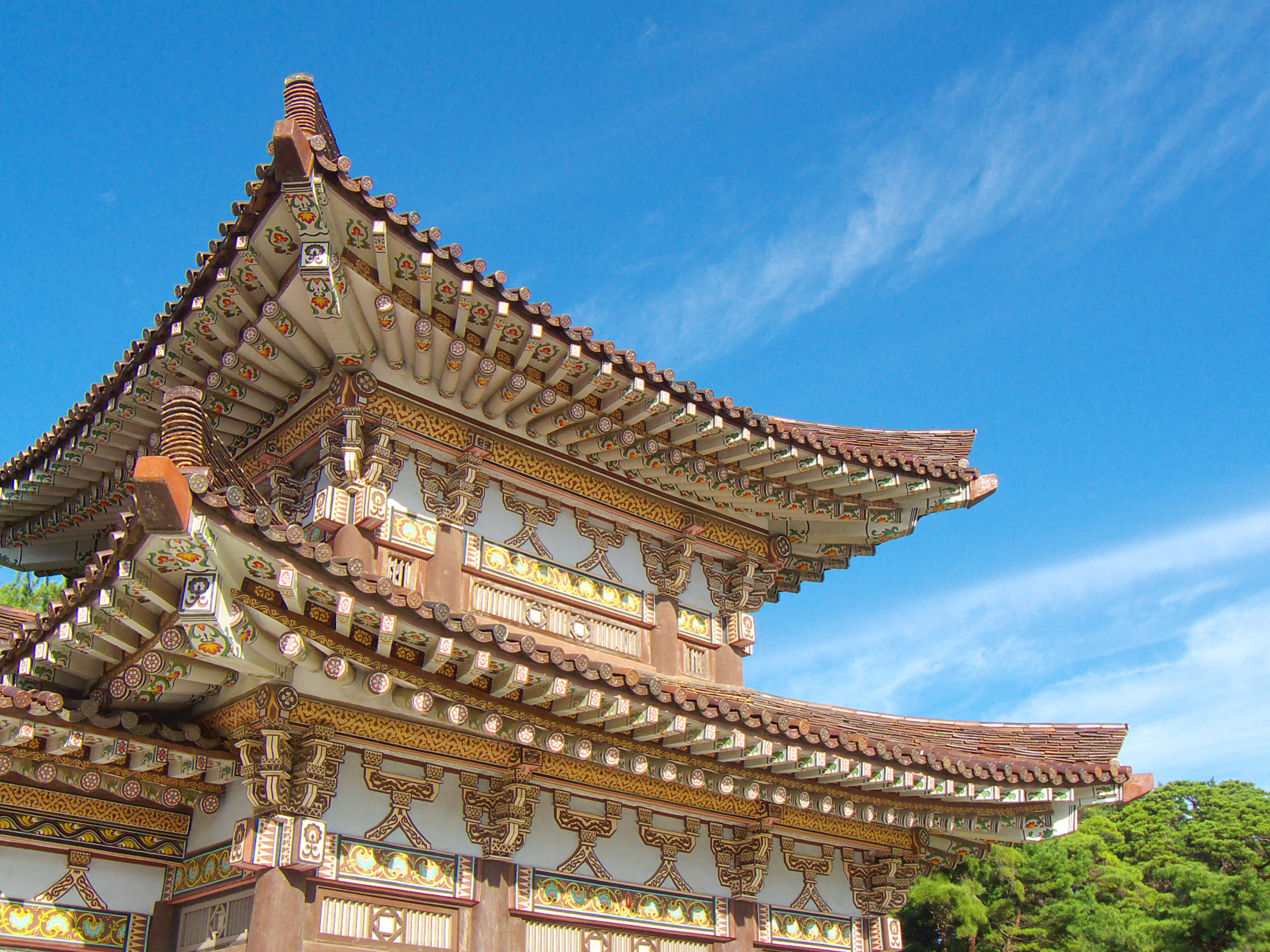

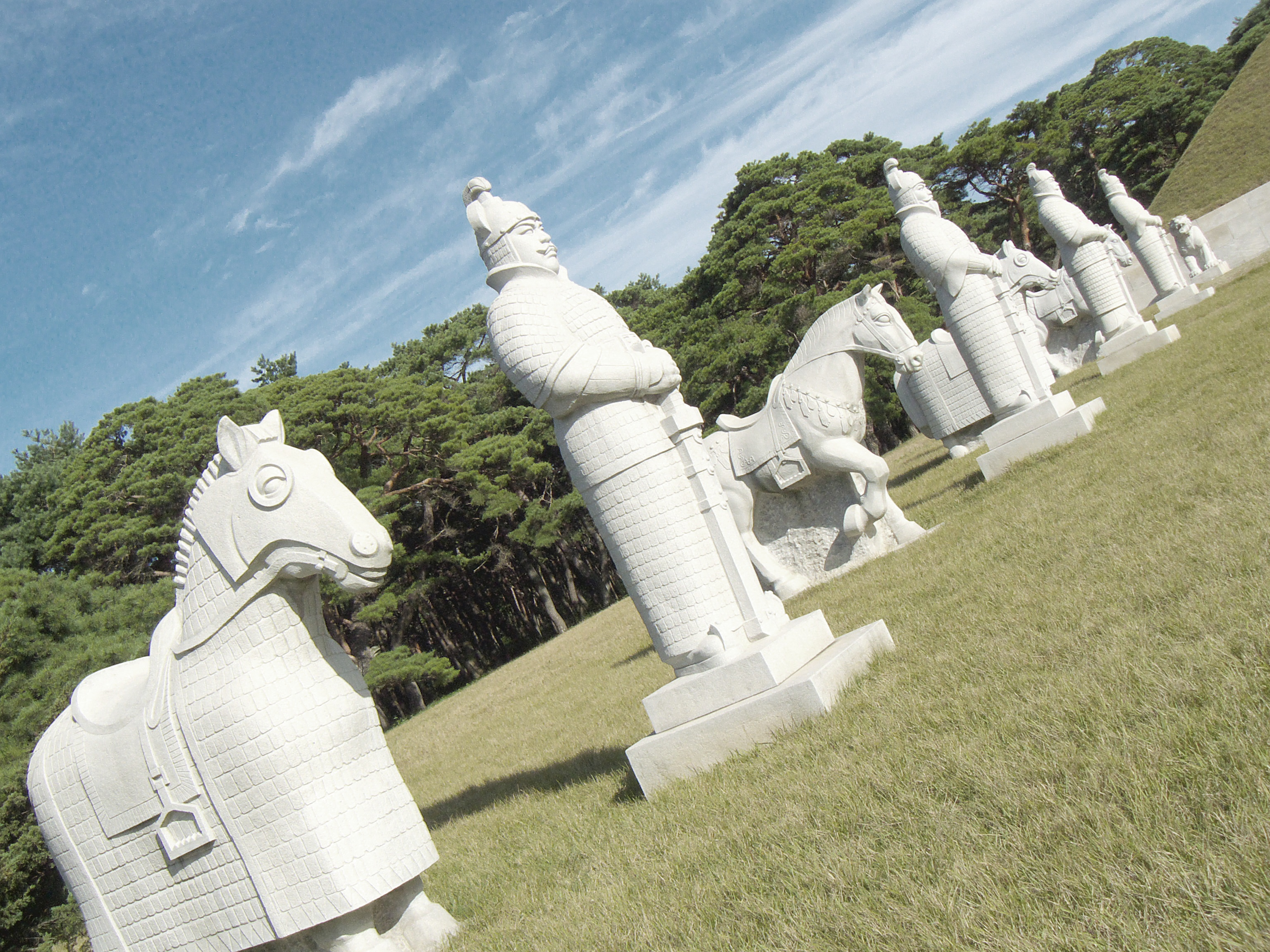

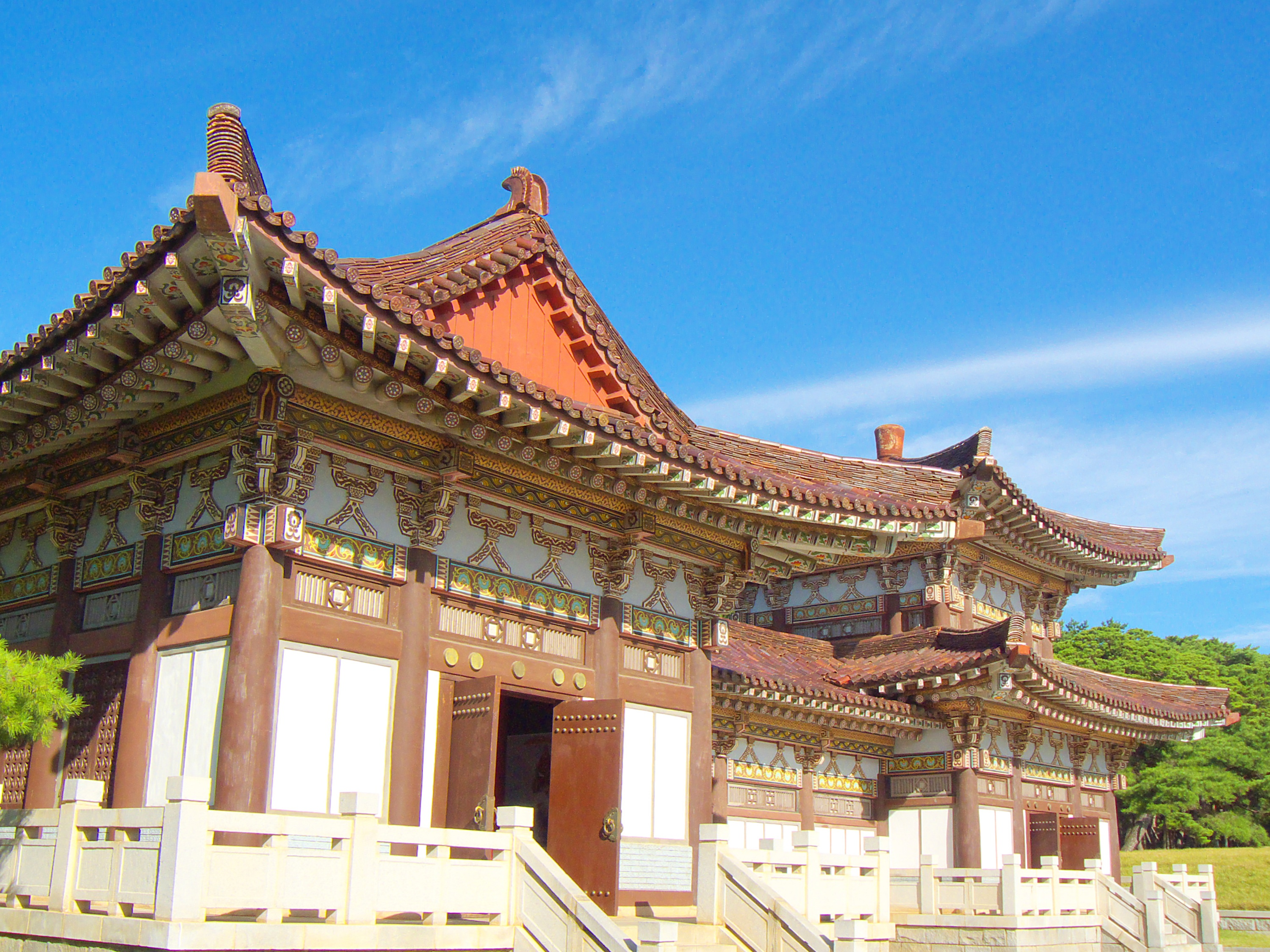

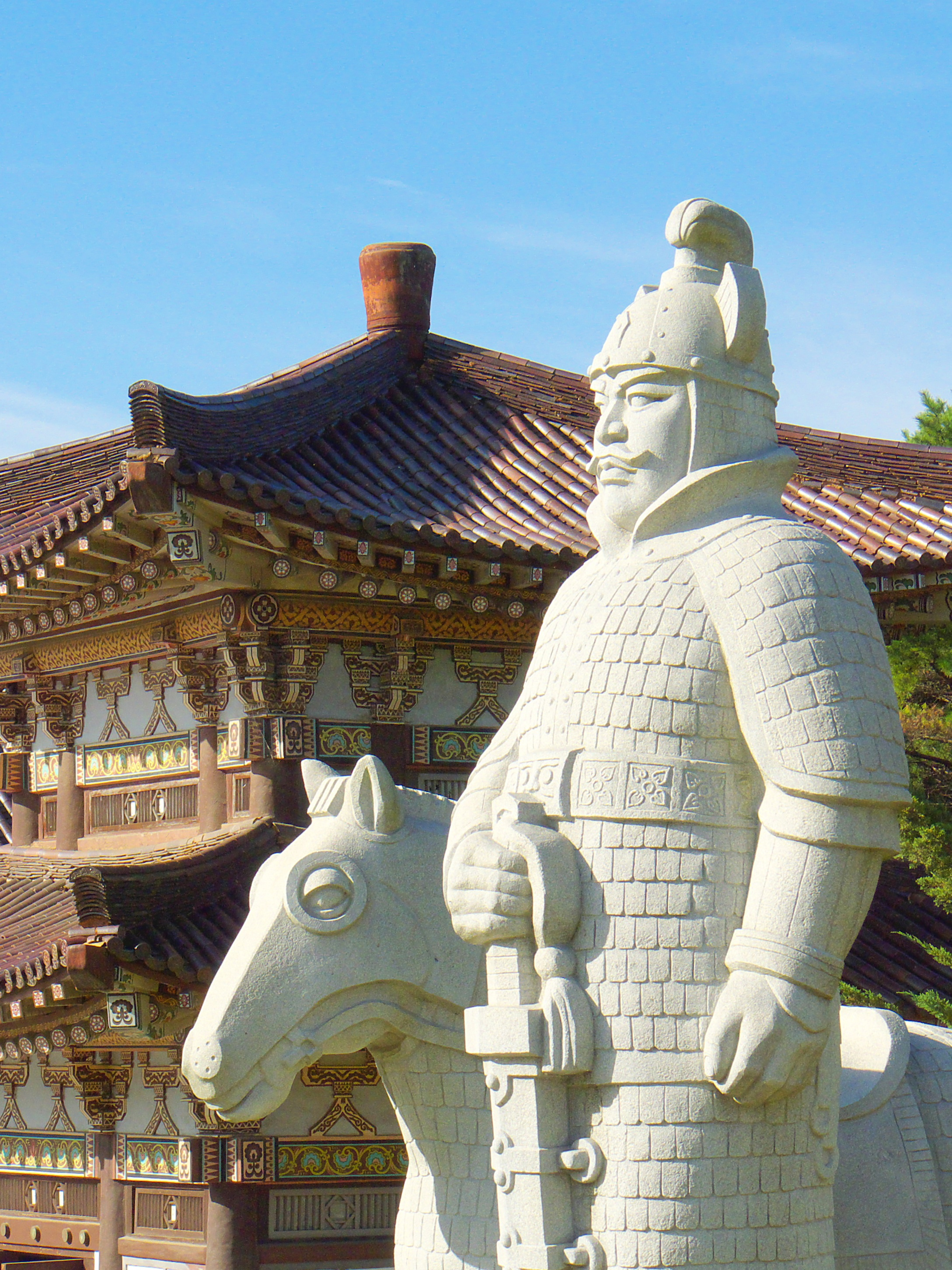
