= Yaksu-ri rock-paintings tomb =

Tomb in South Pyongan Province, North Korea

- Chosŏn'gŭl: 약수리벽화무덤
- Hancha: 藥水里壁畫무덤
- Revised Romanization: Yaksuri-byeokwamudeom
- McCune–Reischauer: Yaksuri-byŏk'wamudŏm

The Yaksu-ri rock-paintings tomb (Korean: 약수리벽화무덤) are located in Yaksu-ri, Kangso-gun, South Pyongan Province, North Korea.

The early 5th Century tomb is noted for its many paintings; one painting depicts a hunting scene and another shows an early version of an ondol heating system.

The tomb was excavated in 1958. The tomb complex starts with a corridor running from the entrance to the burial chamber. It also has a nearly rectangular antechamber with small alcoves built into the side walls of the antechamber; a passageway connects the antechamber and the burial chamber which is nearly rectangular. The burial chamber is 5 meters high, the antechamber is 4 meters in height. The ceiling of the burial chamber features an intersecting triangular ceiling, with four triangular walls leaning toward the center, two levels of intersecting triangles or mojurim, and a stone cover.
