= Jinpa-ri Tomb No. 1 =

- Hangul: 진파리일호무덤
- Hanja: 眞坡里一號무덤
- RR: Jinpa-ri ilho mudeom
- MR: Chinp'a-ri irho mudŏm

The Jinpa-ri Tomb No. 1 (also known as General Goheul's Tomb) is noted for its tomb paintings. Located in Pyongyang, the Tomb is part of the Kosai Tombs.

The structure is dated from the second half of the 6th Century. The tomb consists of a main chamber and a corridor. The mound of tomb is 30 m wide and 7 m in height. The tomb ceiling shows with lotus flowers surrounded by the sun, the moon and honeysuckles. The walls of the tomb show the Four Directional Deities, flying clouds, and a honeysuckle pattern. The corridor walls depict guardian figures. The tomb's occupant is believed to be Goheul, a General in Koguryo.

One of the paintings in the tomb displays a replica of a pine tree together with Hyunmoo (a hybrid of snake and turtle), one of the four guardian deities, being the "North" deity. The depiction of the trees in this tomb noted to be "the most sophisticated and realistic depiction of the subject found in the Koguryo tombs."

== See also ==
- Jinpa-ri Tomb No. 4
