= Korean Central History Museum =

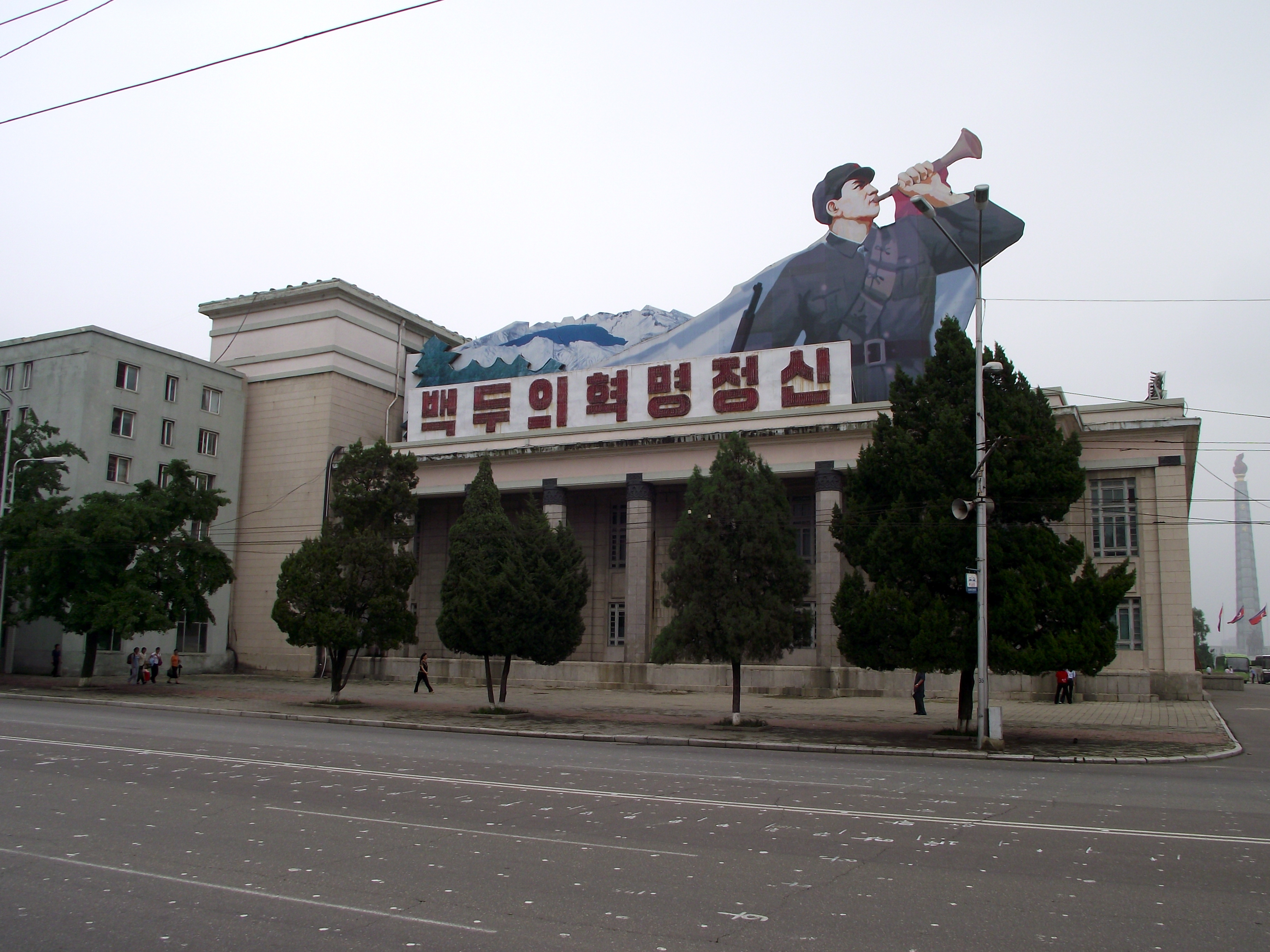
- Location: Pyongyang, North Korea
- Coordinates: 39.020701°N 125.754646°E
- Type: History museum
- Collection size: 100,000 relics
- Founder: Kim Il Sung

The Korean Central History Museum (Korean: 조선중앙력사박물관) is a museum located in Pyongyang, North Korea. The museum is located at the north end of Kim Il-sung Square. It contains displays on Korean history from primitive society to the modern age.

== History ==
The museum was established on 1 December 1945 by Kim Il Sung. It was located on Moran Hill. During the Korean War, most of the museum's collections were hidden, and the original museum building was destroyed by the US troops.

The museum was rebuilt on Kim Il-sung Square in 1960 (or 1977). In 1998, the museum was commemorated on a series of postage stamps.

In a 2014 speech, Kim Jong Un stated that he wanted to set the Korean Central History Museum as a base standard for history museums around the world. In 2015, the museum claimed 10 million visitors since its opening in 1945.

== Description ==
The museum contains 10,500 square meters of exhibition space divided into 19 rooms. The collection contains around 100,000 relics and artefacts.

The museum is opened to foreigners and tourists, and taking photos inside the museum is prohibited.

== Collection ==
- 1-million year old bones (according to the sign) excavated from Komun Moru in 1966
- Replica of the world's first rocket battery

== See also ==
- List of museums in North Korea
