= Komun Moru =

Relics in Pyongyang, North Korea

- Chosŏn'gŭl: 검은모루
- Revised Romanization: Geomeunmoru
- McCune–Reischauer: Kŏmŭnmoru

The Komun Moru ruins (Korean: 검은모루) are "primitive relics" discovered in Sangwon County, Pyongyang, North Korea. Many of the relics are on display at the Korean Central History Museum in Pyongyang.

The relics were located in a cave, and have been dated to the Upper Paleolithic Age. North Korean archaeologists propose that the Komunmoru cave site should be dated about one million years, but "the evidence for supporting this hypothesis is exiguous". A western source dates the remains at 600 000 years old.

== History ==
According to North Korea, the cave was discovered and surveyed in 1960s. The site was found to contain stone implements (stone hatchets, trapezoid tools, edged chisels and pieces of various tools) and twenty-nine fossilized animal bones (including the Sangwon horse, a buffalo and a monkey that are now extinct). The other fossils are believed to belong to the Paleozoic Age.

A Japanese report indicates that the site was excavated from 1966 to 1970. The limestone cave contained five levels from the floor upwards. The protected relics in question were found in the fourth layer of the site (from the Lower Paleolithic era). Aside from these, the first, the third and the fourth layers (from the bottom upward) have yielded "rich faunal remains corresponding to (the) early period of (the) Middle Pleistocene". The tools are described as a biface, a trapezoidal heavy tool, a heavy point, a large flake tool and a hammer stone. The stone tools are made of siliceous limestone, while the hammer stones and scrapers are made of vein quartz. Among the features of the tools, heavy flakes and cores were produced by a hurling technique, followed by a few direct percussions to form the cutting edges, with little to no secondary retouches in most cases.
