= Kuwolsan =

Mountain in North Korea

Coordinates: 38°30′N 125°16′E

- Hangul: 구월산
- Hanja: 九月山
- RR: Guwolsan
- MR: Kuwŏlsan

Kuwŏlsan, or Mount Kuwol, is a mountain in South Hwanghae Province, North Korea. The mountain takes its name from the ninth month of the lunar calendar, because it is considered particularly attractive in that month. The mountain is a major summer resort in North Korea, attracting many domestic tourists.

Kuwolsan is home to the Sansong Revolutionary Site, the 9th century Anak Woljongsa and the stupas, as well as the 4th century Anak Tomb No. 3.

== Environment ==
The highest peak of the mountain - the highest point in the short Kuwol range - is 954 m above sea level. There are several scenic routes through the mountain area. Natural attractions include rock formations, waterfalls and natural pools. Much of the mountain is covered by mixed broadleaf and coniferous forest and protected in an 18,000 ha national park. Some 1100 ha has been identified by BirdLife International as an Important Bird Area (IBA).

== See also ==
- List of mountains in Korea
