= Sangwon County =

Sangwŏn County 상원군
- County

Korean transcription(s)
  - Hanja: 祥原郡
  - McCune-Reischauer: Sangwŏn-gun
  - Revised Romanization: Sangwon-gun
- Interactive map of Sangwŏn County
- Country: North Korea
- Province: North Hwanghae Province
- Administrative divisions: 1 up, 1 rodongjagu, 20 ri

Area
  - Total: 489.9 km^{2} (189.2 sq mi)

Population (2008)
  - Total: 92,831
  - Density: 189.5/km^{2} (490.8/sq mi)

Sangwŏn County is a county of North Hwanghae, formerly one of the four suburban counties located in east P'yŏngyang, North Korea. Prior to 1952, Sangwŏn was merely a township of Chunghwa County. In 1952 it was separated as a separate county, and in 1963 it was added as a county of Pyongyang. It is north of North Hwanghae's Hwangju, Yŏntan, and Suan counties, south of the Nam River and Kangdong county west of Yŏnsan county, and east of Chunghwa County. In 2010, it was administratively reassigned from P'yŏngyang to North Hwanghae; foreign media attributed the change as an attempt to relieve shortages in P'yŏngyang's food distribution system.

== Transportation ==
Sangwon county has a trolleybus system with a single track of bidirectional overhead wire and a length of just over 4 kilometers, running from Myongdang-rodongjagu to Sangwon Cement Complex, ending a few kilometers to the east in another residential zone. The depot is located on the eastern terminus and features a covered building. Apart from a period in 2017, the line appears to be in constant operation.

== Administrative divisions ==
The county is divided into one town (ŭp), one worker's district (rodongjagu) and 20 'ri' (villages).

- Sangwŏn-ŭp
  상원읍/祥原邑
- Myŏngdang-rodongjagu
  명당노동자구/明堂勞動者區
- Chang-ri
  장리/場里
- Changhang-ri
  장항리/ 獐項里
- Chŏnsal-li
  전산리/錢山里
- Chung-ri
  중리/中里
- Hŭgu-ri
  흑우리/黑隅里
- Kŭmsŏng-ri
  금성리/金城里
- Kwiil-li
  귀일리/貴逸里
- Pŏndong-ri
  번동리/繁洞里
- Rodong-ri
  로동리/蘆洞里
- Rŭngsŏng-ri
  릉성리/綾盛里
- Ryŏngch'ŏl-li
  령천리/靈川里
- Ryonggong-ri
  룡곡리/龍谷里
- Sagi-ri
  사기리/沙器里
- Siksong-ri
  식송리/植松里
- Sinwŏl-li
  신원리/新院里
- Susal-li
  수산리/水山里
- Taech'ŏl-li
  대천리/大泉里
- Taedong-ri
  대동리/大同里
- Taehŭng-ri
  대흥리/大興里
- Ŭn'gu-ri
  은구리/銀口里
