= Founding myth of Baekje =

Korean myth

Creation myth of Baekje is the creation story of Baekje dynasty about Onjo, the first king of the Baejke Dynasty, and Biryu, his elder brother. They were the princes of the Buyeo dynasty, but were not a crown prince. Thus they left Buyeo to establish their own country. Finally, Onjo founded Baekje dynasty.

== History ==
It is said that the Baekje dynasty was founded in the B.C. 18, the place of its founding varies from Daebanghyeon to Hanam Wiryeseong. The founder of Baekje is Onjo or Biryu. The first record of the founder of Baekje is Samguk Sagi (History of the Three Kingdoms) by Kim Pusik. The 'Baekje Bongi' of the "Samguk Sagi", The "Samguk Yusa" and The "Haedong Goseungjeon" (해동고승전; 海東高僧傳) mention the founder of Baekje as Onjo or Biryu. The 'Jiriji' (Geography) of the "Samguk Sagi", history books in China, or The Shoku Nihongi mention Dongmyeong (동명; 東明), Wutae (우태; 優太), Gutae (구태; 仇太), and Domo (도모; 都慕).

According to the inaugural year of King Onjo's accession in The 'Baekje Bongi' 1 of the "Samguk Sagi" Volume 23, Onjo's father was Chumo (추모; 鄒牟) or Jumong (주몽; 朱蒙), who came from Bukbuyeo to Jolbonbuyeo and married the second daughter of King of Buyeo. After the death of the king of Buyeo, Jumong succeeded to the throne. At this time, he gave birth to two sons, the first being Biryu and the second Onjo. However, when the son Jumong gave birth to when he was in Bukbuyeo came and became the crown prince, Onjo and Biryu left south with ten servants including Ogan (오간; 烏干) and Maryeo (마려; 馬黎) to Hansan (한산; 漢山). They set up the capital at Hanam Wiyreseong (하남위례성; 河南慰禮城). and named the country Sipje (십제; 十濟). This was the third year of Hongjia (홍가, zh:鸿嘉), Emperor of Cheng of the Former Han Dynasty, which is B.C. 18.

Biryu did not follow the advice of the Ten Gods (십신) and went to live in Michuhol, but since the land in Michuhol was damp and the water was salty, he returned to Wiryeseong and died. After that, Onjo named the country Baekje because the people followed him happily every day. The lineage came from Buyeo like Goguryeo, so the surname was taken as Buyeo. According to the recorded Biryu story, King Biryu, the founder of Baekje, had his father Utaero Bukbuyeo, a child of a concubine of Haeburu (해부루; 解扶婁), and his mother Soseono, the daughter of Yeontabal (연타발; 延陁勃), a Jolbon person.

Soseono first married Wutae and gave birth to Biryu and Onjo. After Wutae's death, Soseono assisted Jumong from Bubuyeo in establishing Goguryeo in Jolbon. Accordingly, Jumong made Soseono his wife and treated him with special hospitality, and treated Biryu and Onjo as if they were her own sons. Upon the arrival of his son Yuryu (유류; 孺留), born in Buyeo, Jumong made him the crown prince to succeed to the throne. In response, Biryu, along with his younger brother Onjo, took his mother and crossed Paesu and Daesu to live in Michuhol. On the other hand, according to Buksa and Suseo, Gongsun Du, the governor of Liaodong of the Han Dynasty, made Gutae, a descendant of Dongmyeong, who had a strong sense of dignity and trust, take his daughter as his wife. It is said that Biryu-guk became a powerful country in Dong-i.

== Analysis ==
Baekje's founding myth is presumed to have changed whenever the capital was moved. Here, Onjo and Biryu are not the main characters of the founding myth, but only as the founders of the country. And in the Hanseong Baekje era, when the Onjo faction seized power, it borrowed 'The Myth of King Dongmyeong' of Buyeo, which is somewhat different from the myth of Jumong of Goguryeo. When the capital was moved to Ungjin, it seems that the Biryu line took over the government and borrowed the descendant line's founding myths such as 'The Legend of Gomnaru' and the Biryu story in the Gongju region.

The meaning of the word 'Biryu' is unknown, but Goguryeo Songyangguk (松讓國) is also called Biryuguk, and the name of the river is also called Biryusu. Gakhun(覺訓)'s "Haedong Goseungjeon" describes Biryu as 'Piryu' (피류; 避流) and Onjo as 'Eunjo' (은조; 殷祚).

== See also ==
- Baekje
- Onjo
- Biryu
- Buyeo
- Soseono
