= Wutae =

Figure in the founding legends of the Korean kingdom of Baekje

- Hangul: 우태
- Hanja: 優台
- RR: Utae
- MR: Ut'ae

Wutae (Korean: 우태; Hanja: 優台; ? – ?) is a figure in the founding legends of the kingdom of Baekje, one of the Three Kingdoms of Korea. He was an illegitimate son or grandchild of the King of Dongbuyeo, Hae Buru (解夫婁).

== Background ==
Wutae married So Seo-no, the daughter of the Jolbon chieftain, Yeon Ta-bal (延陀勃). She gave birth to the sons Biryu and Onjo who became the founders of Baekje. After Wutae died So Seo-no married Wutae's relative, Jumong (朱蒙) who founded the kingdom of Goguryeo and is posthumously known as Dongmyeong.

== Theories ==
Kim Pusik, the author of the Samguk Sagi (三國史記) presents two founding legends and states "it is unknown which of these accounts is true". The two stories have overlapping stories but the father of Biryu and Onjo differ. A third legend from Chinese records states that a certain "Gutae" was the founder of Baekje.

According to the most accepted Onjo Founder Legend (시조 온조설):

- Jumong escaped peril in Bukbuyeo because of jealousy of Daeso and arrived in Jolbon. The chieftain of Jolbon, Yeon Ta-bal, was without a male heir and had three daughters. Upon seeing Jumong, he knew that he was not an ordinary man so he made his second daughter So Seo-no his wife. Shortly thereafter Yeon Ta-bal died. Jumong succeeded him to the throne and had two sons. The first was named Biryu and the second was named Onjo (it is also said that Jumong went to Jolbon and married a woman from Wolgun, and that he had two sons by her). Before Jumong had come to Jolbon when he was in Bukbuyeo he had a son named Yuri with Lady Ye who fled Bukbuyeo with her son and came to Goguryeo. At this time So Seo-no was queen but after Jumong made his eldest son Yuri the crown prince she gave up her title and left Goguryeo with her two sons. They left with Ogan, Mayeo and then other ministers to the south with a large number of commoners following them. When they reached Mt. Hansan they climbed to the summit and looked upon the land. Biryu wanted to settle on the beach, and the ten ministers told him it was not a good location, however Biryu did not listen and settled in Michuhol. Onjo made his capital south of the river in Wiryeseong, and the ten ministers assisted him. He called the country "Sipje". Biryu soon had problems in Michuhol, where the earth was wet and the rivers salty, and could not dwell in security so he came to look upon Wiryeseong, where the capital and its villages were stable as a three-legged cauldron, and the people dwelt in security. Then he was ashamed and died. His ministers and people all came to Wiryeseong and the name of the kingdom was changed to Baekje. Since its lineage and that of Goguryeo are both from Buyeo they chose the surname "Buyeo".

According to the Biryu Founder Legend:

- The first ancestor was Biryu, and that his father was Wutae, an illegitimate grandson of the king of Bukbuyeo, Hae Buru. His mother was So Seo-no, a daughter of Yeon Ta-bal, a man of Jolbon. She was married to Wutae and gave birth to two sons. The oldest was called Biryu, and the younger called Onjo. Wutae died and she was widowed, and settled in Jolbon. After some time Jumong was not well-treated in Buyeo so in spring of the second month, he fled south to Jolbon and established the capital of Goguryeo. He married So Seo-no and she became his consort, and because she, in the creation of his realm, rendered great assistance, Jumong especially favored them and received Biryu and Onjo as if they were his own sons. When Jumong was in Buyeo he had a son named Yuri by a woman of the Ye clan, and when he came he was made crown prince and the one who would succeed him. Therefore Biryu asked his younger brother Onjo, saying “Originally the great king fled the difficulties in Buyeo and escaped here. Our mother's clan poured out the riches of their house to aid in the endeavor of creating the kingdom, and her toils were many. Now the great king has left this world, and the state has fallen to Yuri, and if we were to follow along here it would be as depressing as a tumor. Would it not be respectful to our mother's clan if we went to the south and divined the land, and established a separate capital?” Then he and his brother many factions, and crossed the Pae and Dae rivers, and arrived in Michuhol and settled there.

According to the Gutae Founder Theory (시조 구태설):

- The Pei Shih and Book of Sui both tell that "one descendant of Dongmyeong was Gutae (仇台) who was sincere in his benevolence. When he first established his country in the territory of the former Daifang commandery, the prefect of the Han territory of Liaodong, Gongsun Du, had his daughter marry Gutae. Afterwards his country became a powerful state among the Eastern Barbarians."

Most scholars believe that "Gutae" (仇台) refers to Wutae (優台) because of the similarity of the names but another theory is that Gutae refers to Goi of Baekje who is traditionally the eighth king of Baekje.

In contradiction of these some scholars think that Biryu was a son of Wutae but Onjo was the son of Jumong.

== Family ==
- Father: Hae Buru
- Mother: unknown
  - Brother: Geumwa of Dongbuyeo (金蛙王, 48–7BCE)
  - Wife: So Seo-no (召西奴, 77–6BCE)
    - 1st son: Biryu (沸流, ?–?)
    - 2nd son: Onjo of Baekje (溫祚王, ?–28AD)

== See also ==
- Jumong
- Baekje
- Jolbon
- Buyeo
- So Seo-no
- Onjo of Baekje
- Biryu
- Dongmyeong of Goguryeo
- Yuri of Goguryeo
- Buyeo
