= Jumong (TV series) =

2006–2007 South Korean television series

- Promotional poster
- Also known as: Prince of Legend; The Book of the Three Hans
- Hangul: 삼한지: 주몽편
- Hanja: 三韓志: 朱蒙篇
- Lit.: The Book of the Three Hans: The Chapter of Jumong
- RR: Samhanji: jumongpyeon
- MR: Samhanji: chumongp'yŏn
- Genre: Epic; Historical; Romance; Action
- Written by: Choi Wan-kyu; Jung Hyung-soo
- Directed by: Lee Joo-hwan
- Starring: Song Il-kook; Han Hye-jin; Kim Seung-soo; Jun Kwang-ryul; Oh Yeon-soo
- Theme music composer: Oh Joon-sung
- Country of origin: South Korea
- Original language: Korean
- No. of episodes: 81 (Note: The series was originally planned to have 60 episodes; but due to its popularity 21 additional episodes were produced.)

Production
- Executive producer: Kim Tae-hoon
- Producer: Kim Tae-hoon
- Running time: 65 minutes
- Production companies: Chorokbaem Media; Olive9

Original release
- Network: MBC TV
- Release: 15 May 2006 – 6 March 2007

Jumong (Korean: 삼한지: 주몽 편) is a South Korean epic series that aired on MBC from 2006 to 2007 as the network's 45th anniversary special. Originally scheduled for 60 episodes, MBC extended it to 81 because of its popularity.

The series examines the life of King Dongmyeong, founder of the kingdom of Goguryeo.

== Plot ==
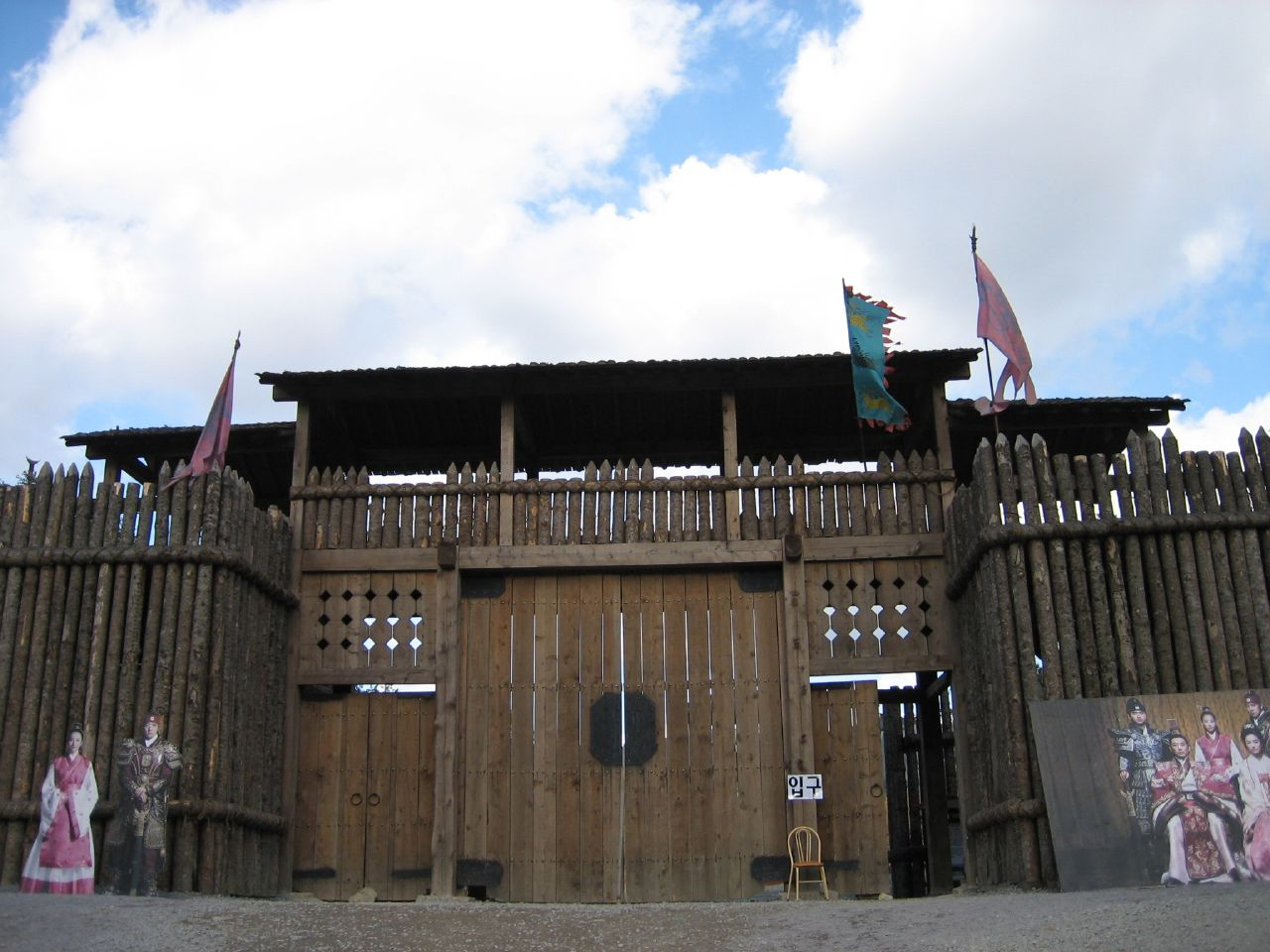
Jumong film set at Yongin Daejanggeum Park

Following the conquest of Gojoseon by Han China in 108 BCE, the surviving tribes and city-states of Manchuria and the northern Korean Peninsula are harshly subjugated as tributaries to the Han, who are portrayed as ruling with an iron fist from the Four Commanderies. Haemosu, the leader of the local resistance in the form of the Damul Army, covertly teams up with Prince Geumwa of Buyeo to defend and rescue Gojoseon refugees throughout the land. After being injured in a battle, Haemosu is rescued by Lady Yuhwa of the Habaek tribe (to whom Geumwa has taken a fancy), and they fall in love. Haemosu is subsequently ambushed and captured by Han forces (and after falling off a cliff is presumed dead by the outside world), and Lady Yuhwa is forced to seek shelter in Buyeo, where she becomes Geumwa's concubine and gives birth to a son, Jumong. They maintain that Geumwa is Jumong's father, when in fact Haemosu is his father.

Twenty years later, the young Jumong is a weak and cowardly prince overshadowed and scorned by his elder "half-brothers" Daeso and Youngpo, who are vying for inheritance of the Buyeo throne from their father (the now-King Geumwa). Because they believe Jumong is Geumwa's son, they assume that he has a justifiable claim to the throne, and their mother's hatred of Lady Yuhwa reinforces a feud between the half-brothers who aren't really brothers at all. This culminates in an assassination attempt by his brothers, setting in motion a sequence of events that leads to Jumong leaving the palace and, by a twist of fate, encounters his father, the now-elderly and blind Haemosu. Jumong becomes skilled in combat under Haemosu's covert tutelage, but is unaware of their father-son relationship. At the same time, Jumong forms a close relationship with Lady Soseono of the Gyeru trading clan of Jolbon. Following Haemosu's assassination by Daeso and Youngpo, Jumong learns the truth and vows to avenge his father and drive out the Han. He returns to Geumwa and leads the Buyeo army in a campaign against the Lintun and Zhenfan Commanderies, but is reported missing in action and presumed dead following an injury in battle. Subsequently, Daeso seizes power in Buyeo by colluding with Xuantu Commandery and forces Soseono to be his wife. In desperation, Soseono weds her trading partner Wootae (not knowing Jumong is still alive). Jumong, however, is rescued by the Hanbaek tribe and nursed back to health by Lady Ye So-ya, whom he weds. They return to Buyeo and Jumong feigns servitude to Daeso, thereby earning his trust. With Daeso's guard down, Jumong and his men manage to intercept and lead a large group of Gojoseon refugees into the wilds of Mount Bongye, where they establish a fortress and re-form the Damul Army, against Daeso's wishes, who holds Lady Yuhwa and a pregnant Yesoya hostage in the palace. After a solar eclipse, Geumwa regains the power with the help of the Prime Minister. He tries to convince Jumong to come back to palace and disband the Damul Army as part of the conditions given by the Prime minister in exchange for his reinstatement. Jumong refuses the offer and the Prime Minister tries to eliminate him and his men.

Over the next three years, the Damul Army grows and begins uniting various local tribes, to the discomfort of Buyeo and Han. Following Wootae's death in battle, Jumong and Soseono form an alliance and unite the five clans of Jolbon and the Damul Army into a single powerful entity, which succeeds in conquering the Xuantu Commandery and establishing the Kingdom of Goguryeo. When Yesoya and Yuri are reported missing from Buyeo (and presumed dead), a grieving Jumong weds Soseono and they become King and Queen of the new nation.

After ruling Goguryeo for fifteen years, Jumong succeeds in reuniting with Yesoya and Yuri (who had been living in exile after escaping from the palace). Following Geumwa's assassination by Han mercenaries, the newly-crowned King Daeso forms an alliance with Jumong, and the combined armies of Goguryeo and Buyeo succeed in conquering Liaodong Commandery with utter annihilation of the Han army in Manchuria. With Jumong's lifelong mission finally complete and in order to prevent internal strife due to Yuri's return, Soseono departs from Goguryeo and heads south with the pro-Jolbon faction and her teenage sons Biryu and Onjo, who subsequently becomes the founder of the Kingdom of Baekje on the Korean Peninsula. Buyeo eventually collapses following the battlefield death of Daeso at the hands of Jumong's grandson Muhyul. Jumong continues battling against Han China to consolidate his realm, and dies at the age of 40 after passing the crown of Goguryeo to Yuri.

== Cast ==
- Song Il-kook as Jumong
- Han Hye-jin as Soseono
- Kim Seung-soo as Prince Daeso
- Jun Kwang-ryul as King Geumwa
- Oh Yeon-soo as Lady Yuhwa
- Kyeon Mi-ri as Queen Wonhu
- Song Ji-hyo as Ye So-ya
- Park Tam-hee as Yang Seo-ran
- Ahn Yong-joon as Yuri
  - Jung Yoon-seok as young Yuri
- Kim Byung-ki as Yeon Ta-bal
- Jin Hee-kyung as High Priestess Yeo Mi-eul
- Lee Jae-yong as Prime Minister Bu Deuk-bul
- Huh Joon-ho as Hae Mosu
- Won Ki-joon as Prince Youngpo
- Bae Soo-bin as Sa-yong
- Kang Eun-tak as Chan-soo
- Im So-yeong as Bu-young
- Yoon Dong-hwan as Yang-jung
- Oh Uk-chul as Lord Hwang
- Yeo Ho-min as General Oi
- Ahn Jeong-hoon as Ma-ri
- Im Dae-ho as Hyeop-bo
- Lee Kye-in as Mo Pal-mo
- Seo Beom-sik as Moo-gol
- Kim Min-chan as Mook-geo
- Cha Kwang-soo as Jae-sa
- Park Kyung-hwan as Bu Beon-no
- Park Nam-hyeon as Na-ru
- Jeong Ho-bin as Wutae
- Lee Jae-suk as Biryu
- Kim Seok as Onjo
- Lee Won-jae as Do-chi
- Kwon Yong-woon as Moo-song
- Oh Ji-young as Jong-go
- Jo Myung-jin as Mu-duk
- Lee Seung-ah as Chun-rang
- Han Hee-jin as In-rang
- Kim Nan-hee as Ji-rang
- Min Ji-young as courtesan
- Kim Ho-young as Ma-ga
- Kim Won-suk as Song-joo
- Son Ho-kyoon as Heuk-chi
- No Hee-ji as So-ryeong
- Jeong Han-heon as Kye-pil
- Jang Hyo-jin as Baek Sun-in
- Hwang Bum-sik as Jin-yong
- Park Jong-kwan as Song-yang
- Bae Do-hwan as Tae Ma-jin
- Baek Na-young as Yeon Chae-ryeong
- Kim Jin-ho as Yang-tak
- Ha Yong-jin as Dong-sun
- Yoon Seo-hyun as Han-dang
- Lee Hwan as Sang-chun
- Han Kyung-sun as court lady
- Yoo Hee-jung as court lady
- Song Gui-hun as Bul-gae
- Kwon Eun-ha as Mauryeong
- Kang Moon-hee as Hyun-moo
- Dan So-young as Yoo-sung
- Jeon Ha-eun as Byeo Ri-ha
- Lee Sung as Hae Byeol-chan
- Hong Soon-chang as Jin Joong-moon
- Lee Chang-hwan as head of a tribe
- Park Geun-hyung as King Hae Buru
- Shin Joon-young as Bae-mang
- Han In-su as head of a tribe
- Kim Yong-hee as Sul-tak
- Oh Seung-yun as Chun-doong
- Son Sun-geun as Man-ho
- Lee Won-yong as fortune-teller
- Moon Hee-won as former Governor-general
- Yun Yong-hyeon as Boo Wiyeom
- Jang Hee-woong as Ha Hoo-chun
- Samuel Kang as warrior

== Production ==
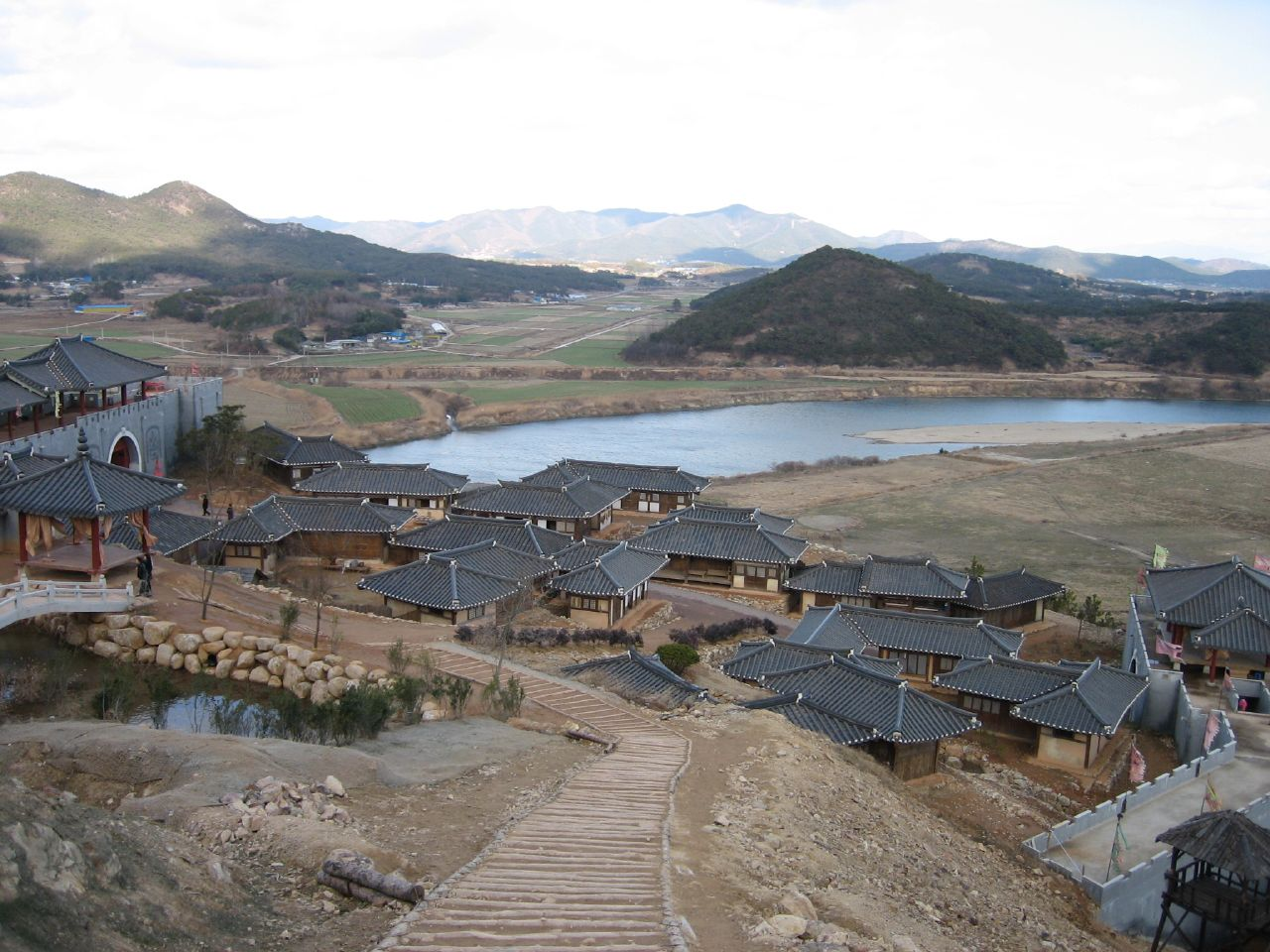
Jumong film set

Jumong was filmed on location at Yongin Daejanggeum Park in Cheoin District, Yongin, Gyeonggi Province, where other period dramas (such as Dong Yi, Moon Embracing the Sun and Queen Seondeok) were also filmed.

== Ratings ==
Jumong received the highest viewership ratings of all the Korean dramas that aired in 2006.

Date	Episode	Nationwide	Seoul
2006-05-15	1	16.3% (3rd)	17.5% (3rd)
2006-05-16	2	18.4% (3rd)	19.2% (3rd)
2006-05-22	3	21.8% (1st)	23.6% (1st)
2006-05-23	4	25.3% (2nd)	26.6% (2nd)
2006-05-29	5	28.0% (1st)	29.9% (1st)
2006-05-30	6	28.7% (1st)	29.6% (1st)
2006-06-05	7	27.9% (1st)	29.2% (1st)
2006-06-06	8	32.3% (1st)	33.7% (1st)
2006-06-20	9	29.4% (1st)	30.7% (1st)
2006-06-26	10	33.2% (1st)	35.3% (1st)
2006-06-27	11	32.9% (1st)	34.8% (1st)
2006-07-03	12	36.4% (1st)	38.1% (1st)
2006-07-04	13	37.6% (1st)	38.8% (1st)
2006-07-10	14	35.8% (1st)	37.5% (1st)
2006-07-11	15	37.2% (1st)	38.8% (1st)
2006-07-17	16	40.1% (1st)	42.8% (1st)
2006-07-18	17	38.7% (1st)	39.9% (1st)
2006-07-24	18	39.6% (1st)	41.1% (1st)
2006-07-25	19	39.9% (1st)	40.5% (1st)
2006-07-31	20	35.1% (1st)	36.1% (1st)
2006-08-01	21	36.8% (1st)	38.2% (1st)
2006-08-07	22	37.3% (1st)	37.9% (1st)
2006-08-08	23	37.4% (1st)	38.9% (1st)
2006-08-14	24	35.5% (1st)	35.8% (1st)
2006-08-15	25	39.3% (1st)	40.7% (1st)
2006-08-21	26	38.1% (1st)	39.6% (1st)
2006-08-22	27	39.5% (1st)	40.0% (1st)
2006-08-28	28	40.3% (1st)	41.7% (1st)
2006-08-29	29	40.3% (1st)	40.9% (1st)
2006-09-04	30	39.7% (1st)	40.6% (1st)
2006-09-05	31	40.3% (1st)	41.4% (1st)
2006-09-11	32	39.3% (1st)	40.6% (1st)
2006-09-12	33	38.5% (1st)	39.2% (1st)
2006-09-18	34	39.5% (1st)	40.3% (1st)
2006-09-19	35	43.0% (1st)	43.9% (1st)
2006-09-25	36	42.8% (1st)	43.9% (1st)
2006-09-26	37	43.6% (1st)	44.4% (1st)
2006-10-02	38	42.6% (1st)	43.2% (1st)
2006-10-03	39	44.9% (1st)	44.8% (1st)
2006-10-09	40	44.2% (1st)	45.0% (1st)
2006-10-10	41	43.6% (1st)	43.8% (1st)
2006-10-16	42	43.1% (1st)	43.6% (1st)
2006-10-17	43	42.4% (1st)	42.2% (1st)
2006-10-23	44	44.5% (1st)	45.4% (1st)
2006-10-24	45	45.0% (1st)	45.2% (1st)
2006-10-30	46	44.6% (1st)	45.1% (1st)
2006-10-31	47	43.8% (1st)	43.7% (1st)
2006-11-06	48	46.6% (1st)	47.9% (1st)
2006-11-07	49	47.2% (1st)	48.3% (1st)
2006-11-13	50	43.6% (1st)	43.5% (1st)
2006-11-14	51	48.1% (1st)	49.2% (1st)
2006-11-20	52	44.8% (1st)	45.4% (1st)
2006-11-21	53	44.0% (1st)	44.5% (1st)
2006-11-27	54	45.1% (1st)	45.2% (1st)
2006-11-28	55	44.4% (1st)	44.9% (1st)
2006-12-04	56	44.0% (1st)	44.4% (1st)
2006-12-05	57	42.9% (1st)	43.2% (1st)
2006-12-11	58	46.4% (1st)	46.1% (1st)
2006-12-12	59	41.5% (1st)	42.6% (1st)
2006-12-18	60	44.4% (1st)	45.3% (1st)
2006-12-19	61	46.6% (1st)	47.1% (1st)
2007-01-01	62	44.8% (1st)	45.8% (1st)
2007-01-02	63	45.2% (1st)	45.3% (1st)
2007-01-08	64	45.5% (1st)	45.4% (1st)
2007-01-09	65	46.8% (1st)	47.1% (1st)
2007-01-15	66	46.8% (1st)	47.5% (1st)
2007-01-16	67	47.1% (1st)	47.9% (1st)
2007-01-22	68	49.8% (1st)	50.5% (1st)
2007-01-23	69	42.0% (1st)	43.6% (1st)
2007-01-29	70	47.9% (1st)	48.3% (1st)
2007-01-30	71	50.3% (1st)	51.0% (1st)
2007-02-05	72	47.1% (1st)	48.5% (1st)
2007-02-06	73	46.0% (1st)	47.2% (1st)
2007-02-12	74	47.6% (1st)	48.1% (1st)
2007-02-13	75	47.1% (1st)	47.8% (1st)
2007-02-19	76	41.9% (1st)	42.1% (1st)
2007-02-20	77	49.7% (1st)	49.9% (1st)
2007-02-26	78	47.2% (1st)	47.1% (1st)
2007-02-27	79	50.6% (1st)	50.9% (1st)
2007-03-05	80	49.8% (1st)	50.0% (1st)
2007-03-06	81	51.9% (1st)	52.7% (1st)
Average		40.98%	41.83%

== Awards and nominations ==
Award	Category	Recipients	Result	Ref
MBC Drama Awards	Grand Prize (Daesang)	Song Il-gook	Won	
MBC Drama Awards	Drama of the Year	Jumong	Nominated	
MBC Drama Awards	Director of the Year	Lee Joo-hwan	Won	
MBC Drama Awards	Writer(s) of the Year	Choi Wan-kyu and Jung Hyung-soo	Won	
MBC Drama Awards	Top Excellence Award, Actor	Jun Kwang-ryul	Won	
MBC Drama Awards	Top Excellence Award, Actor	Song Il-gook	Won	
MBC Drama Awards	Top Excellence Award, Actress	Han Hye-jin	Won	
MBC Drama Awards	Top Excellence Award, Actress	Oh Yeon-soo	Nominated	
MBC Drama Awards	Excellence Award, Actor	Kim Seung-soo	Won	
MBC Drama Awards	Special Award, Actor in a Historical Drama	Huh Joon-ho	Won	
MBC Drama Awards	Special Award, Actress in a Historical Drama	Oh Yeon-soo	Won	
MBC Drama Awards	Special Award, Veteran Actor	Lee Kye-in	Won	
MBC Drama Awards	Best New Actor	Won Ki-joon	Won	
Baeksang Arts Awards	Grand Prize (Daesang)	Jumong	Won	
Baeksang Arts Awards	Best Drama	Jumong	Nominated	
Baeksang Arts Awards	Best Director	Lee Joo-hwan	Nominated	
Baeksang Arts Awards	Best Actor	Song Il-gook	Nominated	
Baeksang Arts Awards	Best Actress	Han Hye-jin	Nominated	
Baeksang Arts Awards	Best Screenplay	Choi Wan-kyu and Jung Hyung-soo	Won	
Baeksang Arts Awards	Best New Actress	Song Ji-hyo	Nominated	
Korea Drama Awards	Best Drama	Jumong	Won	
Seoul International Drama Awards	Best Actor	Song Il-gook	Nominated	

== International broadcast ==
Broadcast rights for Jumong were sold to Iran (Channel 3), Turkey, Moldova (TV8), Romania (TVR1), Kazakhstan, Georgia (Imedi TV), Armenia, Japan (Fuji TV), Mongolia, Taiwan, Hong Kong, Vietnam (VTV1), Singapore (Mediacorp Channel U), Indonesia, Thailand (Channel 3), Malaysia, Brunei, Philippines (GMA Network, Q, GTV, Heart of Asia), Fiji (Fiji One), Iraqi Kurdistan, Afghanistan, Uzbekistan, Tajikistan (TV SMT), Cambodia (Cambodian Television Network), United States (AZN Television), Myanmar (Myawaddy TV & MRTV-4), and Sri Lanka (Sri Lanka Rupavahini Corporation).

According to Reuters, the most popular episodes of Jumong attracted a viewership rating of over 90% in Iran (compared to 40% in South Korea), propelling its lead actor Song Il-gook to superstar status there.

=== Hong Kong broadcast controversy ===
Asia Television bought the Hong Kong broadcast rights; however, controversy surrounding its translation escalated debate about ATV's editorial independence in news and drama. The controversy primarily surrounded the removal of certain scenes, the alternative translation of place names and the alternative of a character's occupation. The replacement of the word "nation" (in reference to Goguryeo) with "tribe" and the translation of the Han Dynasty as the "heavenly dynasty" generated controversy about the station's editorial independence. The translation controversy is said to relate to the Goguryeo controversies surrounding the way the history of Goguryeo is interpreted in China and Korea (North and South).
