= Biryu (disambiguation) =

Biryu may refer to:

- Biryu, second son of Jumong the founding monarch of Goguryeo
- Biryu of Baekje (r. 304–344), eleventh king of Baekje
- Biyu of Baekje (r. 427–455), twentieth king of Baekje
