= Taru of Paekche =

2nd King of Paekche (r. 28–77)

- Hangul: 부여다루
- Hanja: 扶餘多婁
- RR: Buyeo Daru
- MR: Puyŏ Taru

Monarch name
- Hangul: 다루왕
- Hanja: 多婁王
- RR: Daruwang
- MR: Taruwang

Taru (?–77, r. 28–77) was the second king of Paekche, one of the Three Kingdoms of Korea.

== Background ==
He was the eldest son of the founding monarch Onjo and became the heir of throne in the year 10. He became king upon Onjo's death in 28 which was the 46th year of his reign. The Samguk sagi records that "he was a generous man and had presence and esteem".

== Reign ==
The Samguk sagi records many battles against the "Malgal" during Taru's reign. It is unclear who this refers to, as the Mohe tribes are thought to have occupied Manchuria northwest of the northern Korean kingdom Goguryeo, far from Paekche's capital (generally presumed to have been in the present-day Seoul region). The "Malgal" do not appear to refer to the Buyeo people that founded Paekche, nor to the Mahan confederacy tribes subjugated by Paekche. They appear to have remained from the earlier period, incited by Chinese commanderies to attack Paekche. The battles indicate that Paekche as a new power was still expanding its control of the central Korean Peninsula.

Samguk sagi:

- 29 AD, spring, first month. The king paid respects at the shrine of his grandfather, Jumong. Second month. The king made sacrifices to heaven at the southern altar.
- 30 AD, winter, tenth month. Heul-u(屹于) of the eastern district fought the Malgal to the west of Mt. Masu where he overcame them and awarded by the king.
- 31 AD, autumn, eighth month. Gon-u(昆優), of the fortress of Gobon fought the Malgal and defeated them beheading over 200. Ninth month. The king went hunting at the summit of Mt. Hoeng(橫) and killed two deer in succession, and the people admired and praised him.
- 33 AD, spring, first month. His son Giru is made crown prince. Second month. The king ordered that the southern counties of the country begin to cultivate grain.
- 34 AD, spring, second month. The Marshal Bulwark of the Right, Gaeru, died. He was 90 years old. Heulu from the eastern district became Marshal Bulwark of the Right. Summer, fourth month. There was a red mist in the east. Autumn, ninth month. The Malgal attacked and sacked the Masu Fortress burning down houses of the common folk. Winter, tenth month. They attacked the palisade at Mt. Byeong.
- 37 AD, winter, tenth month. The Marshal Bulwark of the Right, Heulu, became Marshal Bulwark of the Left. Jinhoe of the northern district became Marshal Bulwark of the Right. eleventh month. There was an earthquake that sounded like thunder.
- 38 AD, autumn. The grains did not mature. Private brewing of alcohol was prohibited. Winter, tenth month. The king made a tour to console the two districts of the east and west. The poor people could not support themselves, and they were provided with 200 seok of tax grain.
- 48 AD, spring, second month. A great locust tree in the palace grounds rotted on its own. Third month. The Marshal Bulwark of the Left, Heulu, died. The king wept and mourned him.
- 55 AD, spring and summer. There was a drought. The king was worried and released prisoners, even those who had committed capital offenses. Autumn, eight month. The Malgal assaulted the northern borders.
- 56 AD, spring, second month. The king ordered the people of the eastern district to build Ugok Fortress (Korean: 우곡성; Hanja: 牛谷城). This was a preparation against the Malgal.
- 63 AD, winter, tenth month. The king expanded his domain to Nangjagok Fortress. Then he sent messengers rival Korean state Silla to ask to meet them, but they did not come.
- 64 AD, he dispatched soldiers to attack the Wasan Fortress (Korean: 와산성; Hanja: 蛙山城) in Silla (today's Boeun), but they could not take it. Then he moved the soldiers to attack Goeyang Fortress (today's Okcheon or Goesan). Silla dispatched 2,000 soldiers and cavalry who fought back and repelled [the invaders].
- 66 AD, he attacked and captured Silla's Wasan Fortress. 200 men were stationed there to defend it, but Silla won it back.
- 70 AD, soldiers were dispatched to attack Silla.
- 73 AD, summer, fifth month, last day of the month. There was a solar eclipse.
- 74 AD, autumn, eighth month. The generals were sent to invade Silla.
- 75 AD, winter, tenth month. Paekche again attacked Wasan and sacked it.
- 76 AD, autumn, ninth month. The fortress of Wasan was taken back by Silla.
- 77 AD, autumn, ninth month. The king died.

== Family ==
- Father: Onjo of Paekche
- Mother: unknown
  - Brother: name unknown
  - Brother: Tokusa-Ō (德佐王, ?–?) - his name in Paekche would have been Buyeo Deokjwa (扶餘德佐), recorded in the Sakyō shoban (左京諸蕃) section of the Shinsen Shōjiroku as ancestor of several clans making him one of the earliest people from Paekche to settle in Japan.
  - Queen(s): unknown
    - Son: 3rd King, Kiru (己婁王, ?–128) - eldest son, before he became king he was known as Buyeo Giru (扶餘己婁).

== See also ==
- List of monarchs of Korea
- History of Korea

Taru of Paekche House of Buyeo Cadet branch of the House of Go Died: 77
Regnal titles
Preceded by Onjo	King of Paekche; 28–77	Succeeded by Kiru
