= Bu Wiyeom =

Korean general (fl. 1st century BC)

- Hangul: 부위염
- Hanja: 扶尉厭
- RR: Bu Wiyeom
- MR: Pu Wiyŏm

Bu Wiyeom (Korean: 부위염; Hanja: 扶尉厭) was a General of Goguryeo during King Dongmyeong's reign. Little is known about general Bu Wiyeom, except that King Dongmyeong sent him to conquer the Northern Okjeo in 28 BC.

It is unknown whether he was successful or not, but regardless of this, during the 5th century, Okjeo was completely conquered by Gwanggaeto the Great of Goguryeo. It is also known that during the period Bu Wiyeom attacked Okjeo, Lady Yuhwa (Mother of King Dongmyeong.) died.

== Popular culture ==
- Portrayed by Yoon Yong-hyun in the 2006–2007 MBC TV series Jumong.
