= Soseono =

Wife of Dongmyeong Goryeo (66/7 – 6 BC)

Queen consort of Goguryeo
- Tenure: 37 – 18 BC

Queen dowager of Paekche
- Tenure: 18 – 6 BC
- Born: 66/7 BC; Buyeo
- Died: 6 BC (aged 61); Paekche
- Spouse: Wutae; Dongmyeong of Goguryeo
- Issue: Biryu; Onjo
- Father: Yeon Ta-bal

Korean name
- Hangul: 소서노
- Hanja: 召西奴
- RR: Soseono
- MR: Sosŏno

Soseono (Korean: 소서노; Hanja: 召西奴; 66/7 – 6 BC) or Yeon Soseono (연소서노; 延召西奴) was the second wife of King Dongmyeong and a key figure in the establishment of both Goguryeo and Paekche. She was the mother of Biryu and Onjo.

== Establishment of two kingdoms ==
The traditional account from the Annals of Paekche section in the Samguk Sagi states that Soseono was the daughter of Yeon Ta-bal, a wealthy influential figure in Holbon and the second wife of Jumong. The same source states that the chief of the Habaek tribe had given his daughter, Lady Ye, in marriage to Jumong and she was his first wife. Soseono's first husband was Wutae.

After Jumong's eldest son, Yuri, and Yuri's mother, Lady Ye, who were both presumed to have died, returned to Goguryeo, Yuri became the crown prince. Soseono left Goguryeo and took her two sons, Biryu and Onjo, south to found their own kingdom, Paekche.

== Death ==
- According to the Samguk Sagi, Soseono died in 6 BCE at the age of 61 during the 13th years reign of her second son as the first king of Paekche.

== In popular culture ==
- Portrayed by Han Hye-jin in the 2006–2007 MBC TV series Jumong.
- Portrayed by Jung Ae-ri in the 2010–2011 KBS1 TV series The King of Legend.
- Portrayed by Woo Da-young in the 2017 KBS TV series Chronicles of Korea.
