= Tokusa-Ō =

Third son of the founder and first king of Baekje, Onjo of Baekje

- Hangul: 덕좌왕
- Hanja: 德佐王
- Revised Romanization: Deokjwawang
- McCune–Reischauer: Tŏkchwawang

Tokusa-Ō (德佐王, ? – ?) known in Korea as Buyeo Deokjwa (扶餘德佐) was a member of the royal family of Baekje, one of the Three Kingdoms of Korea. He was the third son of the founder and first king, Onjo of Baekje.

He only appears in the Japanese records of Shinsen Shōjiroku.

According to the Shinsen Shōjiroku he is one of the earliest people of Baekje to settle in Japan and is the grandson of Dongmyeong of Goguryeo. Nothing else is known of his life or activities besides that he was ancestor of several clans in Japan.

== Family ==
- Father: Onjo of Baekje - this is controversial but he is at least a descendant of Gusu.
- Mother: unknown
  - Brother: Daru of Baekje (多婁王) - became 2nd King of Baekje.
  - Brother: name unknown
  - Wife: unknown
    - Children: unknown

== See also ==
- List of Monarchs of Korea
- History of Korea
- Three Kingdoms of Korea
