= Oi (general) =

1st-century BC Korean general

- Hangul: 오이
- Hanja: 烏伊
- Revised Romanization: Oi
- McCune–Reischauer: Oi

Oi (Korean: 오이; Hanja: 烏伊) was a general who helped to found the Goguryeo, one of the Three Kingdoms of Korea.

== Biography ==
Oi, Hyŏppo (협보; 陜父), Mari (마리; 摩離), and Chumong were associated as friends. Chumong made them his bodyguards during the time he was at the palace and Oi's career started from this point.

Meanwhile, the two sons of King Geumwa became jealous of Chumong's archery skills and Chumong was forced to leave Dongbuyeo along with his bodyguards. In 37 BC, Chumong became the first king of Goguryeo and reunited all of the five tribes of Jolbon into one kingdom. In 32 BC, Chumong sent General Oi and Pu Punno (부분노; 扶芬奴) to conquer the Haengin state (행인국; 荇人國). Also, Chumong, along with Oi went to spy the Xuantu Commandery, and in order to escape, they killed approx. 500 soldiers.

In 14 BC, he and Mari attacked the Yangmaek state (양맥국; 梁貊國), and Gaogouli County in Chinese Xuantu Commandery during the reign of King Yuri, second ruler of Goguryeo, and eldest son of the King Dongmyeong (Chumong).

== Popular culture ==
- Portrayed by Yeo Ho-min in the 2006–2007 MBC TV series Jumong.
