= Onjo of Paekche =

1st King of Paekche (r. 18 BC – AD 28)

King Onjo
- Eoraha
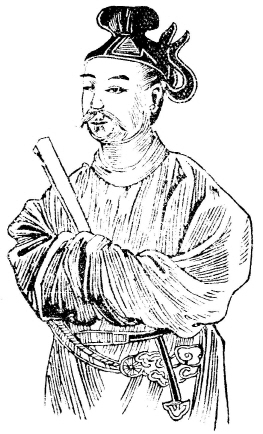
- Portrait of King Onjo

King of Paekche
- Reign: 18 BC - 28 AD
- Coronation: 18 BC
- Predecessor: The founder of the kingdom
- Successor: Daru
- Born: Buyeo Onjo/Eunjo; 36 BC (Estimated); Buyeo
- Died: 28 AD; Wiryeseong
- Issue: Buyeo Daru; Buyeo Deokjwa
- House: Buyeo
- Dynasty: Paekche
- Father: Wutae or Dongmyeong
- Mother: Soseono

Korean name
- Hangul: 온조 어라하
- Hanja: 溫祚 於羅瑕
- RR: Onjo eoraha
- MR: Onjo ŏraha

Onjo (Korean: 온조; Hanja: 溫祚; ?–28, reigned c. 18 BC – AD 28) was the founding monarch of Paekche, one of the Three Kingdoms of Korea. According to the Samguk sagi, he founded the royal family of Paekche.

== Background ==
There are a few theories and legends of Onjo's parentage. One is that he was the third son of King Dongmyeong (Jumong), the founder of the northern Korean kingdom Goguryeo. He was the younger brother of Yuri, who became Goguryeo's second king, and younger brother of Biryu who built small state in Michuhol.

The second theory is that he is the son of Wutae, his mother's first husband. A third legend says that his older brother Biryu was his mother's son with Wutae but Onjo was born after the second marriage with King Dongmyeong.

== Founding and expansion of Paekche ==
Dongmyeong had three sons: Yuri, Biryu, and Onjo. When Yuri, born from Dongmyeong's previous wife in Dongbuyeo, came to Goguryeo and became the heir to the throne, Biryu and Onjo moved south to found their own kingdoms. According to the Samguk yusa, Biryu founded his kingdom in Michuhol (Korean: 미추홀; Hanja: 彌鄒忽), but his didn't last long. Biryu's people joined Sipje after Biryu's death and Onjo renamed it to Paekche. After that, the capital city of Paekche was moved southward from Habuk Wiryeseong because the Malgal were located at the North and Nangnang was located to the East. Both capital cities correspond to land within current Seoul. In 13 BC and 8 BC, the Malgal tribes attacked from the north, and both times, Onjo directly led his armies and won victories over the invaders. In 5 BC, Onjo moved the capital city to a more defensible location south of the Han River, renaming it Hanam Wiryeseong, and sent a messenger to the king of the Mahan confederacy telling him of the recent action.

At this time, Onjo already had plans of conquering Mahan and Jinhan. By 7 AD, he was already preparing his armies for war and finally attacked during 8 AD. In 8 AD, he secretly took his armies across the border, laying the deceit that he was going to hunt in the forests. Soon, all of Mahan except for two fortresses were conquered. The citizens of the last two Mahan fortresses surrendered to Onjo and were given mercy. The Mahan King, however, committed suicide and left a letter for Onjo, asking him to take in Mahan's people with kindness and mercy. Onjo respected the Mahan King's last request and took his people in.

However, according to a recent study, Paekche conquered Mahan's Mokji after the mid-3rd century. In fact, it is presumed to be an article written for the founder about the events of later generations.

Paekche had expanded greatly, and several fortresses were being built every year. Peace lasted for 8 years until 16 AD, when a former Mahan general caused a rebellion. Onjo directly led an army of 5,000 and successfully destroyed the rebellion. Soon after this, the Malgal tribes invaded again during 22 AD, but were once again defeated by Onjo and his army.

== Death and succession ==
Onjo died of natural causes in 28 AD, during the 46th year of his reign. He was succeeded by his eldest son, Daru. Onjo laid the foundations for a powerful dynasty that would last for 678 years and 31 rulers.

== Samguk sagi ==
"The first ancestor of the Paekche [kings] was King Onjo. His father was Chumo, also known as Jumong. From Bukbuyeo he escaped peril and arrived in Jolbon Buyeo. The king of Buyeo was without a male child, and only had three daughters. Upon seeing Jumong, they knew he was not an ordinary man, and made his second daughter [Jumong's] wife. Shortly thereafter, the king of Buyeo died. Jumong succeeded him to the throne and had two children. The oldest was called Biryu, and the next was called Onjo (it is also said that Jumong went to Jolbon and married a woman from Wolgun, and that he had two sons [by her]). Now Jumong, when he was in Bukbuyeo, had one son, who came and became the crown prince. Biryu and Onjo were afraid that they would not be treated well by the one who had become crown prince, and so with Ogan, Mayeo, and some other ten ministers went south with a large number of commoners following them. Then they reached Mt. Hansan and climbed themselves to the summit to look upon the land where they were. Biryu wanted to settle on the beach, and the ten ministers admonished him, saying "But the land to the south of the river: in the north it is bordered by the Han river, and the East occupied by high mountain peaks; the south faces marshland, and the west is guarded by the sea. This benefits of this divinely strategic land possess a fate not easily acquired. Why should you not make your capital in this place? However Biryu did not listen, and divided the people, and he reverted to Michuhol and settled there. Onjo made his capital south of the river in Wiryeseong, and the ten ministers assisted him, and the country was called Sipje. This happened in the third year of Hongjia, during the reign of Emperor Cheng of the Early Han. Biryu was in Michu, where the earth was wet and the rivers salty, and could not dwell in security. Then he returned to look upon Wirye, where the capital and its villages were stable as a three-legged cauldron, and the people dwelt in security. Then he was ashamed and died. His ministers and people all returned to Wirye. Afterwards in the times that came the people were happy and obedient, and the name [of the kingdom] was changed to Paekche. Its lineage and that of Kogyureo are both out of Buyeo, therefore they took the surname Buyeo. One version says, the first ancestor was King Biryu, and that his father was Utae, an illegitimate grandson of the king of Bukbuyeo Hae Buru. His mother was Soseono, a daughter of Yeon Ta-bal (延陀勃), a man of Jolbon. She was married to Utae and gave birth to two sons. The oldest was called Biryu, and the younger called Onjo. Utae died and she was widowed, and settled in Jolbon. After some time Jumong was not well-treated in Buyeo – this was during the second year of Jianzhao in early Han [during the reign of Emperor Yuan]. In spring of the second month, he fled south to Jolbon and established the capital of Goguryeo. He married Soseono and she became his consort, and because she, in the creation of his realm, rendered great assistance, Jumong especially favored them and received Biryu and the other as if they were his own sons. When Jumong was in Buyeo he had a child Yuryu by a woman of the Ye clan, and when he came he was made crown prince and the one who would succeed him. Therefore, Biryu asked his younger brother Onjo, saying "Originally the great king fled the difficulties in Buyeo and escaped here. Our mother's clan poured out the riches of their house to aid in the endeavor [of creating the kingdom], and her toils were many. Now the great king has left this world, and the state has fallen to Yuryu, and if we were to follow along here it would be as depressing as a tumor. Would it not be respectful to our mother's clan if we went to the south and divined the land, and established a separate capital?" Then he and his brother many factions, and crossed the Pae and Dae rivers, and arrived in Michuhol and settled there. The Pei Shih and Book of Sui both tell that one descendant of Dongmyeong was Gutae who was sincere in his benevolence. When he first established his country in the territory of the former commandery of Daifang, the prefect of the Han territory of Liaodong, Gongsun Du, had his daughter marry [Gutae]. Afterwards [his country] became a powerful state among the Eastern Barbarians. It is unknown which is true [of these accounts]."

- 18 BC, spring, fifth month. The court of King Dongmyeong was established.
- 17 BC, spring, first month. The king asked the myriad ministers, saying, "The Mohe assemble on my northern border, and these people are fierce and have many tricks. We should ready our soldiers, store up grain, and make a plan for our defense. Third month. The king, because the clan leader Euleum possessed both knowledge and bravery, appointed him Marshal Bulwark of the Right, and entrusted him with matters relating to the soldiers and horses.
- 16 BC, autumn, ninth month. The Mohe invaded the northern border. The king led powerful soldiers to a quick attack and defeated them handily. The rebels who lived to return were only one or two of every ten. Winter, tenth month. There was lightning, and the peaches and plums blossomed.
- 15 BC, spring and summer, there was drought, famine, and plague. Autumn, eighth month. Envoys were sent to Lelang to cultivate favor.
- 14 BC, winter, tenth month. The king took a tour of the northern regions to console them. He went hunting and got a supernal deer.
- 13 BC, autumn, seventh month, last day of the month (辛未晦). There was a solar eclipse.
- 11 BC, spring, second month. Three thousand of the Mohe came and surrounded Wiryeseong. The king shut the fort and would not go out. After ten days time the rebels had depleted their stores and returned. The king led a sharp thrust and chased them to the Daebuhyeon, where he fought and overcame them. Over 500 were killed or captured. Autumn, seventh month. The fort of Masuseong was constructed, and a palisade was erected at Mt. Byeongsan. The prefect of Lelang sent a messenger to report: "Recently you inquired about connecting in good favor, with the intention of making us like the same family. But now at the boundary of our territory you have built a fortress and a palisade. Is this some scheme to munch away [our territory] like a silkworm? If there is no change in our former good relations, then destroy the fort and tear down the palisade, and accordingly we will feel no more doubt. However, if you do not approve, then we request a battle to decide winner and loser.

Then the king said, "Doing construction at strategic points and protecting the country has been the usual way of things from the past up to now. How dare you change our peaceful relations because of this. You should not have any doubts about this matter! If you presume to lead out a force because of this, then accordingly our tiny country will await you." Therefore, peaceful relations with Lelang were lost.

- 9 BC, autumn, ninth month. The king went hunting and got a supernal deer, which was sent to Mahan. Winter, tenth month. The Mohe invaded the northern frontier. The king dispatched 200 soldiers and they gave battle on the bank of the Gonmi river. Our army failed, and set in at Mt. Cheongbok to defend themselves. The king himself led 100 elite cavalry and went out to Bonghyeon to help them. The bandits saw this and retreated.
- 8 BC, summer, fourth month. Lelang sent the Mohe to attack the palisade at Mt. Byeongsan. They killed or captured over 100 people. In autumn, seventh month, the twin palisades of Mt. Doksan and Gucheon River were constructed, thereby blocking the road to Lelang.
- 6 BC, spring, second month. In the king's capital and old woman changed into a man, and five tigers came into the fort. The king's mother died. She was 61 years old. Summer, fifth month. The king asked his ministers, saying, "The state in the east is Lelang and to the north are the Mohe, and they attack our borders. Days of peace are few, and now there are incidents of strange omens that are seen again and again. Also, the country's mother has passed, and things will not settle down on their own. It is necessary to move the country. Earlier I went took a look at the land south of the Han river where the soil is fertile and suitable for our capital. There we can plan to have long-lasting stability." Autumn, seventh month. At the foot of Mt. Chwihan a palisade was built, and they relocated the households of Wiryeseong. Eighth month. A messenger was dispatched to the Mahan to tell them the capital had been moved, and to fix the borders of the country. In the north it extended to the river, in the south to the Hanung river, in the west to the great sea, and in the east up to Juyang. Ninth month. A fort was built.
- 5 BC, spring, first month. The capital was relocated. Second month. The king made a tour to console settlements, and he encouraged agriculture. Autumn, seventh month. The fortress was built to the northwest of the Han river, and the people of Hanseong were divided [to occupy it].
- 4 BC, spring, first month. The new palace was built, and it was economical without being crude. They stood in the court to honor the king's mother.
- 1 BC, winter, tenth month. The Mohe executed an ambush, and the king led soldiers against them to fight at the Chiljung river. Their chieftain, Somo, was captured and sent to Mahan. The rest of the brigands were buried. 11th month. The king wanted to attack Lelang at the fortress of Mt. Udu, and he went to Gugok when there was heavy snow and he had to turn back.
- 1 AD, spring, second month. The king built a great altar and personally offered sacrifices to heaven. Five strange birds flew by.
- 3 AD, autumn, eighth month. The two fortresses of Seokdu and Gobok were constructed. Ninth month. The king led 1,000 infantry and cavalry to Yeopbu in Liaodong, where he came across Mohe brigands, fought, and defeated them. The captured slaves were divided up as rewards among the officers.
- 5 AD, autumn, seventh month. The king made the palisade of Ungcheon. The king of Mahan sent envoys to reproach him, saying "When the king first crossed the river and had no place set foot, I ceded him 100 ri of land in the northeast in peace. This reception of the king was not ungenerous, and should be thought of and mutually returned. Now in your country your people have completely assembled, and you say that we are not enemies. However, you construct fortresses and moats, and invade our borders. Is this righteousness?" The king was ashamed and destroyed the palisade.
- 6 AD, spring, second month. The waters of the well in the palace overflowed violently. In the house of a man in Hanseong a horse gave birth to a cow with one head and two bodies. A fortune-teller said, "The well water overflowed, and this is an omen of prosperity for the great king. The cow with one head and two bodies means the great king should annex the neighboring countries. The king heard this and was pleased. Afterwards he had the intention to swallow up Chin[han] and Ma[han].
- 7 AD, autumn, seventh month. The king said, "Mahan is gradually weakening, and the hearts of the upper and lower classes are moving apart. This condition cannot continue for long. If it becomes annexed to another land, our lips will be lost and our teeth cold [buffer will be removed – see Best 218]. Regret [over not acting] would not make up for it, and so we should act first and take it, and thereby avoid later troubles. Winter, tenth month. The king led men out saying he was going hunting, but then he invaded Mahan. Afterwards, this country and its villages were annexed, and only the two fortresses of Mt. Wonsan and Geumhyeon were resolutely defended and did not fall.
- 8 AD, summer, fourth month. The two fortresses fell. These people were relocated to north of Mt. Hansan. Mahan was overthrown. Autumn, seventh month. The fortress of Mt. Daedu was constructed.
- 9 AD, spring, second month. The king's oldest son, Daru, was made crown prince. He was entrusted with matters relating to soldiers both domestically and abroad. Summer, fourth month. There was a frost and it damaged the barley.
- 12 AD, spring, first month. The households of people in the country were divided into northern and southern groups. Summer, fourth month. It hailed. Fifth month. There was an earthquake. Sixth month. Again there was an earthquake.
- 14 AD, spring and summer. There was a great drought, and the people starved and ate each other. There were many incidents of robbery. The king pacified and consoled the people. Autumn, eighth month. In addition, the two divisions of east and west established.
- 15 AD, winter, tenth month. An old general from Mahan, Jugeun, took possession of the fort at Ugok and rebelled. The king himself led 5,000 soldiers to attack him. Jugeun hanged himself. His body was cut in half at the waist, and also his wife and children were executed.
- 17 AD, autumn, seventh month. The fortress of Tangjeong was constructed. The people from the fortress at Daedu were divided up and settled it. Eighth month. The two fortresses of Mt. Jeupwon and Geumhyeon were repaired, and the fortress of Gosaburi was constructed.
- 18 AD, spring, third month. There was giant hail the size of chicken eggs, and any birds that happened to be hit died. Summer, fourth month. There was a drought. It lasted until the sixth month when it rained again. The settlements to the northeast of the Han river starved and went wild, and over 1,000 households were lost to Goguryeo. The area between the Pae and Dae rivers was empty and no one lived there.
- 19 AD, spring, second month. The king made a tour and consoled the people, and to the east he went as far as Juyang, and to the north as far as the Pae river. After five ten-day periods he returned. Third month. The king dispatched messengers to encourage farming and sericulture. They also saw to the non-urgent complaints of the people. They were all removed. Winter, tenth month. The king constructed a great altar and made sacrifices to heaven.
- 22 AD, autumn, ninth month. The Mohe came and attacked the fortress of Sulcheon. Winter, eleventh month. They again attacked, this time the fort at Buheyon. They killed and plundered over 100 people. The king ordered 200 elite cavalry to repel them.
- 24 AD, spring, first month. The Marshal Bulwark of the Right, Euleum, died. The king appointed Gaeru of the northern district Marshal Bulwark of the Right. Gaeru was originally from Buyeo, and he was deeply religious and though he was over 70 years old his back was strong and he made no mistakes. Therefore, he was chosen. Second month. Men fifteen years old or more from settlements northeast of the Han river were dispatched to repair Wiryeseong.
- 25 AD, autumn, eight month. The king went hunting for five days in the fields of Mt. Asan. Ninth month. Over 100 wild geese assembled at the king's palace. A fortune-teller said: "Wild geese are a symbol of the people. In the future, people will come from far away to submit to you. Winter, tenth month. From Okjeo in the south twenty families, including that of Gu Pahae, came to Buyang and surrendered themselves. The king accepted and had them settle to the west of Mt. Hansan.
- 27 AD, spring and summer. There was a great drought, and the grass and trees burned and dried out. Winter, tenth month. There was a great earthquake. People's homes collapsed.
- 28 AD, spring, second month. The king died.

== Family ==
- Father: Wutae, an illegitimate grandson of the king of Bukbuyeo Hae Buru
- Step-father: Dongmyeong of Goguryeo (Jumong)
  - Step-brother: Yuri of Goguryeo
- Mother: So Seo-no
  - Brother: Biryu
  - Queen: name unknown
    - 1st son: 2nd King, Daru (多婁王, ?–77) - before he became king he was known as Buyeo Daru (扶餘多婁).
    - 2nd son: name unknown
    - 3rd son: Tokusa-Ō (德佐王, ?–?) - his name in Paekche would have been Buyeo Deokjwa (扶餘德佐), recorded in the Sakyō shoban (左京諸蕃) section of the Shinsen Shōjiroku as ancestor of several clans making him one of the earliest people from Paekche to settle in Japan.

== Popular culture ==
- Portrayed by Kim Seok in the 2006 MBC TV series Jumong.
- Portrayed by Kim Joo-young in the 2010–11 KBS1 TV series The King of Legend.
- Portrayed by Cho Chi-hun in the 2017 KBS TV series Chronicles of Korea.
- Portrayed by Nam Ki-hoon in the 2023 TV series Destined With You

== See also ==
- Wiryeseong
- History of Korea
- List of Korean monarchs
- Dongmyeong of Goguryeo
- Wutae
- Soseono
- Yuri of Goguryeo
- Biryu

Onjo of Paekche House of Buyeo Cadet branch of the House of Go Died: 28 AD
Regnal titles
New creation	King of Baekje; 18 BC – 28 AD	Succeeded by Daru
