= Kiru of Paekche =

3rd King of Paekche (r. 77–128)

- Hangul: 부여기루
- Hanja: 扶餘己婁
- RR: Buyeo Giru
- MR: Puyŏ Kiru

Monarch name
- Hangul: 기루왕
- Hanja: 己婁王
- RR: Giruwang
- MR: Kiruwang

Kiru (died 128, r. 77–128) was the third king of Paekche, one of the Three Kingdoms of Korea.

== Background ==
He was the eldest son of King Daru and became the heir to the throne in the year 33. He became king upon Daru's death in 77 which was the 50th year of his reign. The Samguk sagi records that "his knowledge was vast and he did not stay his intentions with minor details".

== Reign ==
Little is known about the details of his reign. The Samguk sagi records several natural disasters, including earthquake, drought, and typhoon, thought to indicate ill omen for the kingdom.

He began to invade outskirts of the rival Korean kingdom Silla in 85, but signed a peace treaty in 105. Paekche and Silla were at peace thereafter. In 125, Kiru sent help to Silla at Jima's request, to repel a Malgal invasion. As there was no enemy to the east side of Paekche, he tied with Goguryeo, sending 10,000 troops to Xuantu Commandery in 122.

Samguk sagi:

- 85 AD, spring, first month. Soldiers were dispatched to attack the borders of Silla. Summer, ninth month. A new star was seen in the Purple Forbidden Enclosure.
- 87 AD, autumn, eight month, last day of the month. There was a solar eclipse.
- 89 AD, summer, sixth month. There was an earthquake that broke and sank the houses of the people. Many died.
- 90 AD, spring, third month. There was a great drought came causing barley to not grow. Summer, sixth month. There was a strong wind that uprooted trees.
- 92 AD, summer, sixth month, first day of the month. There was a solar eclipse.
- 93 AD, autumn, eighth month. Five boulders all fell down at the same time from the peak of Mt. Hoeng.
- 97 AD, summer, fourth month. Two dragons were seen at the Han River.
- 99 AD, autumn, eighth month. There was a frost that killed the beans. Winter, tenth month. There was rain and hail.
- 103 AD, The king went hunting at Mt. Han. He killed a supernal deer.
- 105 AD, Messengers were dispatched to Silla to sue for peace.
- 107 AD, winter. There was no rain.
- 108 AD, spring and summer. There was a drought and people resorted to cannibalism. Autumn, seventh month. The Malgal attacked Ugok Fortress (Korean: 우곡성; Hanja: 牛谷城), plundered, then stealing the people away returned.
- 111 AD, spring, third month. There was an earthquake. Winter, tenth month. There was another tremor.
- 113 AD, Messengers were dispatched to make inquiries of Silla.
- 116 AD, summer, fourth month. Cranes nested above the gate of the capital. Sixth month. There was a lot of rain for ten days. The Han River overflowed and destroyed the houses of the people. Autumn, seventh month. The king ordered the authorities to see to the fields that were damaged by water.
- 125 AD, Silla was invaded by the Malgal. They sent a written request for soldiers. The king dispatched five generals with their armies to rescue them.
- 128 AD, winter, 11th month. The king died.

== Family ==
- Father: Daru of Baekje
- Mother: unknown
  - Queen(s): unknown
    - 1st son: 4th King, Gaeru of Baekje (蓋婁王, ?–166) – before he became king he was known as Buyeo Gaeru (扶餘蓋婁).
    - 2nd son: Buyeo Ji (扶餘質, ?–?) – in April, 242 he was appointed as the official Ubo (右輔). (disputed offspring)

== See also ==
- List of monarchs of Korea
- History of Korea

== Sources ==
- Content in this article was copied from Samguk Sagi Scroll 23 at the Shoki Wiki, which is licensed under the Creative Commons Attribution-Share Alike 3.0 (Unported) (CC-BY-SA 3.0) license.
- The Academy of Korean Studies
- Korea Britannica

Kiru of Paekche House of Buyeo Cadet branch of the House of Go Died: 128
Regnal titles
Preceded by Daru	King of Paekche; 77–128	Succeeded by Gaeru
