= Yongin Daejanggeum Park =

Outdoor film set in Yongin, South Korea

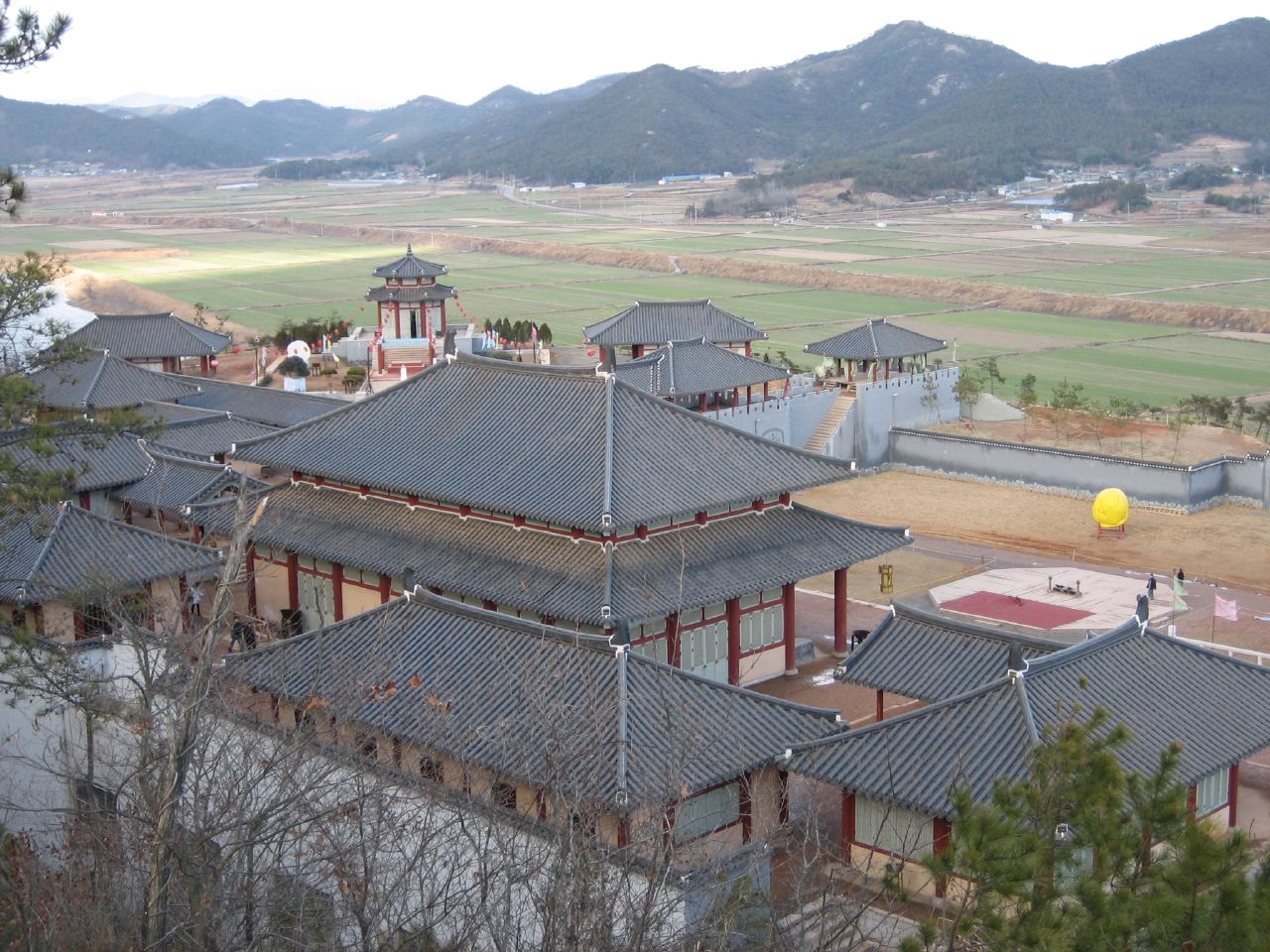
- Interactive map of Yongin Daejanggeum Park
- Location: Yongin, Gyeonggi, South Korea
- Coordinates: 37.121202°N 127.337052°E
- Status: Operating
- Opened: June 21, 2011
- Owner: Munhwa Broadcasting Corporation
- Theme: Samguk; Goryeo; Joseon
- Area: 2,500,000 square metres (250 ha)
- Website: djgpark.imbc.com

Korean name
- Hangul: 용인 대장금 파크
- Hanja: 龍仁 大長今 파크
- RR: Yongin daejanggeum pakeu
- MR: Yongin taejanggŭm p'ak'ŭ

Yongin Daejanggeum Park (Korean: 용인 대장금 파크; RR: Yongin daejanggeum pakeu), previously known as MBC Dramia (Korean: MBC 드라미아), is an outdoor film set, owned by Munhwa Broadcasting Corporation, located in the city of Yongin, Gyeonggi Province, South Korea.

It is the largest open set in South Korea. Through meticulous research, it recreates streets and houses from the Three Kingdoms period to the Joseon Dynasty. In addition to historical dramas, it actively shoots modern dramas, movies, and commercials, and many MBC historical dramas such as Jumong, Yi San, Dong Yi, The Rebel, and The Emperor: Owner of the Mask have been filmed here. Hallyu fans continue to visit here because of the excitement of viewing the set and experiencing royal costumes.

== Background ==
Built in 2005, the site comprises a total area of 2,500,000m^{2}. out of which actual sets take up 165,000 m^{2}, The complex features permanent sets imitating buildings from the Samguk, Goryeo and Joseon periods, and it functions as an interactive center for hallyu. Its name MBC Dramia was created from the words "drama" and "utopia". Historical drama series like Moon Embracing the Sun, Dong Yi and Queen Seondeok were shot there.

The complex was opened to visitors and tourists on June 21, 2011 for the first time. Recently in 2015, it was renamed to its current name Yongin Daejanggeum Park, based on the titular character of MBC's 2003 historical drama Dae Jang Geum, for promotional reasons.

== Series filmed at Yongin MBC Daejanggeum Park ==
The following TV series were shot at Yongin MBC Daejanggeum Park:

- Shin Don (2005)
- Jumong (2006)
- Yi San (2007)
- Queen Seondeok (2009)
- Dong Yi (2010)
- The Duo (2011)
- Gyebaek (2011)
- Moon Embracing the Sun (2012)
- God of War (2012)
- Dr. Jin (2012)
- Arang and the Magistrate (2012)
- The King's Doctor (2012)
- Hur Jun, The Original Story (2013)
- Gu Family Book (2013)
- Goddess of Fire (2013)
- The King's Daughter, Soo Baek-hyang (2014)
- Empress Ki (2014)
- Triangle (2014)
- The Night Watchman's Journal (2014)
- Shine or Go Crazy (2015)
- Splendid Politics (2015)
- Scholar Who Walks the Night (2015)
- Splash Splash Love (2015)
- Jang Yeong-sil (2016)
- Flowers of the Prison (2016)
- The Rebel (2017)
- The Emperor: Owner of the Mask (2017)
- The King in Love (2017)
- The Crowned Clown (2019)
- Haechi (2019)
- Extraordinary You (2019)
- Rookie Historian Goo Hae-ryung (2019)
- My Country (2019)
- Mr. Queen (2020)
- The King's Affection (2021)
- The Red Sleeve (2021)
- Bloody Heart (2022)
- The Forbidden Marriage (2022)

== Other uses ==
=== Music videos ===
- Stray Kids - "Double Knot (English Ver.)" Performance Video (2020)
- Agust D (BTS' Suga) - "Daechwita" (2020)
- ONEUS - "가자 (LIT) (Taekwondo Ver.)" Performance Video (2021)
- GHOST9 - "Seoul" (2021)
- KINGDOM - "승천 (Ascension)" (2022)
- Stray Kids - "Walkin On Water" (2024)
- Stray Kids - " 신선놀음 (DIVINE)" (2025)

== Gallery ==
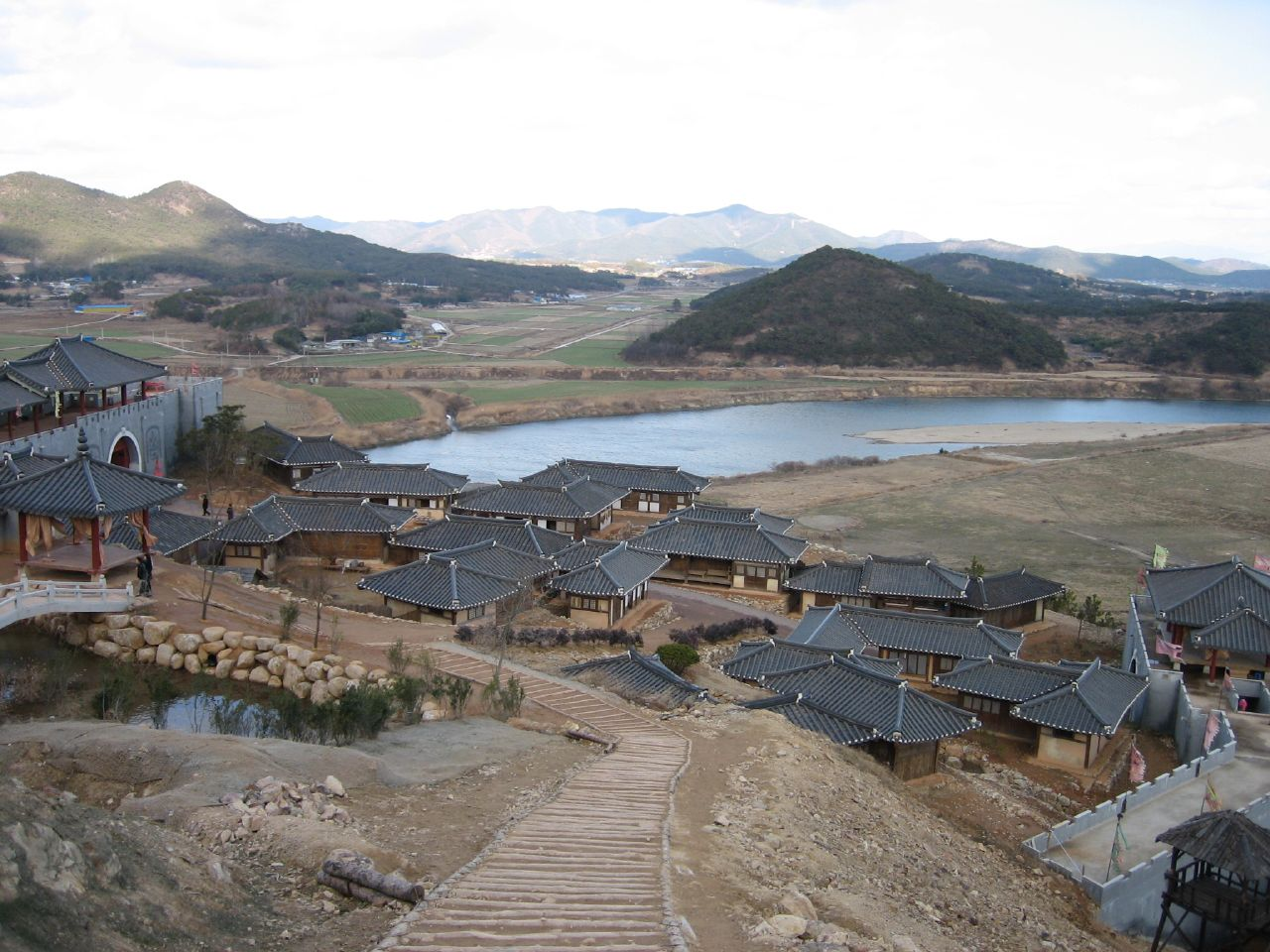

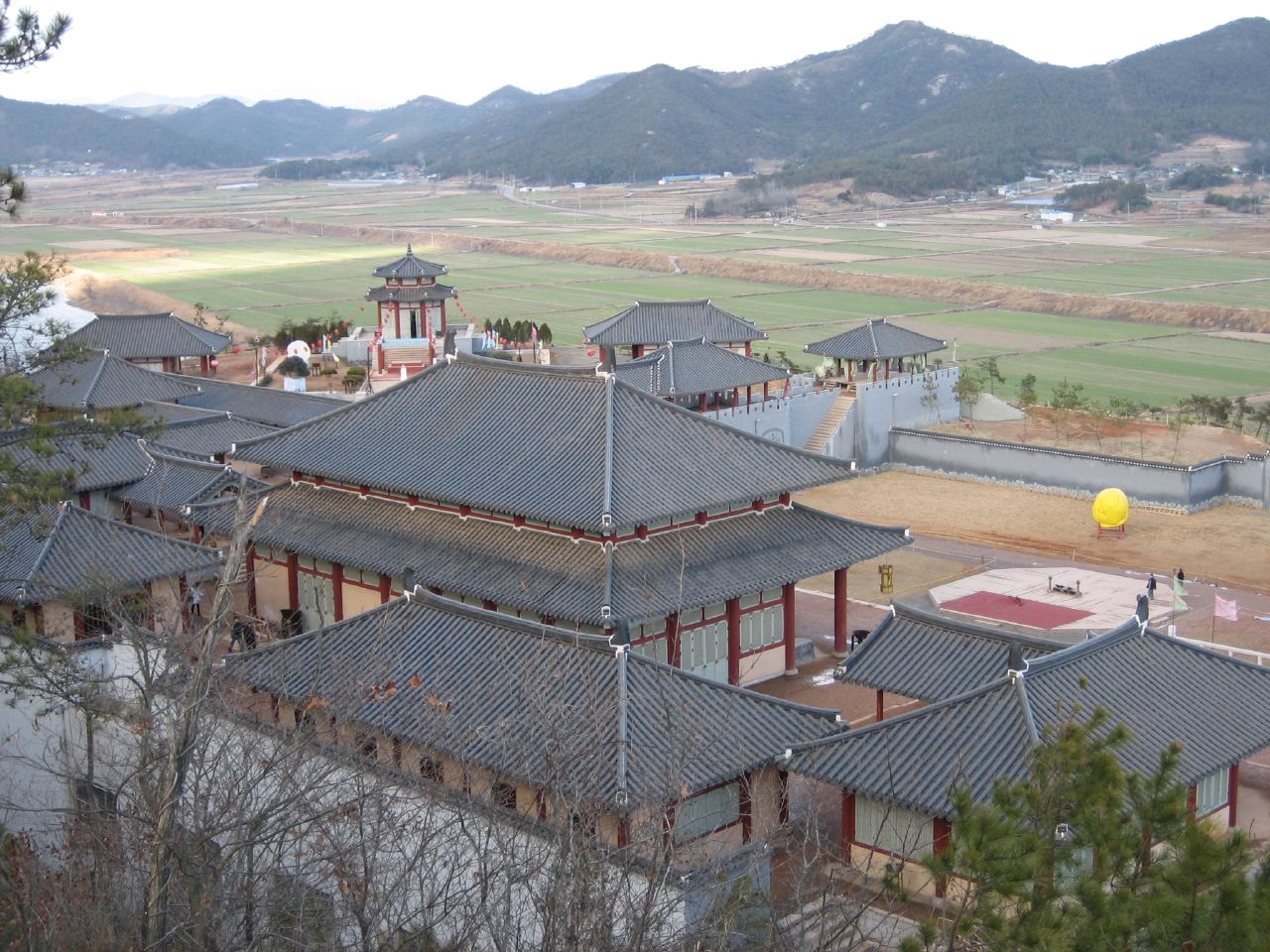

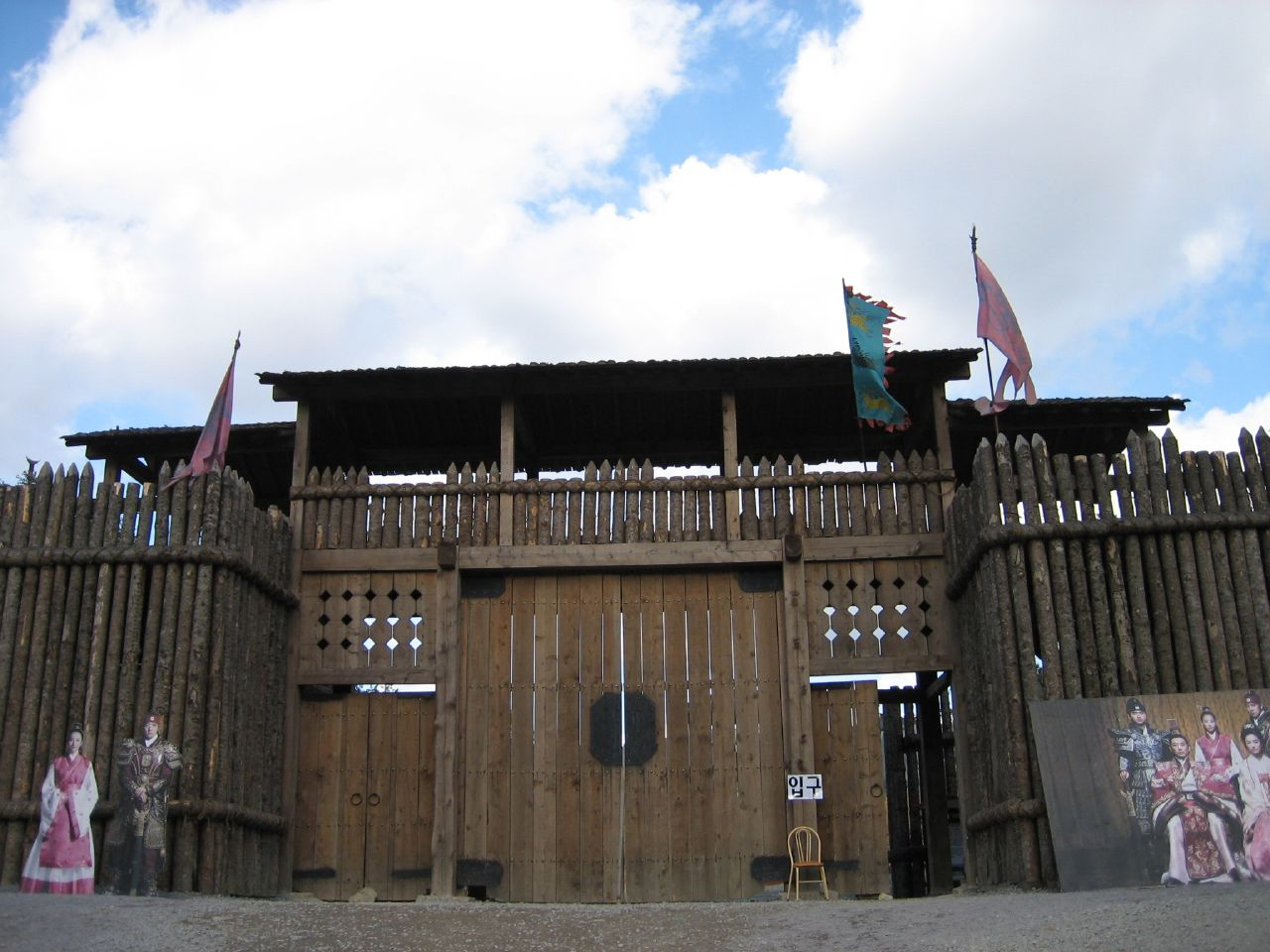

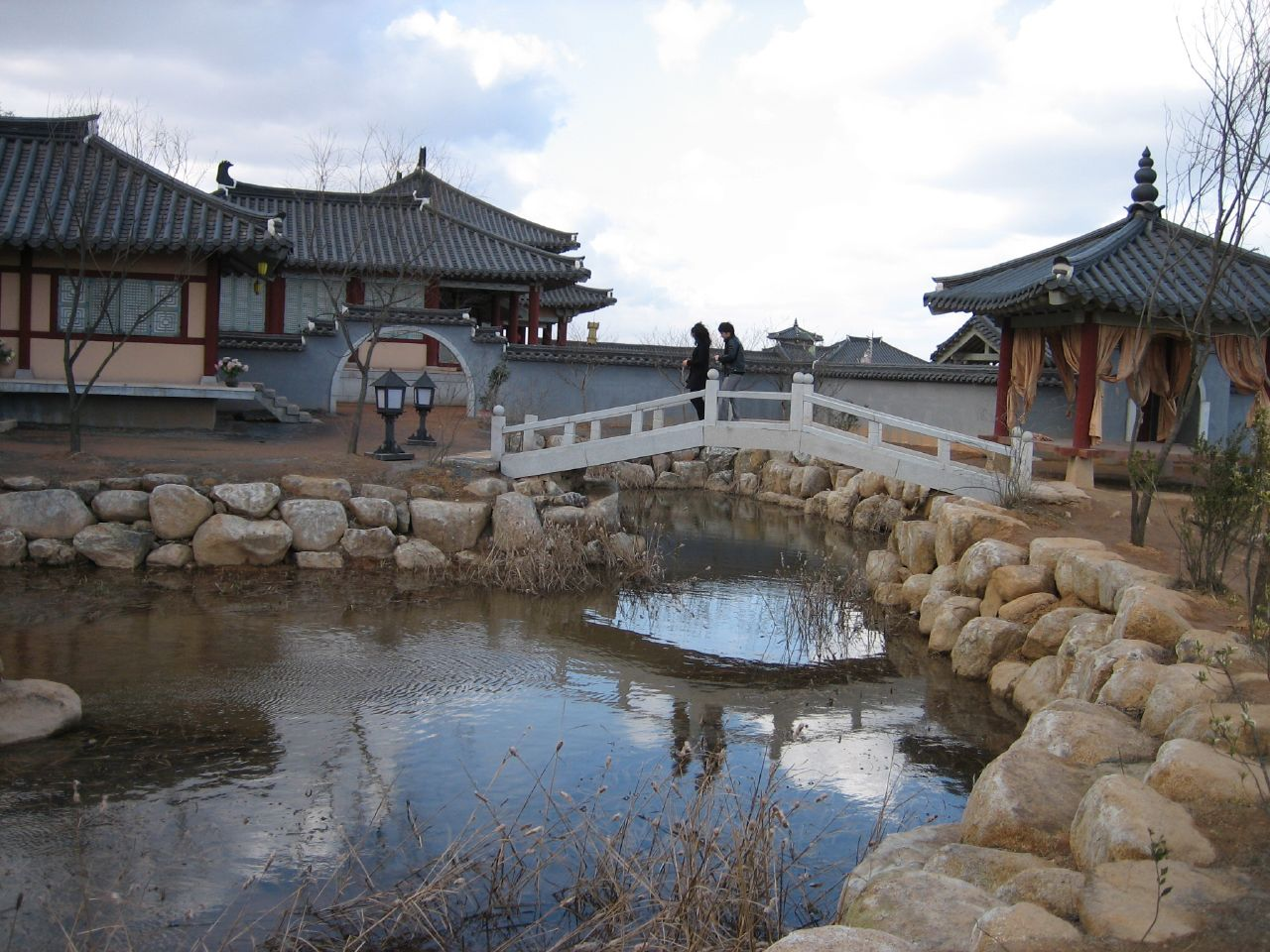

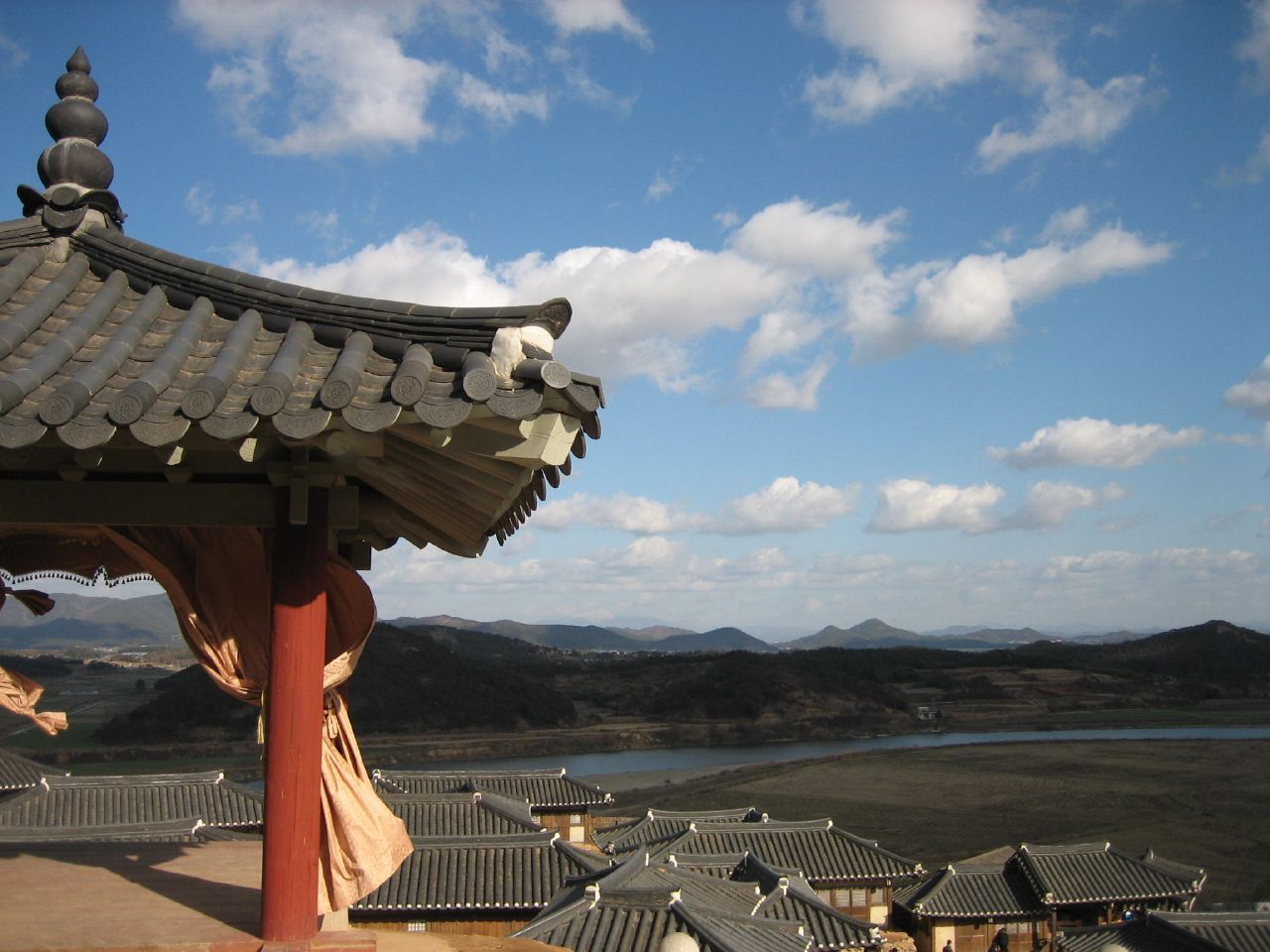

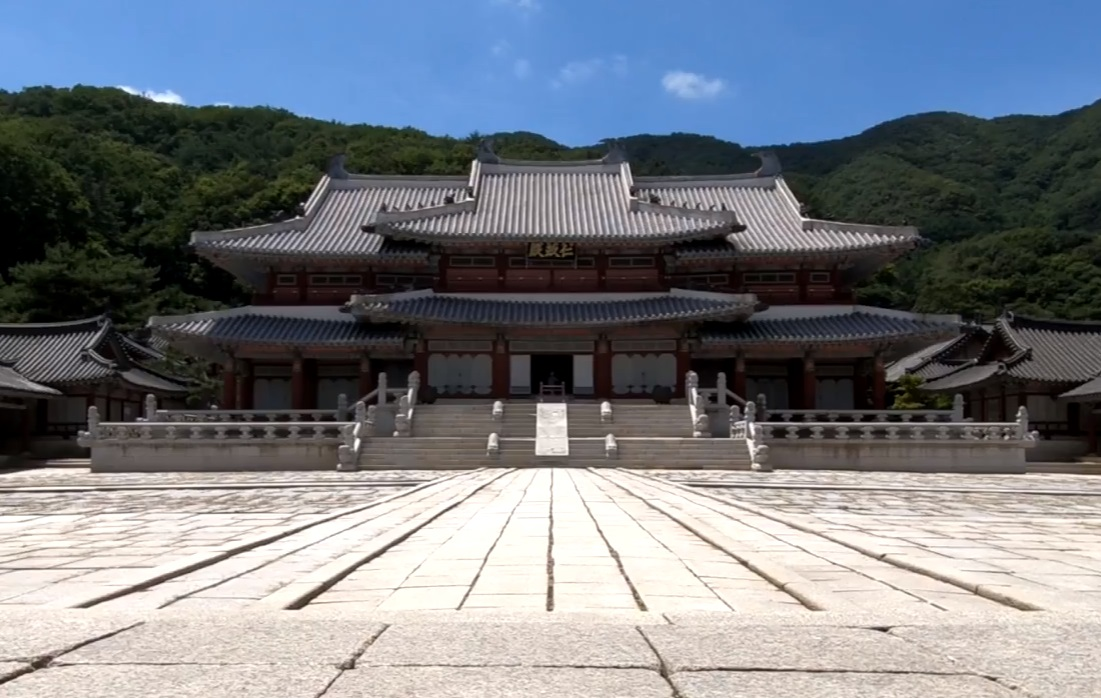

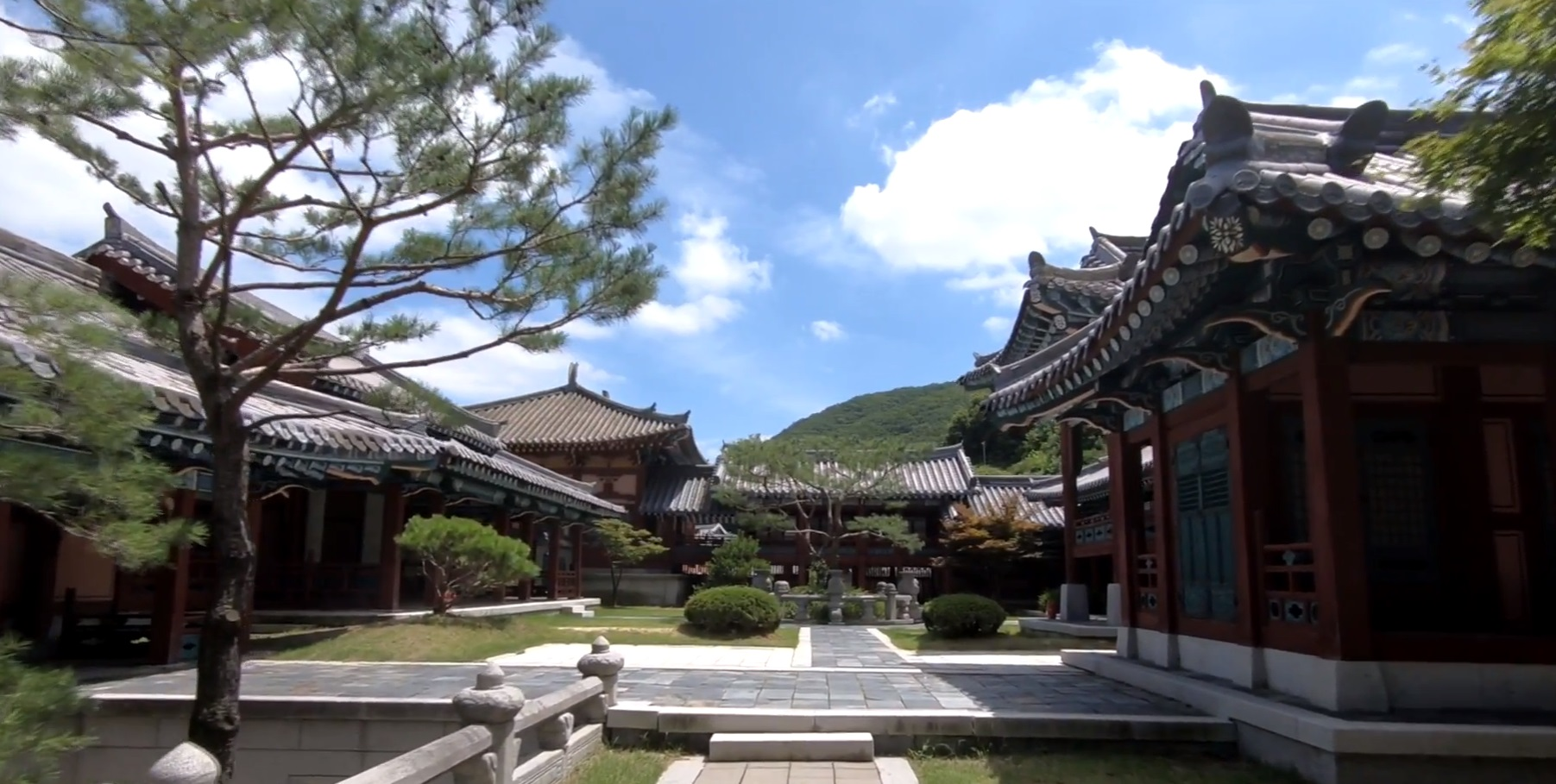

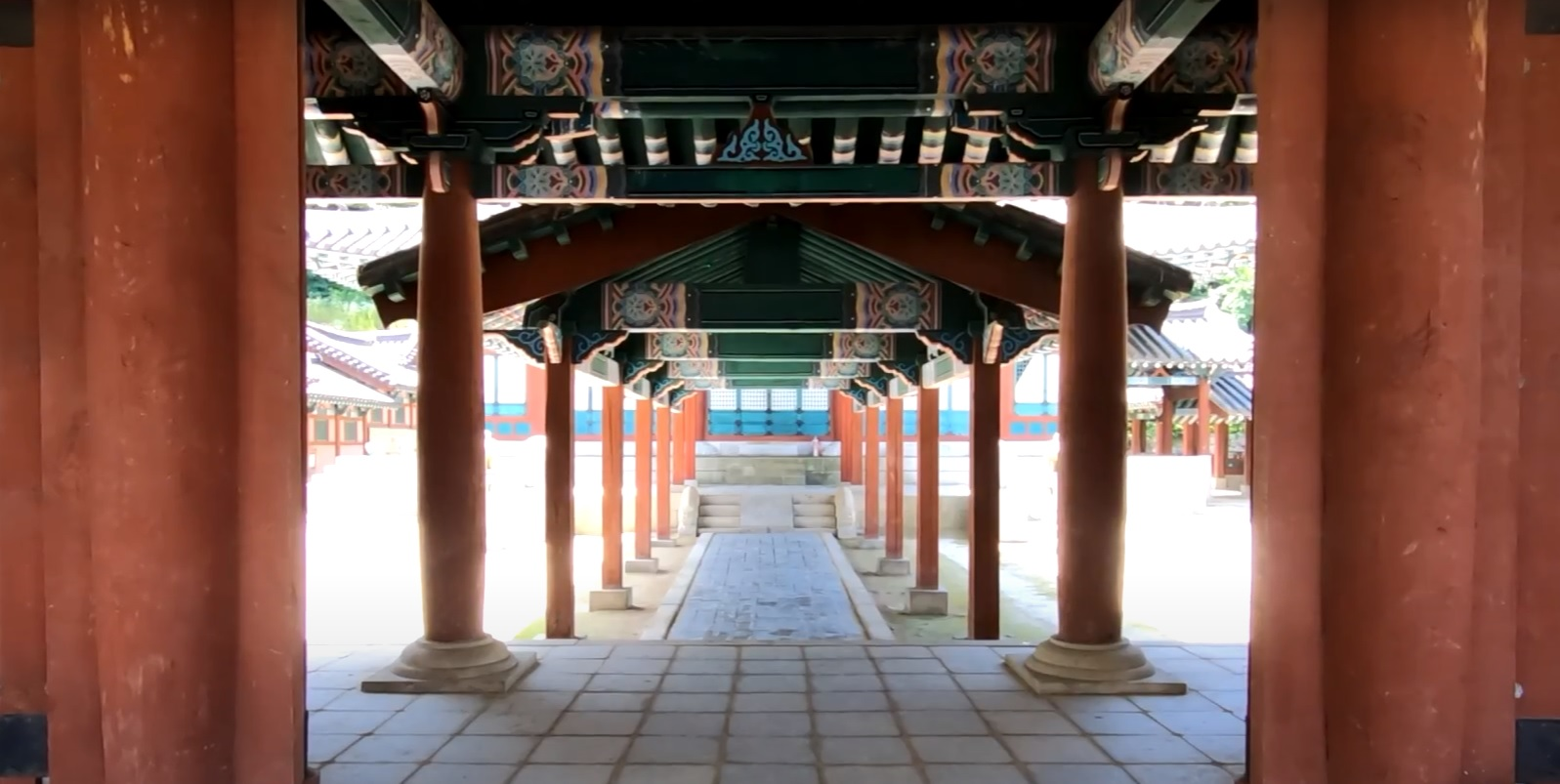

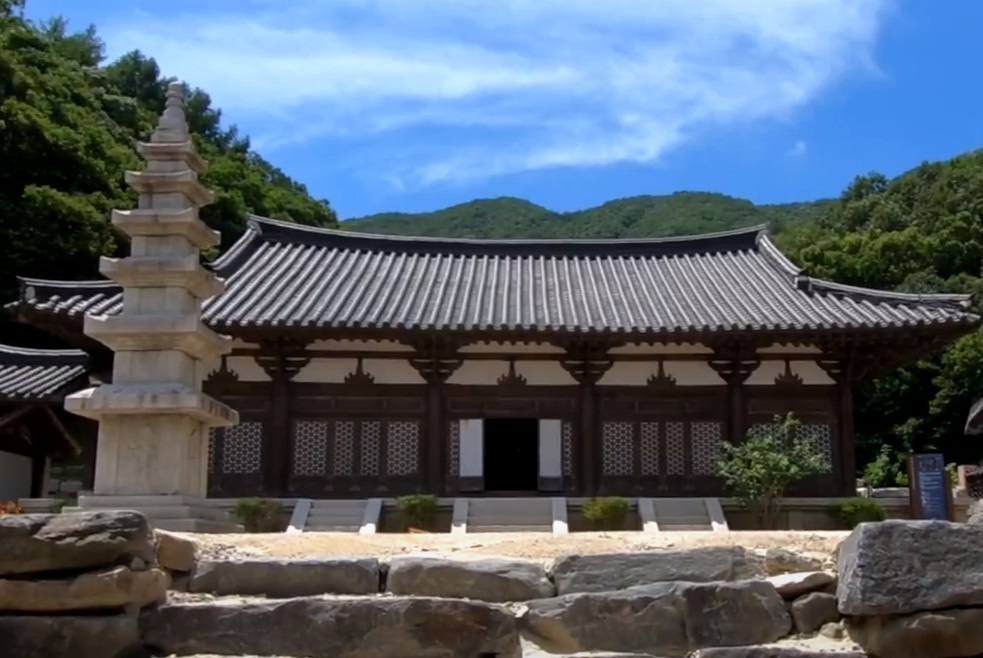

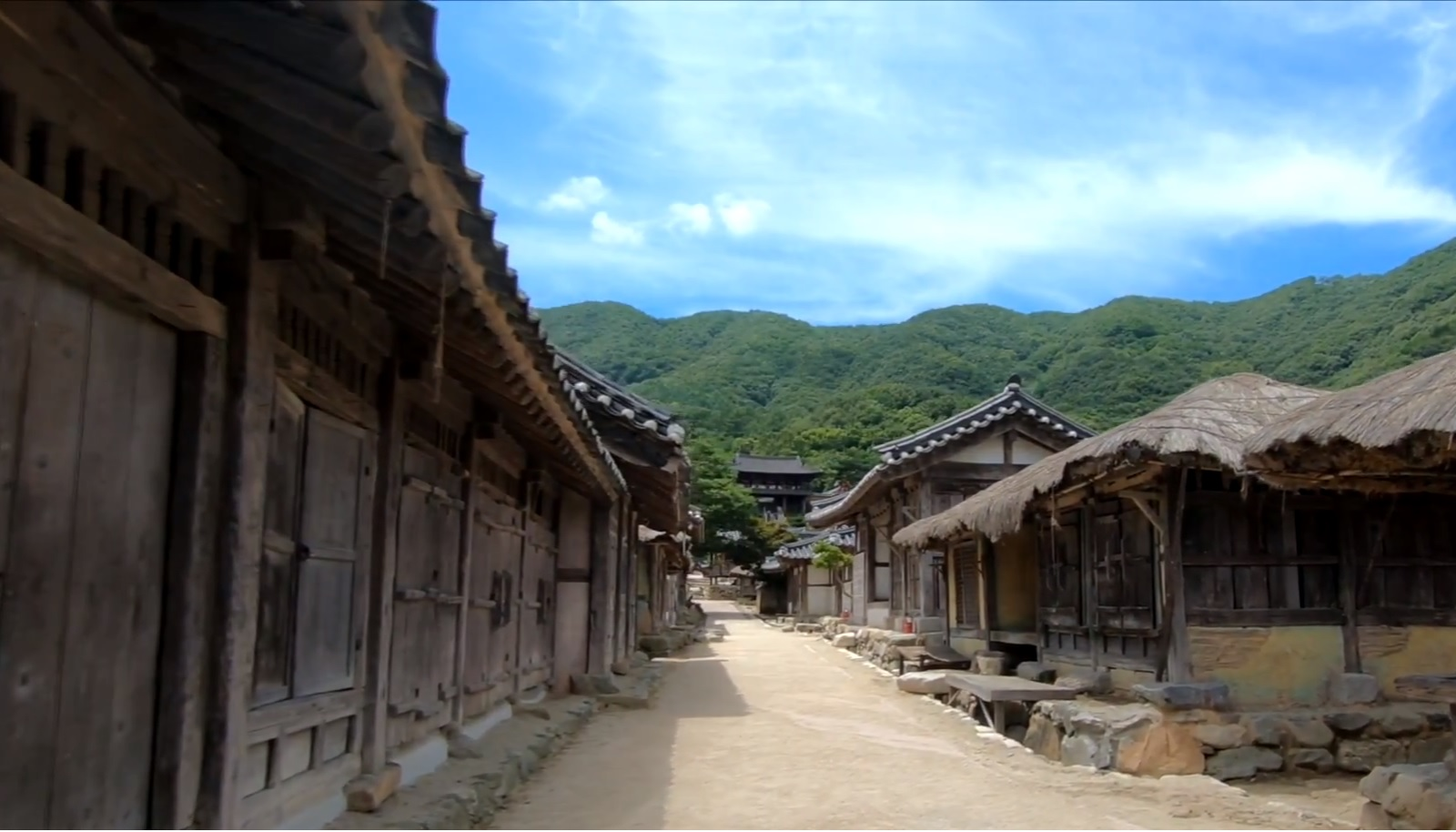

== See also ==
- Daejanggeum Theme Park

== Available facilities ==
- Viewing facilities - Open studio (set) viewing
- Experience facilities (Dreamwalking) - Costume experience: Drama costume experience - Photography: Take pictures with drama characters (instant printing possible)
- Convenience facilities - Cafe, vending machine - Camping site
