= Lady Ye =

First wife of Dongmyeong of Goguryeo

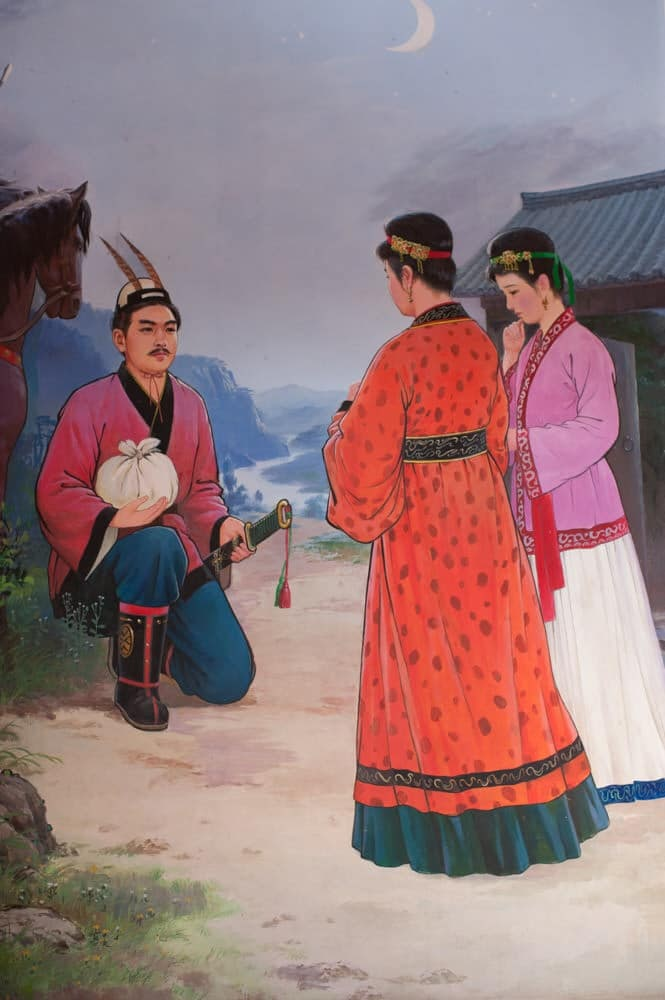

Lady Ye (Korean: 예씨 부인; Hanja: 禮氏 夫人) was the first wife of Dongmyeong of Goguryeo and mother of his successor, King Yuri.

== Life ==
When Dongmyeong was in Buyeo, he married Lady Ye and she became pregnant before he left the country due to threats from Daeso. Later, she gave birth to Yuri (유류; 儒留) and raised him without her husband.

As Yuri became older, he questioned Lady Ye about his father. She told Yuri that his father was not welcomed by Buyeo, thus went south and became the king of a newly founded state. She also said Chumo purposely hid an object under a pine tree supported by the rock with seven angles as a way for his son to certify his identity. After Yuri found a broken sword, Lady Ye came to Goguryeo with him in 19 BC.

== In popular culture ==
- Portrayed by Song Ji-hyo in the 2006–2007 MBC TV series Jumong.
