= Yuri of Goguryeo =

2nd King of Goguryeo (r. 19 AD – 18 BC)

Yurimyeong 유리명
- Taewang
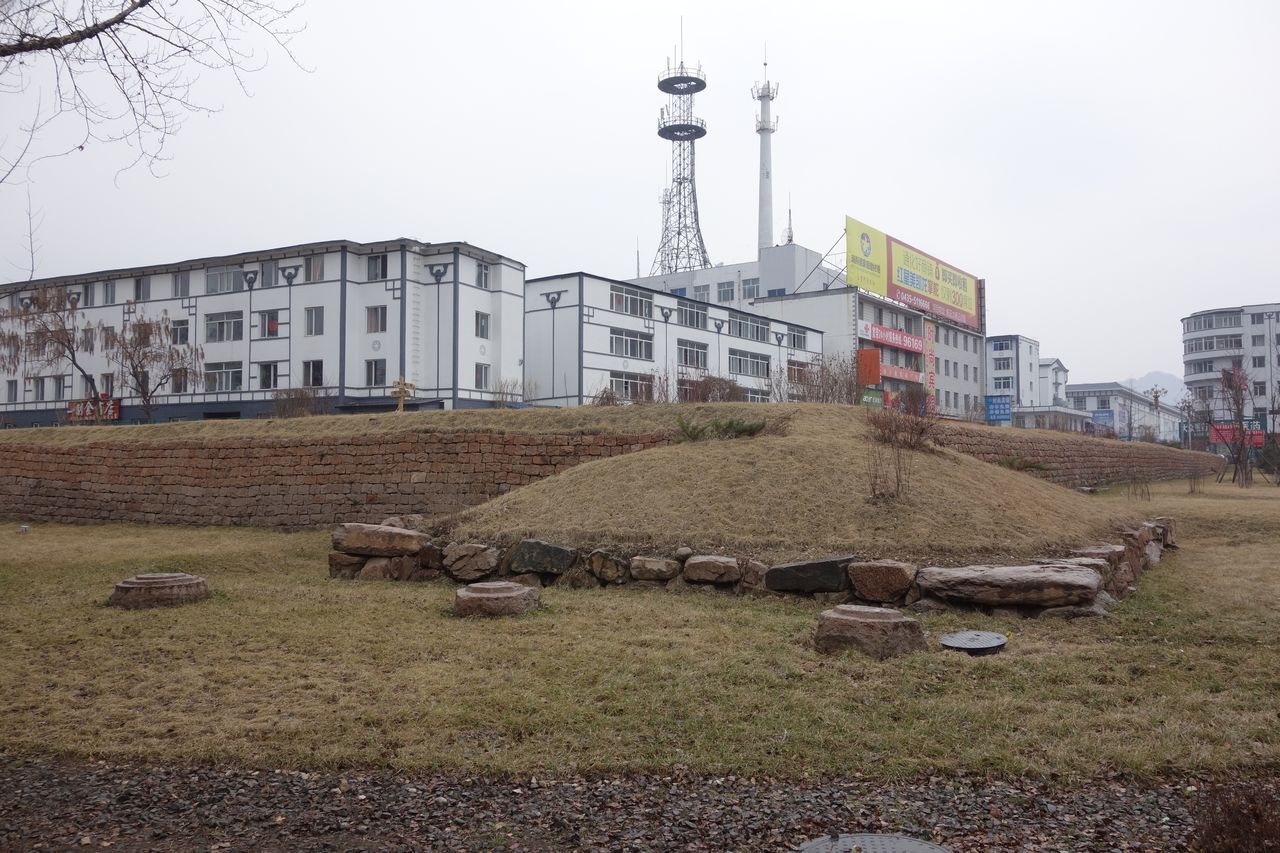
- Gungnae castle, presumed to have been built during the reign of King Yurimyeong

King of Goguryeo
- Reign: September 19 B.C. - October 18 A.D. (37 years)
- Coronation: September 19 B.C.
- Predecessor: Dongmyeong
- Successor: Daemusin

Crown Prince of Goguryeo
- Reign: ? B.C. - September 19 B.C.
- Coronation: September 19 B.C.
- Predecessor: First Crown Prince
- Successor: Dojeol
- Born: Yuri/Yuryu/Nuri/Yeodal/Yeohae; 38 B.C. Eastern Buyeo
- Died: 18 (aged 55–56); Dugog-ui igung, Goguryeo
- Burial: Dugog Dong-won
- Consort: Lady Song
- Spouse: Queen Song; Lady Hwahui; Lady Chihui
- Issue: Dojeol; Hae Myeong; Princess; Muhyul; Yeojin; Saekju; Jaesa
Regnal name
- Yuri Taewang; Yuryu Taewang
Posthumous name
- Yurimyeong Taewang
- House: Go
- Dynasty: Goguryeo
- Father: Dongmyeong
- Mother: Lady Ye

- Yuri of Goguryeo
- Hangul: 해유리; 유류; 누리
- Hanja: 解類利; 儒留; 累利
- RR: Hae Yuri; Yuryu; Nuri
- MR: Hae Yuri; Yuryu; Nuri

Monarch name
- Hangul: 유리왕; 유리명왕
- Hanja: 瑠璃王; 瑠璃明王
- RR: Yuriwang; Yurimyeongwang
- MR: Yuriwang; Yurimyŏngwang

King Yuri (Korean: 유리명왕 38 BC – 18 AD, r. 19 BC – 18 AD) was the second ruler of Goguryeo, the northernmost of the Three Kingdoms of Korea. He was the eldest son of the kingdom's founder Jumong. As with many other early Korean rulers, the events of his life are known largely from the Samguk sagi.

== Reign ==
Yuri is described as a powerful and militarily successful king. He conquered a Xianbei tribe in 9 BC with the help of Bu Bun-no. In 3 BC, Yuri moved the capital from Jolbon to Gungnae. The Han dynasty was overthrown by Wang Mang, who established the Xin dynasty. In 12 AD, Wang Mang sent a messenger to Goguryeo to ask for troops to assist in the conquest of the Xiongnu. Yuri rejected the request and instead attacked Xin.

He had six sons and among them were Haemyeong and Muhyul. Haemyeong was proclaimed the crown prince of Goguryeo after the death of Dojeol, who was King Yuri's eldest son. But Yuri found Haemyeong to be too reckless and disobedient. Yuri replaced him with the younger son Muhyul in 14 AD. Muhyul was Yuri's son with the daughter of Songyang. Muhyul ruled later as King Daemusin of Goguryeo.

A poem Yuri was said to have written for his favoured concubine Chihui has survived. It is titled the Song of the Yellow Bird.

== Succession ==
King Yuri died in 18 AD, after ruling for 37 years. He was succeeded by his youngest remaining son, Muhyul, who became King Daemusin.

== Family ==
- Father: King Dongmyeong of Goguryeo (동명성왕; 東明聖王; 58 BC - 19 BC)
  - Grandmother: Lady Ha Yuhwa (하유화; 河柳花; 89 BC - 24 BC)
  - Grandfather: Hae Mo-su (해모수; 解慕漱; b. 89 BC)
- Mother: Lady Ye (예씨 부인; 禮氏 夫人; b. 60 BC)
  - Grandfather: Ye Cheon (예천; d. 89 BC)
- Consorts and their respective issue(s):
1. Queen, of the Song clan (왕후 송씨; 王后 松氏; 33 BC – 17 AD); daughter of Song Yang, Marquis Damul (송양 다물후; 松讓 多勿侯; b. 77 BC).
  1. Prince Dojeol (도절, 都切; d. 1 AD)
  2. Prince Haemyeong (해명, 解明; 12 BC – 9 AD)
  3. Prince Muhyul (무휼, 無恤; 4 – 44 AD)
  4. Prince Yeojin (여진, 如津; 10 BC – 18 AD)
  5. Prince Saekju (색주, 色朱; d. 48 AD)
  6. Prince Jaesa (재사; 再思; d. 89 AD)
  7. Prince Yeoyul (여율; 如栗)
2. Lady Hwahui (화희; 禾姬; b. 33 BC)
3. Lady Chihui (치희; 雉姬; b. 10 BC)

== Theories regarding King Yuri ==
=== Usurpation theory and responses ===
Recently, some historians have interpreted historical evidence as indicating that Yuri may not have been the son of Jumong, but rather was a usurper. However, due to the lack of conclusive evidence either way, it is only speculation.

Yuri's surname was Hae (解), while Jumong's surname was Go (高). According to the Samguk sagi, Jumong is said to have been the son of Hae Mosu born in Buyeo. Later, Jumong is said to have fled Buyeo, leaving Yuri behind before he was born. Jumong may have changed his surname name from Hae to Go when he founded Goguryeo after leaving Buyeo, while Yuri kept the Hae surname. However, alternative theories suggest that their surnames are different because Yuri was a usurper from a different family, with the above story being created after the fact.

There is also record of one of Jumong's friends and most trusted subjects, Hyeob-bo, being dismissed by Yuri. According to the first Goguryeo volume of the Samguk sagi, Hyeob-bo disagreed with Yuri constantly leaving the palace to go on hunting trips, urging Yuri to focus on governance. Yuri, angered by this, then forced Hyub-bo(陜父) to resign from his office. Hyeob-bo subsequently left Goguryeo. This is interpreted by those suggesting usurpation as implying a removal of Jumong loyalists from Yuri's government. Not all of Jumong's subjects were removed. General Bu Bun-no(扶芬奴) and Oi served Goguryeo through most of King Yuri's reign and played active roles in the kingdom.

Another piece of evidence tied to the usurpation theory is the story of Jumong's broken sword. According to the Samguk sagi, Yuri found a piece of Jumong's broken sword and was appointed as crown prince when he showed it to Jumong. However, his possession of Jumong's broken sword is interpreted alternatively as evidence of victory over Jumong. Jumong also died very shortly after Yuri's arrival, at the relatively young age of 40.

=== Surname differences ===
Although the 2nd through 5th monarchs of Goguryeo kept the Hae surname, the sixth monarch Taejodae later adopted the Go surname again. To those that suspect Yuri usurped the throne, this is evidence of a restoration of the Go family line. However, another common hypothesis is that Goguryeo's royal surname was a word, and Hae (解) is a Chinese character transcription of the sound of that word in the Goguryeo language, and Go (高) is a Chinese character transcription of that word's meaning.

== Popular culture ==
- Portrayed by Ahn Yong-joon and Jung Yun-seok in the 2006–2007 MBC TV series Jumong.
- Portrayed by Jung Jin-young in the 2008–2009 KBS2 TV series The Kingdom of the Winds.
- Portrayed by Park Jung-woo in the 2010–2011 KBS1 TV series The King of Legend.

== See also ==
- History of Korea
- Three Kingdoms of Korea
- List of Korean monarchs

Yuri of Goguryeo House of Go Born: 38 BC Died: 18
Regnal titles
Preceded by Dongmyeong	King of Goguryeo; 19 BC – 18	Succeeded by Daemusin
