= Biryu =

Traditionally recognized founder of Baekje

- Hangul: 비류
- Hanja: 沸流
- Revised Romanization: Biryu
- McCune–Reischauer: Piryu

Biryu (?-?) was the second son of Jumong and So Seo-no, and older brother of Onjo, the traditionally recognized founder of Baekje (18 BCE–660 CE), which was one of the Three Kingdoms of Korea. In an alternate legend, Biryu himself is described as the founder of Baekje.

== The Record of Baekje Founding ==
The Korean history compilation Samguk Sagi presents two founding legends of Baekje, one crediting Onjo, and an alternate crediting Biryu. The Samguk Sagi relays only Onjo's descendants, not Biryu's, as the royal dynasty of Baekje. However, Biryu's descendants are thought to have maintained enough influence in Baekje for this legend to survive.

According to the main account given in the Samguk Sagi, Biryu settled in Michuhol, thought to be today's Incheon, South Korea. Onjo first settled north of the Han River, but later moved his capital to Hanam (meaning "south of the river") Wiryeseong (慰禮城) in or near today's Seoul. When the Michuhol land proved to be inhospitable, Biryu and his people went to Onjo, demanding that he be the King of Baekje. After Onjo refused, Biryu declared war and attacked Hanam, but failed to conquer it and committed suicide. Later, the two groups merged to become Baekje.

Biryu is also recorded in the Haedong goseungjeon (해동고승전; 海東高僧傳). A river and a statelet absorbed into Goguryeo shared his name. The 11th king Biryu and the 20th king Biyu of Baekje also apparently took their names from him.

== Popular culture ==
- Portrayed by Lee Jae Suk in the 2006 MBC TV series Jumong.
- Portrayed by Doo Soo in the 2010-2011 KBS1 TV series The King of Legend.
- Portrayed by Hong Jung Hyun in the 2017 KBS TV series Chronicles of Korea.
