= Dongmyeong of Goguryeo =

1st King of Goguryeo (r. 37–19 BC)

King of Goguryeo
- Reign: 37 BC – 19 BC
- Predecessor: Kingdom established
- Successor: Yuri of Goguryeo
- Born: 58 BC? Northern Buyeo
- Died: 19 BC? Jolbon, Goguryeo
- Burial: Ryŏkp'o Ward, Pyongyang, North Korea
- Spouse: Lady Ye; Soseono
- Issue: King Yuri, Biryu, King Onjo
- House: Ko
- Father: Hae Mo-su of Buyeo
- Mother: Lady Yuhwa

- Korean name
- Hangul: 추모; 고주몽
- Hanja: 鄒牟; 高朱蒙
- RR: Chumo; Go Jumong
- MR: Ch'umo; Ko Chumong

Posthumous name
- Hangul: 동명성왕
- Hanja: 東明聖王
- RR: Dongmyeongseongwang
- MR: Tongmyŏngsŏngwang

Dongmyeong of Goguryeo (Korean: 동명성왕; Hanja: 東明聖王), personal name Ko Chumong (고주몽; 高朱蒙), was the founding monarch of the kingdom of Goguryeo, and was worshipped as a god-king by the people of Goguryeo and Goryeo. King Dongmyeong was also an important figure for the kingdom of Baekje, as the father of its founding monarch, King Onjo.

== Names ==
Chumong, originally Buyeo slang for an excellent archer, was his personal name. (Note: The name is variously transcribed as "Ch'umo", "Chungmo", or "Tomo".) He was commonly recorded as Chumong (주몽; 朱蒙) by various Chinese sources, including history books written by Northern Qi and Tang. This name became dominant in future writings including the Samguk sagi and the Samguk yusa. At some point in time prior to the compilation of the Samguk sagi (1145), he was given the posthumous name of Dongmyeong (동명성왕; 東明聖王), literally translating to the Brilliant Saintly King of the East.

In the earliest Goguryeo sources, such as the Gwanggaeto Stele and Tomb Epitaph of Moduru, refer to Dongmyeong by his personal name, Ch'umo (추모; 鄒牟). Moduru's epitaph refers to Dongmyeong as King Ch'umo the Divine (추모성왕; 鄒牟聖王).

His other names include Ch'umong (추몽; 鄒蒙), (Note: From the Samguk yusa, only in one chapter.) Chungmo (중모; 中牟), (Note: In Silla.) Nakamu, (Note: In Nara Japan, the Korean pronunciation is "Chungmo" (중모; 仲牟).) or Tomo. (Note: In Heian Japan, the Korean pronunciation is "Tomo" (도모; 都慕).) In the Samguk sagi, he was recorded as Chumong with the surname Ko, and was also known as Chunghae (중해; 衆解) or Sanghae (상해; 象解).

== Life and myth ==
The records of Dongmyeong are often regarded as semi-legendary, and the extent to which the records are historical or mythological is debated. Much of the legend of King Dongmyeong of Goguryeo is appropriated from an earlier legend about the founding monarch of Buyeo, the similarly named King Dongmyeong of Buyeo. The origin myth of Buyeo's founding king was appropriated by Goguryeo monarchy in the 4th century AD to boost their own pedigree.

The founding myths of Goguryeo are told in ancient writings, including the Gwanggaeto Stele. The best-known versions of Chumo's life are found, with slight variations, in the Samguk sagi, Samguk yusa, and the "Dongmyeongwang" chapter (동명왕편; 東明王篇) of the Dongguk Yi Sangguk jip.

=== Birth ===
Hae Buru, the king of Buyeo, performed religious ceremonies in hope of having a son, as he was getting old without an heir. When he arrived at Gonyeon (or Gon Pond; 곤연; 鯤淵), he noticed his horse was shedding tears in front of a large rock. The king issued an ordered to remove the rock, and there he found a young boy who looked like a golden frog. The king treated the boy as a gift from heaven and named him Geumwa. (Note: Korean translation of golden frog is geumwa (금와). A frog is also used to metaphorically describe Buyeo and Goguryeo and is related to water. It can be phonetically translated as goma or gom (bear).) Hae Buru adopted Geumwa and made him the Crown Prince when he became older.

Later, Aranbul (아란불; 阿蘭弗), the minister of Buyeo, told Hae Buru that he received the messages from heaven. "Heaven will send its descendent and create a new kingdom above Buyeo, thus the king should resettle at Gaseopwon (가섭원; 迦葉原)," (Note: The words Aranbul and Gaseopwon are originally from Buddhism. Buddhism was state religion of Goryeo when the Samguk sagi was written.) a fertile land next to the ocean. Hae Buru and his followers relocated the capital and created a new kingdom called Eastern Buyeo. Meanwhile, in Buyeo, a person named Hae Mosu, proclaiming himself as the Son of Heaven, established the new capital at Buyeo.

After Hae Buru died, Geumwa became the next king of Eastern Buyeo. When he went to Wubalsu (or Wubal Pond; 우발수; 優渤水), which is located at the south of the mountain Taebaeksan, (Note: translation: the Great White Mountain) he met a woman named Lady Yuhwa, who was a daughter of Habaek. She told Geumwa that she was exiled by her father because she slept with Hae Mosu, who claimed to be the son of heaven, prior to marriage. She explained that Hae Mosu lured her to a place near the Yalu River, next to Ungsimsan (or Ungsim Mountain; 웅심산; 熊心山; lit. 'Bear Heart Mountain'). Geumwa thought her story was strange, so he locked her in a room. While Yuhwa was locked away, the sunlight followed her wherever she went, and she eventually became pregnant. After she gave a birth to a large egg, Geumwa gave the egg to dogs and pigs, but they refused to eat it. He then put the egg in the middle of the street, but cows and horses walked around it. The egg was also thrown on a field, but birds came to protect it. After multiple failed attempts to crack the egg, Geumwa returned the egg to Yuhwa. Later, a boy was born from the egg. The young boy learned how to craft a bow and arrows, and he became a master of archery by the age of 7, earning the nickname Chumong, a word used by the people of Buyeo to describe excellent archers.

=== Escaping Eastern Buyeo ===
Daeso, the eldest of the seven sons of Geumwa, was worried Dongmyeong would rise as a threat to him, but Geumwa commanded Dongmyeong to take care of the horses. While raising the horses, Dongmyeong intentionally gave more food to slow horses and gave less food to fast and talented horses to make them look unappealing and thin. When Geumwa went on a hunting trip with Dongmyeong and others, Dongmyeong was given a thin horse and fewer arrows, yet he was able to hunt more than anyone else who participated, since his thin horse was faster. This hunting episode further fueled Daeso's desire to kill Dongmyeong. Seeing the growing threat, Yuhwa asked Dongmyeong to leave and use his abilities elsewhere.

Dongmyeong and his three friends — Oi, Mari (마리; 摩離), and Hyeopbo (협보; 陜父) — escaped from Eastern Buyeo, followed by cavalry sent out by Daeso. Dongmyeong and his companions arrived to Eomsasu (or Eomsa River; 엄사수; 淹㴲水), but failed to find a bridge to cross the river. As the cavalry were approaching, Dongmyeong asked the river for help, declaring himself a son of the Heavenly God (천제; 天帝) and maternal grandchild of Habaek. (Note: 我是皇天之子, 母河伯女郎, 鄒牟王. 爲我連葭浮龜!) Answering Dongmyeong's call, fish and softshell turtles floated up from the river and created a bridge for Dongmyeong to cross, then disappeared by the time the pursuing troops arrived. (Note: In the Book of Wei, one of the oldest record of the myth, it is written "我是日子, 河伯外孫, 今日逃走, 追兵垂及, 如何得濟" describing relation to the Sun (日). Sun in Korean is 해 (Hae), and it is one of the oldest native Korean words.)

=== Founding of Goguryeo ===
After escaping death, Dongmyeong met three people, each wearing different cloths at Modungok (or Modun Valley; 모둔곡; 毛屯谷). Considering them as gifts from heaven, Dongmyeong gave a surname to each person: Jaesa, wearing hemp cloth, was named Geuk Jaesa (극재사; 克再思); Mugol, wearing monk cloth, was named Jungsil Mugol (중실무골; 仲室武骨); Mukgeo, wearing waterweed cloth, was named Sosil Mukgeo (소실묵거; 少室默居).This can be interpreted as the joining of three different groups, or as a meeting with three saints. Dongmyeong gave roles to everyone, and together they arrived at Jolboncheon (or Jolbon Stream; 홀본천; 忽本川).According to the history of Baekje, Dongmyeong arrived at Jolbon Buyeo (Korean: 졸본부여; Hanja: 卒本扶餘), married the second daughter of the king of Jolbon Buyeo, and had two sons from her. Dongmyeong wanted to build a palace on the mountain, but he wasn't able to afford it. Thus, he built a thatched house near Biryusu (or Biryu River; 비류수; 沸流水) and lived there. He named his newly founded nation Goguryeo, and he changed his surname to Ko at the age of 21 (37 BC). Hearing the news that a new nation was born, many people joined him.

=== Rule ===
In 37 BC, in the first year of his reign, Dongmyeong launched a preemptive strike on the Mohe near the border, fearing raids from them. The Mohe surrendered after the fight.

One day, Dongmyeong saw vegetable leaves floating on the Biryu River. He went hunting farther upstream and arrived at Biryuguk (or the Kingdom of Biryu; 비류국; 沸流國). Song Yang (송양; 松讓), the king of Biryu, saw Dongmyeong and commanded him to submit to Song's authority, since the State of Biryu was stronger and older. The two kings had an argument, then had an archery competition in which Dongmyeong was victorious. In June of 36 BC, Song Yang surrendered to Dongmyeong. Dongmyeong gave back Song Yang his old lands as a fief, renaming the land to Damuldo (or Damul City; 다물도; 多勿都), which meant "to give back old territory", and enfeoffing Song Yang as the Marquis of Damul (다물후; 多勿侯).

In July of 34 BC, the construction of walls and a palace was completed. In October of 32 BC, Dongmyeong sent Oi and Bu to Bunno (부분노; 扶芬奴), and conquered Haenginguk (or State of Haengin; 행인국; 荇人國), which is located southeast of Taebaek Mountain. In November of 18 BC, the king ordered Bu Wiyeom (부위염; 扶尉猒) to attack the Northern Okjeo (북옥저; 北沃沮), and Bu Wiyeom successfully made the Northern Okjeo submit to Goguryeo.

In August of 24 BC, Yuhwa died in Eastern Buyeo. A funeral was held, and a shrine was built to her as the dowager of Geumwa. In October, Dongmyeong sent an envoy along with regional products to Buyeo as a token of gratitude for the virtue and generosity shown by Geumwa.

In April of 19 BC, Dongmyeong's son, Yuri, and his mother fled from Buyeo, arriving at Goguryeo. Dongmyeong appointed Yuri as the crown prince of Goguryeo. In September, Dongmyeong, at the age of 39, mounted a dragon and ascended into Heaven and did not come back, according to the Gwanggaeto Stele. With only his whip left behind, it was buried at Yongsan (or Yong Mountain; 용산; 龍山; lit. 'Dragon Mountain') in the place of his body. In the 15th century Joseon dynasty text, Tongguk yŏji sŭngnam, the author would change Dongmyeong's mount from a dragon to an "unicorn horse". In the Samguk sagi, the Confucian Kim Pusik understood the legend of Dongmyeong's ascension to heaven as metaphorical not literal. He wrote that Dongmyeong died and was buried at Yongsan and was posthumously given the title Dongmyeong.

=== Comparison and controversies ===
Comparison between other myths and records
Nation	Character	Place of birth or discovery	Birth story	River crossing story	Founding location	Source
Buyeo	Dongmyeong of Buyeo	Gori or Takri (탁리; 橐離)	A maid (or concubine) claimed to be impregnated by a holy spirit. She gave birth to an egg. A king attempted to kill the boy, but was protected by animals.	The king became jealous of Dongmyeong's archery skill, so he attempted to kill Dongmyeong. Dongmyeong ran southward, arriving at Yieomsu (or Yieom River; 이엄수; 施掩水). He shot an arrow into the river with a bow, then the fish and softshell turtles created a bridge for him to cross. His pursuers were forced to return.	Dongmyeong arrived at Buyeo and became the king.	Records of the Three Kingdoms; Lunheng
Baekje	Dongmeyong of Buyeo	Saekri (색리; 索離) or Goryeo (Note: Also can be pronounced as Gori.)	A maid (or concubine) claimed to be impregnated by a holy spirit. She gave birth to an egg. A king attempted to kill the boy, but was protected by animals.	The king became jealous of Dongmyeong's archery skill, so attempted to kill him. Dongmyeong ran southward, arrived at Eomchesu (or Eomche River) (엄체수; 淹滯水). He shot an arrow into the river with a bow, then fish and softshell turtles created a bridge for him to cross.	Dongmyeong arrived to Buyeo and became the king.	History of the Northern Dynasties; Book of Sui
Goguryeo	Chumo	Northern Buyeo	Chumo was son of Heaven and Lady Habaek (daughter of river god). He was born from an egg.	He was ordered to go (presumably by his mother) and arrived at Eomridaesu (or the Great Eomri River) (엄리대수; 奄利大水) of Buyeo. He issued a command to the river, then reeds and turtles made a bridge for him.	He arrived at Holbon in Biryugok (or Biryu Valley), and built the capital on the mountain.	Gwanggaeto Stele
Goguryeo	Jumong	Buyeo	The daughter of Habaek was impregnated by sunlight. She gave birth to an egg. The king attempted to crack the egg, but it was protected by animals. A boy was born from the egg.	The people of Buyeo became jealous of Jumong's archery skill, and his mother insisted that he run away. Jumong ran southeastward with two companions, and arrived at the river. He issued a command to the river, then fish and softshell turtles created a bridge for him to cross. His pursuers were forced to return.	Jumong arrived to Bosulsu (or Bosul river; 보술수; 普述水) and found three people each wearing a different outfit. Jumong and his followers established Goguryeo at Heulseunggolseong (or Heulseunggol Castle; 흘승골성; 紇升骨城), and he changed surname to Go.	Book of Wei
Goguryeo/Tang	Dongmyeong of Buyeo				Dongmyeong, compelled by Spirit, crossed Sacheon (or Sa Stream; 사천; 㴲川), and established the nation.	Tombstone of Yeon Namsan, the third son of Yeon Gaesomun.
Goguryeo/Tang	Jumong				Jumong, embracing the Sun, arrived at Paesu (or Pae River) (패수; 浿水), and built the capital.	Tombstone of Yeon Namsan, the third son of Yeon Gaesomun.
Silla	Hyeokgeose	Najeong (or Na Well) (나정; 蘿井)	Sobyeoldori saw a horse sitting and crying between some trees. When he approached, the horse disappeared but left behind an egg. He cracked the egg, and found Hyeokgeose.			
Samguk sagi	Geumwa	Gonyeon (or Gon Pond)	Hae Buru went to the pond, then his horse shed tears in front of the rock. He removed the rock and found Geumwa.	Geumwa's son Daeso sent out cavalry to pursue Jumong.		Samguk sagi
Samguk sagi	Jumong as Dongmyeong-Seongwang	Eastern Buyeo	Yuhwa, who had slept with Hae Mosu, was then impregnated by sunlight and gave birth to an egg. Geumwa attempted to crack the egg, but it was protected by animals. A boy was born from the egg.	Geumwa's son Daeso became jealous of Jumong. Jumong ran southward, arriving at Eomsasu (or Eomsa River; 엄사수; 淹㴲水). Jumong prayed to the river, declaring his divine authority, then fish and softshell turtles made a bridge for him. His pursuers were forced to return.	Jumong arrived to Jolboncheon (or Jolbon Stream), but could not afford to build a palace. Thus, he lived in a thatched house next to next to Biryusu (or Biryu River; 비류수; 沸流水) and created Goguryeo. He changed his surname to Go.	Samguk sagi

By noting the similarities in these myths, we can presume the following:

- The legend of Dongmyeong was shared among kingdoms with Buyeo origins — Buyeo, Goguryeo, and Baekje — with variations.
- There seems to have been an ancient kingdom located north of Buyeo which existed before the creation of Buyeo.
- Dongmyeong and Chumong were considered as separate entities by Goguryeo; however, the legend was mixed together before the reign of Jangsu. Many Buyeo and Goguryeo royals intermarried after the birth of the kingdom of Goguryeo and appear to have mixed naturally or purposely to claim legitimacy and subjugate Buyeo.
- Eastern Buyeo was created after the invasion of Xian Bei. Many people ran to North Okjeo and founded Eastern Buyeo rather than returning to Buyeo. (Note: Samguk sagi often confused Buyeo and Eastern Buyeo. Also the movement of people and troops is only described as being north and south, not west and east.) The addition of Eastern Buyeo to the myth appears to have occurred in the process of Goguryeo claiming legitimacy and subjugating Eastern Buyeo, or was added during the unified Silla or Goryeo period. (Note: This could have been added during the era of Yeon Gaesomun, whose family originated in Eastern Buyeo. The Yeon family often associated themselves with water.)
- The description of the Book of Wei has the most similarities with the story written in Samguk sagi. The myth was complete, with the exception of the stories related to Eastern Buyeo, by the time when the Book of Wei was written.
- By the time Samguk sagi was written, Dongmyeong and Chumong were considered the same person. The story of Geumwa also seems to be influenced by Heokgeose of Silla.

== Alternative story ==
There is an alternative story of Dongmyeong, which was noted by the compilers of Samguk sagi. The following description is based on Samguk sagi.

Both Biryu (비류; 沸流) and Onjo (온조; 溫祚) were sons of Wu Tae (우태; 優台), the illegitimate grandson of Hae Buru, and Soseono (소서노; 召西奴), the daughter of Holbon native Yeon Tabal (연타발; 延陀勃). Unfortunately, Soseono became a widow after Wu Tae died. When Dongmyeong arrived at Holbon, he established Goguryeo and married Soseono.

Soseono supported Dongmyeong in every way possible, paving the way for the future of the Kingdom of Goguryeo, while Dongmyeong helped raise her sons as if they were his own children. However, everything eventually turned against Soseono after Yuri, the only biological son of Dongmyeong from Lady Ye, came to Goguryeo and was appointed as the crowned prince. Biryu was displeased by the decision since Yuri had not contributed at all to the creation of the kingdom. Also, fearing a purge by Yuri after Dongmyeong's death, Biryu led his followers along with Onjo and Soseono, and left Goguryeo to create his own kingdom.

== Records by people of Goguryeo ==
There are only a handful of records from Goguryeo still remaining today as many have been lost throughout the centuries. According to the records, Dongmyeong was born in Northern Buyeo. He arrived to Holbon (홀본; 忽本), and built the capital on the mountain located west of Holbon. After he became tired of the throne, he went to the hill east of Holbon and died there.

== Other records ==
According to the Notes on History of the Three Kingdoms, in previous books written by Chinese dynasties, there are huge discrepancies in the history of Goguryeo, as they treated Old Goguryeo (고고구려; 古高句麗) and the New Goguryeo (신고구려; 新高句麗) as the same entity, while separating Sosu Maek (소수맥; 小水爲) and the events involving Eastern Okjeo. The Old Goguryeo was occupied by the Han Dynasty shortly after the fall of Gojoseon, and became one of the counties under the Xuantu Commandery in 107 BC. On the other hand, the New Goguryeo was founded by Dongmyeong. In 82 BC, New Goguryeo launched an attack on the Commanderies of Han, and was responsible for driving out the Xuantu Commandery from its original location to an area northwest of Goguryeo. (Note: 漢初, 燕亡人衛滿王朝鮮, 時沃沮皆屬焉. 漢武帝 元封二年, [集解4] 伐朝鮮, 殺滿孫右渠, 分其地爲四郡, [集解5] 以沃沮城爲玄菟郡. [集解6] 後爲夷貊所侵, 徙郡句麗西北, 今所謂玄菟故府是也. [集解7] 沃沮還屬樂浪. 漢以土地廣遠, 在單單大領之東, 分置東部都尉, [集解8] 治不耐城, [集解9] 別主領東七縣, 時沃沮亦皆爲縣. [集解10] — [集解7] 丁謙曰, 徙治古高句驪西北, 在昭帝五年, 正朱蒙開國後, 攘斥邊境, 沃沮與濊貊, 爲所役屬時, 傳云, 爲夷貊所侵, 實卽高句驪也.) Based on this account, Dongmyeong was old enough to command his military force by 82 BC, which directly challenges the records from Samguk sagi.

However, there are indications that Goguryeo was actually older than 705 years based on other records.

- Tombstone of Go Ja recognized the history of Goguryeo as 708 years old. (indicating a founding date of 42 BC)
- Silla recognized the history of Goguryeo as 800 years old in 670 AD. (indicating a founding date around 130 BC)
- Tang recognized the history of Goguryeo as 900 years old in 668 AD. (indicating a founding date around 232 BC)

According to Gwanggaeto Stele, Gwanggaeto the Great was the 17th generation (世孫) after Dongmyeong, while Samguk sagi recorded him as the 13th generation after Dongmyeong. There are two analyses of this:

- Gwanggaeto the Great was the 17th generation after Dongmyeong.
- Gwanggaeto the Great was the 17th generation after Daejuryu.

These other sources suggests there may be significant gaps or issues in the timeline of Goguryeo found in the Samguk sagi.

== Legacy ==
The Kingdom of Goguryeo eventually evolved into a great regional territory with considerable power and influence. Goguryeo existed for 705 years and was ruled by 28 consecutive monarchs of the Go Dynasty until the collapse of the central government by the Silla-Tang alliance in 668. Both Balhae and Goryeo succeeded Goguryeo, and the modern descendants of Dongmyeong still bear his family name of "Ko."

In Goguryeo, Dongmyeong was deified as an ancestral deity and he was worshipped throughout the centuries.

Today, Korea's Hoengseong Ko clan, China's Gao clan of Liaoyang clan (Hanzi:遼陽 高氏) and Japan's Koma clan consider him their founder.

== In popular culture ==
From May 2006 to March 2007, MBC aired an 81-episode drama, Jumong, to mark the network's anniversary. The series took elements from historical records and mythology, and retold the story in a more down-to-earth manner than found in the myths, recounting how Jumong, the spoiled stepchild of the Buyeo royal family, embarks on a journey of self-discovery, becoming a leading figure of Buyeo, but retreats from Buyeo after his step-brothers' betrayal. Relaunching the armed and militarily capable guerrilla fighters' force his biological father Hae Mo-su once headed, Jumong goes on a life mission to rescue and band together the refugees of the ancient Joseon peoples, leading the fight against the oppression of Imperial China, finally establishing himself as the king of the new nation Goguryeo.

From 2010 to 2011, KBS1 aired King Geunchogo, also known as The King of Legend. In this series, Jumong is portrayed as a tyrant who could not accept sharing the power over Goguryeo with Soseono and the Jolbon faction. After Yuri of Goguryeo's arrival, the declared crown prince and successor to Jumong's throne, Soseono and all her subordinates and servants decided to leave "their beloved Goguryeo" to establish a new kingdom "much more powerful than Goguryeo ever was."

Since 2017, KCTV aired 고주몽, a historical animation directed by Kim Kyung-ho at the SEK Studio. The animation contains the contents of Jumong, when he brings small countries of the same family together and builds up Goguryeo into a powerful nation. It deals with the history from the time when the parents Hae Mo-su and Yuhwa established their family until the birth of Jumong. In the first ten parts, Jumong tells the story of Buyeo, where he was born, and escaped. The first episode was broadcast on January 1, 2017, and so far 24 episodes have been broadcast. South Korean netizens were surprised at the quality development of the North Korean animation.

=== Actors who have played King Dongmyeong ===
- Portrayed by Song Il-kook in the 2006–2007 MBC TV series Jumong.
- Portrayed by Lee Deok-hwa in the 2010–2011 KBS1 TV series The King of Legend.
- Portrayed by Jo Jang-ho in the 2017 KBS TV series Chronicles of Korea.

== See also ==
- List of monarchs of Korea
- History of Korea
- Three Kingdoms of Korea

== Sources ==
- MET "List of Rulers of Korea". The MET Museum.
- KOCIS Lim, Felix (2014-09-04). "Jumong: founder of Goguryeo Kingdom is man of legend, history". Korean Culture and Information Service.
- CEFIA "Korea's Representative Myths: Stories of State-Founding Kings". CEFIA, Toward Globalization of Korean Studies. June 2022.
- RKS Kim Chang-seok (2004-12-01). "Goguryeo Society and Its Economy" (PDF). The Review of Korean Studies. 7 (4): 35–56.

Dongmyeong of Goguryeo House of Ko Born: 58 BC Died: 19 BC
Regnal titles
New creation	King of Goguryeo; 37 BC – 19 BC	Succeeded by Yuri
