= Cholbon =

First capital of Goguryeo

- Hangul: 졸본
- Hanja: 卒本
- RR: Jolbon
- MR: Cholbon

Other names
- Hangul: 홀본; 흘승골성
- Hanja: 忽本; 紇升骨城
- RR: Holbon; Heulseunggolseong
- MR: Holbon; Hŭlsŭnggolsŏng

Cholbon (Korean: 졸본; Hanja: 卒本) was the first capital of Goguryeo, which arose in the north of the Korean Peninsula. Cholbon is thought to have been in modern Wunü Mountain, Liaoning province of China. Cholbon was also known by the names of Heulseunggol-seong in the Book of Wei and Holbon in the Gwanggaeto Stele.

In 37 BC, Jumong had fled from Dongbuyeo to avoid death at the hands of Dongbuyeo's Crown Prince Daeso, who presented great jealousy towards Jumong. After he fled, Jumong established a new kingdom in 37 BC called Goguryeo in the Holbon region. In Jolbon, he married Soseono (or So Seo-no), who was the daughter of a local tribal leader.

Cholbon was the first capital city of the ancient Korean Kingdom of Goguryeo from 37 BC – 3 AD. The second ruler, the son of Jumong, Yuri, moved its capital to Gungnae Fortress.

== See also ==
- Buyeo kingdom
- Goguryeo
- King Dongmyeong of Goguryeo
- Soseono
