= Prince Hodong and the Princess of Nakrang =

Korean legend about love and treason

- Hangul: 호동왕자와 낙랑공주 (S) 호동왕자와 락랑공주 (N)
- Hanja: 好童王子와 樂浪公主
- Revised Romanization: Hodong wangja wa Nangnang gongju
- McCune–Reischauer: Hodong wangja wa Rangnang gongju

The Korean legend of Prince Hodong and the Princess of Nakrang is the story of a Princess who betrays her own country for the love of a Prince of the enemy country. This story is set during the reign of Daemusin of Goguryeo (AD 18-44), first mentioned in the Samguk Sagi (삼국사기). It records that Nakrang had a sacred drum and trumpet that sounded by themselves in case of foreign invasion called the Jamyunggo. To invade Nakrang, King Daemusin ordered his son, Prince Hodong, to deceive the Princess of Nakrang into tearing apart the mystical drum and flute, resulting in the fall of Nakrang. This tale of warring nations, love, betrayal, and death and has been the topic of many dramatizations and philosophical comments.

== Plot ==
=== Prince Hodong ===
The Prince Hodong of Goguryeo was the son of King Daemusin of Goguryeo and his second Queen, the granddaughter of the Kalsa Kingdom. He was a favorite of King Daemusin due to his good looks and intelligence. Despite the favor of the King, his path to the throne was uncertain since the first Queen also had a son, Haeu, who was around 15 years younger than him. Because of the lack of power from his maternal side, he knew he had to accomplish something big to become king. At the time, Goguryeo was in the middle of expanding their land. Their southern neighbor country, Nakrang, was in a better geographic location for farming and fishing, which was crucial for their growing population. Although Goguyeo was tremendously stronger in military power, Nakrang's Jamyunggo was a great concern for King Daemusin. This was a huge opportunity to prove himself if Prince Hodong could defeat Nakrang.

=== Princess of Nakrang ===
The Princess of Nakrang was the daughter of the King of Nakrang Choi Ri (Lelang). Nakrang owned a mythical drum and flute, Jamyunggo, that played themselves when an enemy approached, which served as a heavenly protector for the country. Neighbor countries were afraid to attack for fear of going against the heavens.

=== The Marriage of Prince Hodong and Princess Nakrang ===
In April of 32 AD (15th year of King Daemusin's reign) Prince Hodong was hunting at Okjeo when the King of Nakrang found him. The Prince was hunting near the border of Nakrang to explore and analyze the enemy land. When King Choi Ri saw him, he took interest in his looks and asked: "By looking at your appearance, you don't seem to be common folk. Are you the prince of the northern country (Goguryeo)?" When Prince Hodong replied yes, the King of Nakrang invited him back to his country for a feast. The King was aware that the expanding Goguryeo was a brutal country with a base of strong military power and feared they would be the next target. To form an alliance with Goguryeo, he planned for the Prince to marry his daughter, the Princess of Nakrang. The Princess fell in love with the prince at first sight but the prince had other intentions in mind. The marriage of Prince Hodong and the Princess of Nakrang quickly proceeded. After the marriage, Prince Hodong went back to Goguryeo and sent a letter to the Princess of Nakrang stating:

"I am the prince of Goguryeo. If you destroy the mythical drum and the flute of your country then I will accept you as my wife. However, if you do not accept my favor we cannot be together."

The Princess was torn when she heard the Prince's request. Although the love that she had for the Prince was overbearing, she faced the dilemma of betraying her own country. After much consideration, the Princess decided to destroy the Jamyunggo for Prince Hodong. As soon as they got the signal it was destroyed, the troops of Goguryeo attacked their way into Nakrang. Because the Jamyunggo did not ring, the King of Nakrang was not aware of the attack until the enemy troops reached the palace. When found out that his daughter destroyed the Jamyunggo, he had to kill her because she had committed treason. The King of Nakrang then ended up surrendering to Goguryeo, which led to the fall of Nakrang Kingdom.

== The Samguk Sagi ==
The first extant account of the story of Princess Nakrang and Prince Hodong was in the Samguk Sagi (삼국사기). The Samguk Sagi, Chronicles of the Three Kingdoms (Goguryeo, Baekje and Silla), was published in 1145. The author, Kim Pusik, published this compilation to address the growing disconnection between the history and the people. He stated:

Of today's scholars and high-ranking officials, there are those who are well-versed and can discuss in detail the Five Classics 五經 and the other philosophical treatises...as well as the histories of Qin and Han, but as to the events of our country, they are utterly ignorant from beginning to end. This is truly lamentable.

Around 600 AD, each of the Three Kingdoms had produced their own records: Sogi (Records, circa 370, Baekje), Kuksa(National History, 545, Silla) and Sinjip (600, Goguryeo). However, these records were lost during the continual wars and invasions between the Kingdoms throughout the centuries. It is unclear how much of these records Kim Pusik was able to incorporate when he wrote his chronicles. Also, the chronicles were compiled to illustrate a stricter Confucian doctrine, intended as a keystone to order family relationships and govern the state.

Therefore, it is not clear if this legend of a Jamyunggo (자명고), i.e., of a Self-beating drum, was a part of the former Goguryeo's Sinjip, or some "original research" added by Kim Pusik to illustrate the Confucian influence.

== Other narratives ==
This Korean counterpart of the Romeo and Juliet story has been largely used nowadays as a source of inspiration by various artists and essayists. Varia Among them:

- 1956: Film directed by Kim So-dong, Prince Hodong and Princess Nangnang (호동왕자와 낙랑공주). Starring: Kim Dong-won, Jo Mi-ryeong, Kim Seung-ho
- 1962: Film directed by Han Hyeong-mo, Prince Hodong (왕자호동). Starring: Kim Jin-kyu, Um Aing-ran
- 1988: Ballet choreographied by Lim Sung-nam, Prince Hodong
- 2009: Drama series, written by Jeong Seong-hee, directed by Lee Myung-woo, Ja Myung Go. Starring: Jung Ryeo-won, Jung Kyung-ho, Park Min-young

== Nakrang Kingdom versus Lelang Commandery ==
The Korean Nakrang (낙랑) can either refer to:

- 낙랑군, 樂浪郡, the Lelang Commandery of Chinese Han Dynasty that existed from BC 108 to AD 313, centered around the city of Wanggeom-seong 왕검성 (modern-day Pyeongyang).
- 낙랑국, 樂浪國, a Kingdom of Nakrang, that temporary existed in the same area as the result of a rebellion against the Han administration. It was found in AD 29 after eleven years of insurrection against the Lelang and destroyed AD 37 by Goguryeo. This motive was elaborated upon is mostly by Jeong Seong-hee for the SBS series.
