= Ja Myung Go =

South Korean television series

- Promotion Poster
- Also known as: Princess Ja-myung
- Hangul: 자명고
- Hanja: 自鳴鼓
- RR: Jamyeonggo
- MR: Chamyŏnggo
- Genre: Historical; Romance
- Written by: Jung Sung-hee
- Directed by: Myoungwoo Lee
- Starring: Jung Ryeo-won; Jung Kyung-ho; Park Min-young
- Music by: Lee Pil-ho
- Country of origin: South Korea
- Original language: Korean
- No. of episodes: 39

Production
- Executive producers: Heo Woong; Jeong Young-chul (CP)
- Producers: Bae Tae-seop; Hee Han-ho
- Production location: South Korea
- Running time: 65-70 minutes
- Production company: Da.da Creative Group

Original release
- Network: SBS TV
- Release: March 9 – July 21, 2009

Ja Myung Go (Korean: 자명고; RR: Jamyeonggo; also known as Princess Ja-myung) is a 2009 South Korean television series starring Jung Ryeo-won, Park Min-young and Jung Kyung-ho. It aired on SBS from 9 March to 21 July 2009 on Mondays and Tuesdays at 21:55 (KST) for 39 episodes.

It is based on the Korean folk tale Prince Hodong and the Princess of Nakrang, which touches the story of the failed Nakrang Kingdom. According to the tale, there was a famous drum called the jamyeonggo, literally "the drum that beats by itself," that possessed the mysterious power to automatically sound an alarm whenever enemies would invade its kingdom. The self-sounding drum caused neighboring nations, including the warrior state of Goguryeo, to hesitate about attacking Nakrang. A prince of Goguryeo named Hodong infiltrated Nakrang with the mission of destroying the drum. But the prince unexpectedly fell in love with the princess of Nakrang. For her love, the princess eventually chose to tear off the drum to betray her country. As a result, her nation fell into ruin and she was killed. Prince Hodong mourned over her death, holding her body.

The period drama series, however, gives a new twist in that the drum is in fact a person, embodied by Ja-myung, the hidden sister of the Nakrang Kingdom's princess. Growing up as the princess of Nakrang, Ra-hee is adored by her people, while Ja-myung survives a murder attempt and lives as a commoner. Prince Hodong, from Nakrang's enemy, the Goguryeo Kingdom, is torn between two nations and two women, and must make a choice between love and duty.

Ja Myung Go received low ratings in the single digits (it competed in the same timeslot as hits Queen of Housewives and Queen Seondeok), resulting in SBS cutting short the initial planned 50 episodes to 39.

== Plot ==
Ja-myung (Jung Ryeo-won) and Ra-hee (Park Min-young) were born on the same hour on the same day as half sisters. An oracle warns that one of two would save the Kingdom and the other would destroy it. Ja-myung survives an assassination attempt by her stepmother Wang Ja-shil (Lee Mi-sook), the ambitious mother of Ra-hee. She escapes to Shandong Province, and grows up a commoner, becoming a top artist. When she discovers her true identity, she returns to the royal court. To avoid renewed conflict over the right to the throne, Ja-myung stays at the shrine as a priestess. She creates the Ja-myunggo-gak system, where a magic war drum is placed, to defend the country from outside attacks. Ja-myung and Prince Hodong (Jung Kyung-ho) of the enemy state of Goguryeo fall in love, but Hodong, as an ambitious prince, marries Ja-myung's half sister, Princess Ra-hee, to manipulate her into destroying the nation's defense system. Ra-hee, who is also in love with Hodong, eventually chose to tear down her country's war drum, becoming the traitor - and the princess of the prophecy. Princess Ja-myung, struggling to save her nation, pierces her beloved Hodong with her sword. He barely escapes death, but he realizes their fate; they cannot be together. As approaching soldiers come, he holds Ja Myung close to him and slides a sword through both of their bodies.

Among the many locations described in the series, there are:

- Lelang Commandery, later Nakrang Kingdom, especially Wanggeomseong, the capital
- Goguryeo, especially Guknaeseong, the capital
- various places at the border, especially the Eunpo fortress and the Cheongcheon River
- Shantung Peninsula, especially Mokjidun (Happy Joy's theater basis) and Dongmohyeon (Liu Ling's den).
- Luoyang, capital of the Eastern Han Empire.

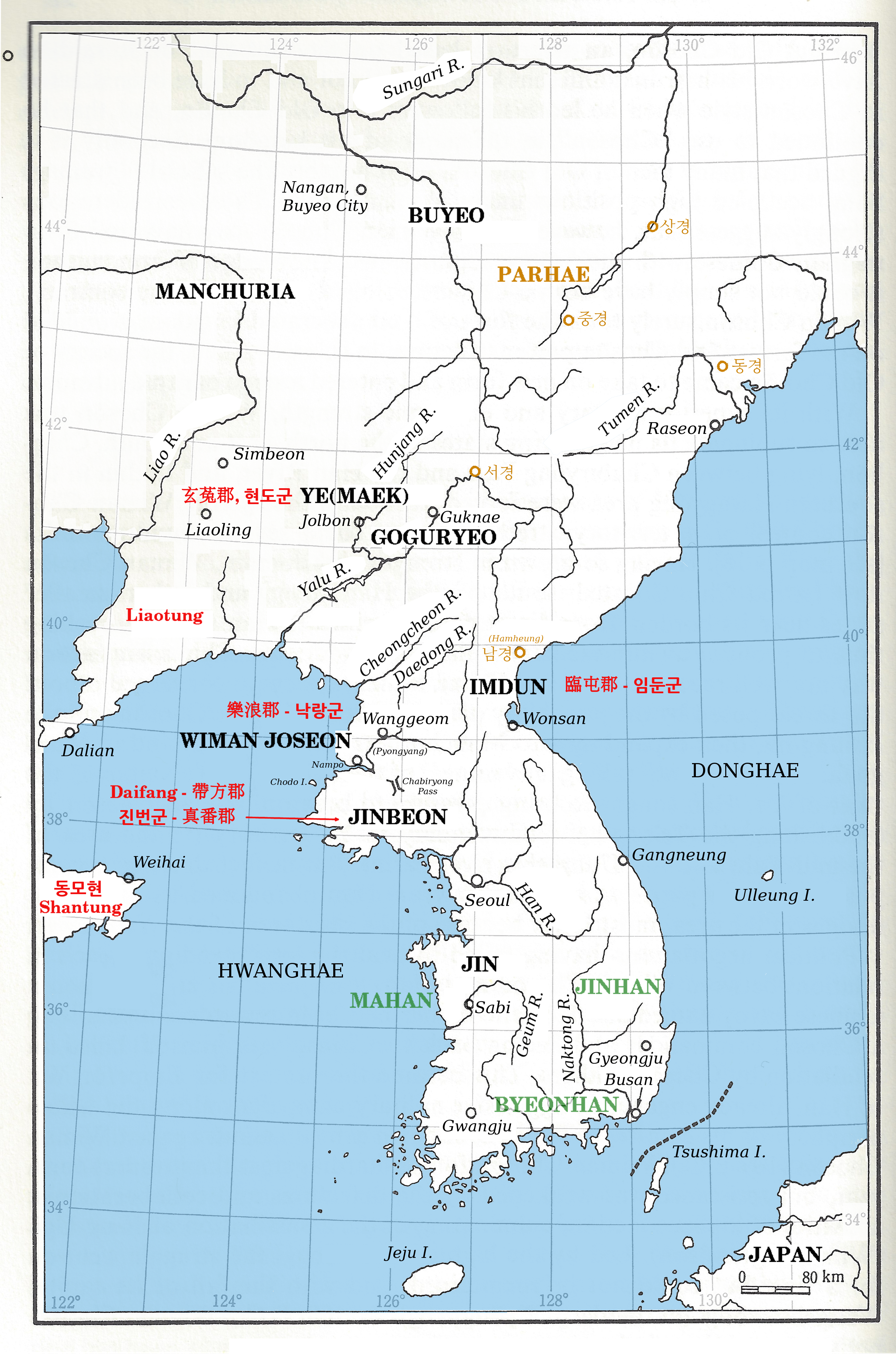
Lelang/Nakrang and around

== Cast ==
=== Main cast ===
- Jung Ryeo-won as Princess Ja-myung/Puku: Daughter of Mo Ha-so
  - Lee Young-yoo as child Ja-myung
- Jung Kyung-ho as Prince Hodong: Son of Daemusin and Arang of Buyeo
  - Yeo Jin-goo as teenage Hodong
  - Kang Soo-han as child Hodong
- Park Min-young as Princess Ra-hee: Princess of Nakrang, daughter of Wang Ja-shil
  - Jin Ji-hee as child Ra-hee
- Lee Mi-sook as Wang Ja-shil: Ra-hee's mother, Wang Goeng's sister, Choi Ri's second wife
- Sung Hyun-ah as Song Maeseolsu: Goguryeo's queen, Daemusin's second wife, from Biryuna tribe
- Kim Sung-ryung as Mo Ha-so: Ja-myung's mother, Choi Ri's first wife
- Hong Yo-seob as Choi Ri: Commander of Nakrang, Ja-myung and Ra-hee's father, former Lelang left-jungrangjang
- Moon Sung-keun as Daemusin: Third king of Goguryeo, born Muhyul

=== Extended cast ===
- Lee Joo-hyeon as Wang Hol: Great general of Nakrang, younger brother of Wang Goeng and Wang Ja-shil
  - Park Gun-woo as young Wang Hol
- Yeo Uk-hwan as Il-poom/Haengkai: Son of Dal Gebi from Dongmohyeon
  - Yoon Chan as child Il-poom
- Go Soo-hee as Mo Yang-hye: Wang Goeng's wife
- Lee Won-jong as Cha Cha-sung: Leader of the Happy Joy theater
- Jo Mi-ryung as Mi-choo: Cha Cha-sung's wife
- Park Hyo-joo as Chi-so: Wang Ja-shil's maid
- Lee Han-wi as Woo Na-roo: Hodong's uncle, Yeo-rang's husband, great general of Goguryeo
- Yoon Joo-sang as Song Ok-goo: Chief of Biryuna, father of Song Maeseolsu
- Lee Yeong-beom as Eul Doo-ji: Hodong's mentor and jwabo (Left State Councilor)
- Yoon Seo-hyeon as Tae Chul: Hodong's bodyguard
- Kim Ga-yeon as Yeo-rang: Daemusin's sister, Hodong's aunt, Woo Na-roo's wife
- Hwang Geum-hee (Note: Credited as Ji Sung-won.) as Dong Go-bi: Mo Ha-so's maid
- Jo Kyeong-hoon as Ho-gok: Lelang inquisitor, tattooed as "son of a pig", and Ja-myung's master of arms
- ? as Yang Deok: Song Maeseolsu's lady-in-waiting
- Kim Hak-cheol as Boo Dal: Wang Goeng's batman.
- Park Bong-seo as Ryoo-ji: Soldier of the Choi Ri's company, later seungsang (highest minister)
- Park Jung-woo as Choo Bal-so: Administrator of Goguryeo southern sector
- Na Han-il as Wang Goeng: Leader of the Korean insurrection. Former Lelang right-jungrangjang.
- Ahn Suk-hwan as Ja-mook: Lelang's astrologue
- Park Hyeon-seo (백현서) as Song Sujiryoon: Song Maeseolsu's cousin. interesting fact that currently no information about her.
- Kang Ye-sol as So-so: Child of the Happy Joy theater
  - Moon Ga-young as teen So-so
  - Park Ha-yeong as child So-so
- ? as Hadeok: Goguryeo's chief eunuch
- Park Kyeong-hwan as Boo Toong: Son of Boo Dal
- ? as Do Soo-gi: Son of Do Chal
- Jang Doo-yi as Do Chal: Wang Goeng's soldier
- Lee Chang-jik as Yoo Heon (Liu Xian): Lelang viceroy
- Lee Jang-won as Yoo Reung (Liu Ling): Minister of Rites of Emperor Guangwu of Han. Nephew of Liu Xian.
- Jang Ji-yu as priestess
- ? as Ha Ho-gae: Choi Ri's batman
- ? as Cheol Sang: Officer of the Jolbon Fortress
- ? as Oh Bu-gwi: Lelang's Prime Minister
- Park A-rong as Sool-yi: Song Maeseolsu's maid
- ? as Ah-mi: Song Maeseolsu's maid
- Ji Il-joo as Jeom So-yi: Leader of the Xianbei, Simbeon tribe
- ? as Jeo-nom: Chief of the inlet at Daedong's mouth
- Kim Hyung-mook as Song Gang: Eldest son of Song Ok-goo
- ? as Ta Ho-tae: Leader of Yeonna tribe
- Oh Eun-chan as Hae Ae-woo: Daemusin and Song Maeseolsu's son, Ho-dong's brother
- Yoo Kyung-ah as Dal Ge-bi: Dong Go-bi's sister, Il-poom's mother (episode 2)
- Kim So-hyun as Myo-ri (episode 13)
- ? as Mae-go: Ho-dong's maid who reports to Song Maesolsu (episodes 1 and 6)
- ? as Tak-chi: First lieutenant of Boo Dal
- ? as Yoo Su (Liu Xiu): Emperor Guangwu of Later Han

== Ratings ==
Date	Episode	Nationwide	Seoul
2009-03-09	Special	5.8	8.3
2009-03-10	1	4.1	8.5
2009-03-16	2	7.7	8.7
2009-03-17	3	10.0 (15th)	10.9 (12th)
2009-03-23	4	9.4 (19th)	9.5 (17th)
2009-03-24	5	9.6 (20th)	9.7 (19th)
2009-03-30	6	9.1 (19th)	9.4 (14th)
2009-03-31	7	9.5 (18th)	10.1 (15th)
2009-04-06	8	11.5 (10th)	11.5 (10th)
2008-04-07	9	11.2 (8th)	11.2 (9th)
2009-04-13	10	9.8 (13th)	9.7 (14th)
2009-04-14	11	10.0 (15th)	10.1 (11th)
2009-04-20	12	9.9 (11th)	10.2 (11th)
2009-04-21	13	10.8 (12th)	10.8 (12th)
2009-04-27	14	9.4 (14th)	9.8 (13th)
2009-04-28	15	10.3 (13th)	10.5 (13th)
2009-05-04	16	9.4 (15th)	9.5 (15th)
2009-05-05	17	9.3 (17th)	9.7 (19th)
2009-05-11	18	8.5 (20th)	8.3 (20th)
2009-05-12	19	8.5 (17th)	8.7 (16th)
2009-05-18	20	8.2 (18th)	8.7 (15th)
2009-05-19	21	8.1 (19th)	8.1 (18th)
2009-05-25	22	10.4 (9th)	10.7 (8th)
2009-05-26	23	9.3 (17th)	9.7 (15th)
2009-06-01	24	8.5	8.5 (17th)
2009-06-02	25	8.3	8.5 (20th)
2009-06-08	26	8.2	8.6 (17th)
2009-06-09	27	8.0	8.4
2009-06-15	28	7.5	8.1
2009-06-16	29	8.7 (16th)	8.7 (16th)
2009-06-22	30	7.3	7.5
2009-06-23	31	7.4	7.7
2009-06-29	32	6.5	8.4
2009-06-30	33	7.2	8.1
2009-07-06	34	6.8	8.0
2009-07-07	35	7.0	8.2
2009-07-13	36	5.9	8.7
2009-07-14	37	6.5	9.2
2009-07-20	38	6.8	8.4
2009-07-21	39	7.2	7.7
Average		8.5%	-

== International broadcast ==
Thailand: It aired on Channel 3, starting 12 December 2009.
