= Emperor of the Sea =

South Korean television series

- Title card of the series
- Also known as: Sea God or Hae-sin
- Hangul: 해신
- Hanja: 海神
- Lit.: Sea God
- RR: Haesin
- MR: Haesin
- Genre: epic; Period drama
- Based on: Hae-sin by Choi In-ho
- Written by: Jung Jin-ok; Hwang Joo-ha
- Directed by: Kang Il-soo; Kang Byung-taek
- Starring: Choi Soo-jong; Chae Shi-ra; Song Il-kook; Soo Ae; Chae Jung-an
- Music by: Lee Pil-ho
- Country of origin: South Korea
- No. of episodes: 51

Production
- Executive producer: Lee Duk-gun (KBS)
- Producers: Kim Ho-joon; Joo Seon
- Production company: Kim Jong-hak Production

Original release
- Network: KBS2
- Release: November 24, 2004 – May 25, 2005

Emperor of the Sea (Korean: 해신; lit. 'Sea God') is a South Korean period drama and epic television series starring Choi Soo-jong, Chae Shi-ra, Song Il-kook, Soo Ae, and Chae Jung-an. It aired on KBS2 from November 24, 2004, to May 25, 2005, on Wednesdays and Thursdays at 21:55, spanning 51 episodes. The series is based on Choi In-ho's 2003 novel Hae-sin, which depicts the life of Jang Bogo, who rises from a lowly slave to a powerful maritime figure dominating East Asian seas and international trade during the Unified Silla dynasty.

The series was highly successful, holding the number one spot in ratings for the majority of the weeks it aired. The series was exported to eight countries, earning approximately US$1.8 million in profits.

The filming set in Wando County, South Jeolla Province became a popular tourist attraction.

== Plot ==
Jang Bogo (Choi Soo-jong) rises from a lowly slave to become the military commander of the seas during the Unified Silla dynasty. Along the way, he battles pirates and engages in a heated rivalry with Madam Jami (Chae Shi-ra), a Silla noble who challenges Jang Bogo for control of trade rights in the South Sea. Yeom Jang (Song Il-kook), Jang Bogo's charismatic comrade, supports him in his rise to power and eventual title as the "Emperor of the Sea." However, Yeom Jang also competes with Jang Bogo for the affections of Lady Jung-hwa (Soo Ae).

== Cast ==
- Choi Soo-jong as Jang Bogo / Gungbok
  - Baek Sung-hyun as young Gungbok

Jang Bogo is a historical figure who dominated the seas of East Asia—hence the names "Sea God" or "Emperor of the Sea"—and international trade routes from Tang China and Japan to the Yellow Sea during the Unified Silla dynasty.
Gungbok begins life in the lowest social class as a slave on the docks of Cheonghae. He loses his mother to pirates at a young age, and his father works as a slave carpenter in the local Police Office. Through hard work at the docks, Gungbok masters the sea and gains skill in shipbuilding. As he faces challenges, he becomes calmer and bolder. Both Gungbok and his mate Nyeon study martial arts under Choi Moo-chang. These abilities help him rise from gladiator to security guard, then to military head of Muryongun, and eventually ambassador of Cheonghae. He eliminates pirates by establishing Cheonghaejin on Wando, a strategically important sea route. Using clever battle strategies, he defeats the army led by Madam Jami and reinstates the legitimate ruler of Korea. Despite repeated requests from the king, he refuses high positions. After the king is assassinated by the scheming Kim Yang, Jang Bogo prepares his army for a final assault to remove corrupt ministers appointed by Kim Yang.
In the end, Consul Jang Bogo is fatally stabbed in his office by Yeom Jang. He accepts his death without resistance, and his body is discovered at midnight by Nyeon, Choi Moo-chang, and Jung-hwa. Even after his death, his army fights to the last man in his honor.

- Chae Shi-ra as Madam Jami

A Silla noblewoman and business magnate. She initially influences Lady Jung-hwa's destiny. However, her grudges against Jang Bogo lead to her downfall, and her life ends in tragedy.

- Song Il-kook as Yeom Jang / Yeom Moon
  - Hong Hyun-ki as young Yeom Moon

Raised by pirates, young Yeom Moon wields short knives with remarkable skill and precision. He is later captured by Jang Bogo and punished as a pirate, receiving a burn mark on his forehead. Released by Kim Yang, he trains Kim Yang's men in martial arts and leads assaults against Madam Jami's forces, temporarily reconciling with Jang Bogo. Later appointed head of the king's bodyguards, he attempts to prevent Jang Bogo from attacking the corrupt ministers, promising to spare Jung-hwa and her child. Ultimately, he betrays Jang Bogo and kills him. Shocked by subsequent events, including Kim Yang's attack on Silla, Yeom Jang escapes imprisonment, helps Jung-hwa flee with Jang Bogo's child, and is eventually killed by arrows from Kim Yang's army.

- Soo Ae as Jung-hwa
  - Lee Yeon-hee as young Jung-hwa

The love interest of both Jang Bogo and Yeom Jang. Her name alone can provoke Jang Bogo to act impulsively, abandoning his usual careful consideration and acting with reckless determination.

=== Extended cast ===
- Kim Heung-soo as Jung Nyeon
  - Ahn Jae-hong as young Jung Nyeon
- Park Yeong-gyu as Seol-pyeong
- Chae Jung-an as Lady Chae-ryeong
- Kim Ah-joong as Baek Ha-jin
- Lee Won-jong as Choi Moo-chang
- Kim Kap-soo as Lee Do-hyeong
- Jo Dal-hwan as Lee Soon-jong
  - Heo In-beom as young Soon-jong
- Jung Sung-hwan as Chang-kyeom (Jung-hwa's brother)
- Lee Hee-do as Mak Bong (Soon-jong's father)
- Kang Sung-pil as Jong Dal
- Jung Ho-keun as Dae Chi
- Park Jung-hak as Neung Chang
- Go Do-young as Da Bok
  - Lee Eun-hye as young Da Bok
- Kil Yong-woo as King Shinmu
- Seo Do-young as Moo Jin (Jung-hwa's bodyguard)
- Choi Sang-gil as Cheon Tae
- Kim Hyo-won as Yoo Ja-seong
- Lee Jae-yong as Master Jo Sang-gil
- Kim Hyung-bum as Tae-bong (Jami's security officer)
- Do Ki-suk as Jang Seong-pil
- Bae Soo-bin as Kim Yang
- Go Myung-hwan as Pan Sool (one of Master Yi's men)
- Yeo Ho-min as Baek Kyung (Yeom Jang's subordinate)
- Park In-hwan as Bogo's father (Eps. 1–2)
- Seo Jin-wook
- Bae Seul-ki
- Lee Ji-eun
- Seo Bum-yul
- Jo Seung-yeon
- Kim Byung-gi
- Song Ji-eun
- Seo Bum-shik
- Baek So-mi
- Kim Sung-hoon
- Shim Eun-kyung

== Ratings ==
The series was a major success, achieving viewer ratings between 28.5% and 30.0%.

== Awards and nominations ==
2005 International Emmy Awards

- Drama series in the Asia, Africa and Middle East region - Final Round Nomination

2005 KBS Drama Awards

- Top Excellence Award, Actor: Choi Soo-jong
- Excellence Award, Actress: Soo Ae
- Excellence Award, Actor: Song Il-gook
- Popularity Award, Actor: Song Il-gook
- Best Couple Award: Song Il-gook and Soo Ae

2006 1st Seoul International Drama Awards

- Best Cinematographer: Kim Seung-hwan
- Best Series and Feature Film Award

== See also ==
- List of Korean television shows
- Contemporary culture of South Korea
- History of Korea
- Unified Silla
