= Chang Pogo =

Korean admiral (787–841)

- Hangul: 장보고
- Hanja: 張保皐
- RR: Jang Bogo
- MR: Chang Pogo

Alternate name
- Hangul: 궁복
- Hanja: 弓福
- RR: Gungbok
- MR: Kungbok

Chang Pogo (Korean: 장보고; Hanja: 張保皐; 787–841), whose childhood name was Kungbok or Kungp'a (궁파), was a Sillan who rose to prominence in the Later Silla period of Korea as a powerful maritime figure who effectively controlled the Yellow Sea (West Sea), and dominated the trade between Silla, Heian Japan, and Tang China for decades. His impressive fleet of ships was centered in Wando, an island in South Jeolla Province. So influential a figure did Chang become in late Silla politics that he was granted official office as maritime commissioner of the Cheonghaejin Garrison on Wando and came close to marrying his daughter into the Silla Royal House before his assassination in 841. He was worshipped as a god in China, Korea, Japan, and Vietnam following his death.

== Early years ==
Chang Pogo was born as the son of a boatman and his childhood name was Kungbok. Kungbok means a good archer, and he excelled in martial arts and swam well from his youth. Kungbok, being of lowly origins, learned that he could not become a general in Silla, so he moved to Tang Dynasty and joined the army and changed his name to Chang Pogo. Later, on learning that the Silla people were suffering from pirates, Chang Pogo returned to Silla.

The three sources for his life are the Chinese New Book of Tang (Xīn Tángshū), the Japanese Shoku Nihon Kōki (続日本後紀), and the Korean 12th-century Samguk sagi ("A History of the Three Kingdoms"), which contains a brief biography of Chang compiled three centuries after his death. The biography relates that Chang Pogo was adept in martial arts and claims that Chang's companion Jeong Yeon (정년; 鄭年) could swim five li (about 2.5 km) underwater, without taking a breath. The history further records that as young men the two companions, Chang Pogo and Jeong Yeon, traveled to Tang China. Their skills in horsemanship and the handling of spears soon won them military office. They were both named Junior Generals of Wuning District (武寧軍小將) (in what is today Jiangsu province).

== Rise to power ==
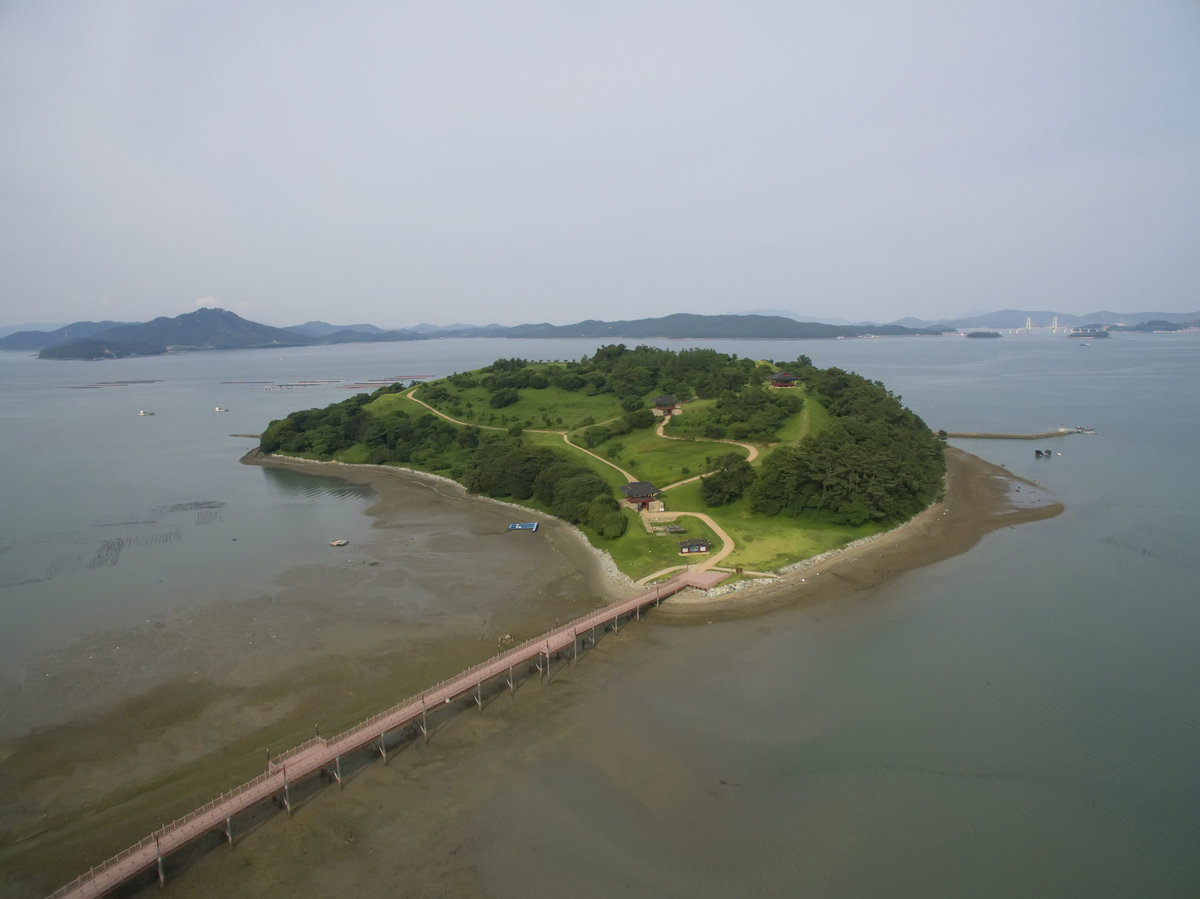
Cheonghaejin jangdo

By the ninth century thousands of Silla subjects were living in Tang, centered mostly around merchant activities in coastal Shandong and Jiangsu provinces, where they established their own Silla communities often led by Silla officials. Wealthy benefactors (including at one point Chang Pogo himself) even established Silla Buddhist temples in the region, as related by the 9th-century Japanese monk Ennin, whose journal constitutes one of the rare sources on Chang Pogo.

Apparently, while in China, Chang Pogo had become incensed at the treatment of his fellow countrymen, who in the unstable milieu of late Tang often fell victim to coastal pirates or inland bandits. In fact, Silla subjects living in Tang had become a favored target of bandits, who sold their captives into slavery. In 823 the Tang emperor went so far as to issue an edict stopping the slave trade and ordering the return of all abducted Koreans to Silla. Shortly after returning to Silla around 825, and by now in possession of a formidable private fleet headquartered at Cheonghae (Wando), Chang Pogo petitioned the Silla king Heungdeok (r. 826-836) to establish a permanent maritime garrison to protect Silla merchant activities in the Yellow Sea. Heungdeok agreed and in 828 formally established the Cheonghae (淸海, "clear sea") Garrison at what is today Wando island off Korea's South Jeolla province. The Samguk sagi further relates that Heungdeok gave Chang an army of 10,000 men to establish and man the defensive works. The remnants of Cheonghae Garrison can still be seen on Jang islet just off Wando's southern coast.

The establishment of Cheonghae garrison marked the apex of Chang's career. From that moment he can be viewed in the context of the numerous private warlords arising outside the Silla capital who were often backed by formidable private armies. Chang's force, though nominally bequeathed by the Silla king, was effectively under his own control. Chang became arbiter of Yellow Sea commerce and navigation. Another rare account of Chang and his garrison comes from the journal of the Japanese monk Ennin (Jikaku), who in 840 made a pilgrimage to Tang in search of Buddhist scriptures and relied upon the maritime abilities of Chang to reach China and return. The best evidence of Chang's now high fortunes is his involvement in the volatile factional politics of the Silla court.

== Political influence ==
At the time, Chang Pogo's backing by his own army gave him immense power in politics. Militarily, he was powerful enough to overthrow the state and become king himself had he wanted to. He was often hated by the Silla royal family members due to his prominent status and the fact that he was born a commoner, not a nobleman.

In 839, Chang proved instrumental in the seizure of power by King Sinmu following the overthrow of King Minae. Kim Ujing (later King Sinmu) approached Chang for help in taking the throne from the usurper who had killed Ujing's father. Chang is purported to have replied, "The ancients had a saying, 'To see what is right and not to do it is want of courage.' Though I am without ability, I shall follow your orders." Thereupon Chang dispatched a force of 5000 men under the command of his closest companion and adviser Jeong Yeon (who had since also returned from Tang) in support of Sinmu's claim. The success of Sinmu's power grab won Chang Pogo the post of Prime Minister.

== Death ==
The account of Chang Pogo's demise comes from the Samguk sagi. Chang overplayed his hand when he maneuvered to marry his daughter to King Munseong (ruled 839-857), son of Sinmu. Aristocratic factions at court, no doubt fed up with the machinations of Chang (a man in all likelihood from obscure provincial origins outside Silla's aristocratic order), then plotted to have him killed. The Samguk yusa, a late 13th century Korean book that mixes history and tales of marvels and popular legend, relates that the Silla king was pressured by aristocrats to deny Chang his marriage and that as a result Chang began to conspire against the king. Whether it was the Silla king or the aristocracy that was behind Chang's assassination is unclear.

Both the Samguk sagi and Samguk yusa relate that in 846 Chang was assassinated at his Cheonghae garrison headquarters by Yŏm Chang, an emissary from the Silla court who had arrived concealing a knife in his garments. Gaining Chang's confidence by pretending he had fled from the Silla capital, he attacked Chang as they shared wine. However, the Japanese history book, Shoku Nihon Kōki (續日本後紀, 869) (Later Chronicle of Japan, Continued), gives Chang's date of death as 841.

Furthermore, Ennin's Diary, Nitto Guho Junrei Koki, a contemporary record, notes that in July 845, the 'former Cavalry Commander of Cheonghaejin' fled to China due to a national crisis. This provides cross-validation and contextual alignment that makes the 841 theory far more convincing. Consequently, even The New History of Korea, published by the National History Compilation Committee of the Republic of Korea, also dates Chang Pogo’s death to the year 841.

In 851 the Cheonghae garrison was disbanded and its troops dispersed. The location of Chang Pogo's burial spot remains unknown.

== In Korean shamanism and mythology ==
Chang Pogo was worshipped as a god after his death, especially on the small island of Jangdo. The shamanistic temple on the island worships 'Great General Song'; however, according to the islanders, 'Great General Song' is a title of Chang Pogo.

There is a myth about Chang Pogo ('General Chang') and 'General Ŏm', Chang Pogo's son-in-law, retold in the region.

General Ŏm, who was General Chang 's son-in-law, lived in the Ŏmnamut Valley. One day, he and General Chang had a contest; who could first raise a flag on that eastern crag? Chang Pogo transformed into a male pheasant and flew to the crag, but General Eom turned into a falcon and killed and ate General Chang in the form of a pheasant. Thus, the crag is still called Kattturiyeo (male pheasant crag)

== Family ==
- Father - Chang Paekik (장백익; 張伯翼)
- Wife - Lady Pak (박씨; 朴氏)
- Issue
  - Daughter - Chang Ŭijŏng (장의영; 張義英)
  - Daughter - Chang Hyeyŏng (장혜영; 張惠英)
    - Son-in-law - Kim Sŏnghae (김성해; 金成海) of the Gimhae Kim clan
      - Grandson - Kim Chŏngch'ŏl (김정철; 金挺喆)

On an episode of the TV series Finding Your Roots, it was revealed that one of David Chang's paternal ancestors was Chang Pogo.

== Cultural references ==
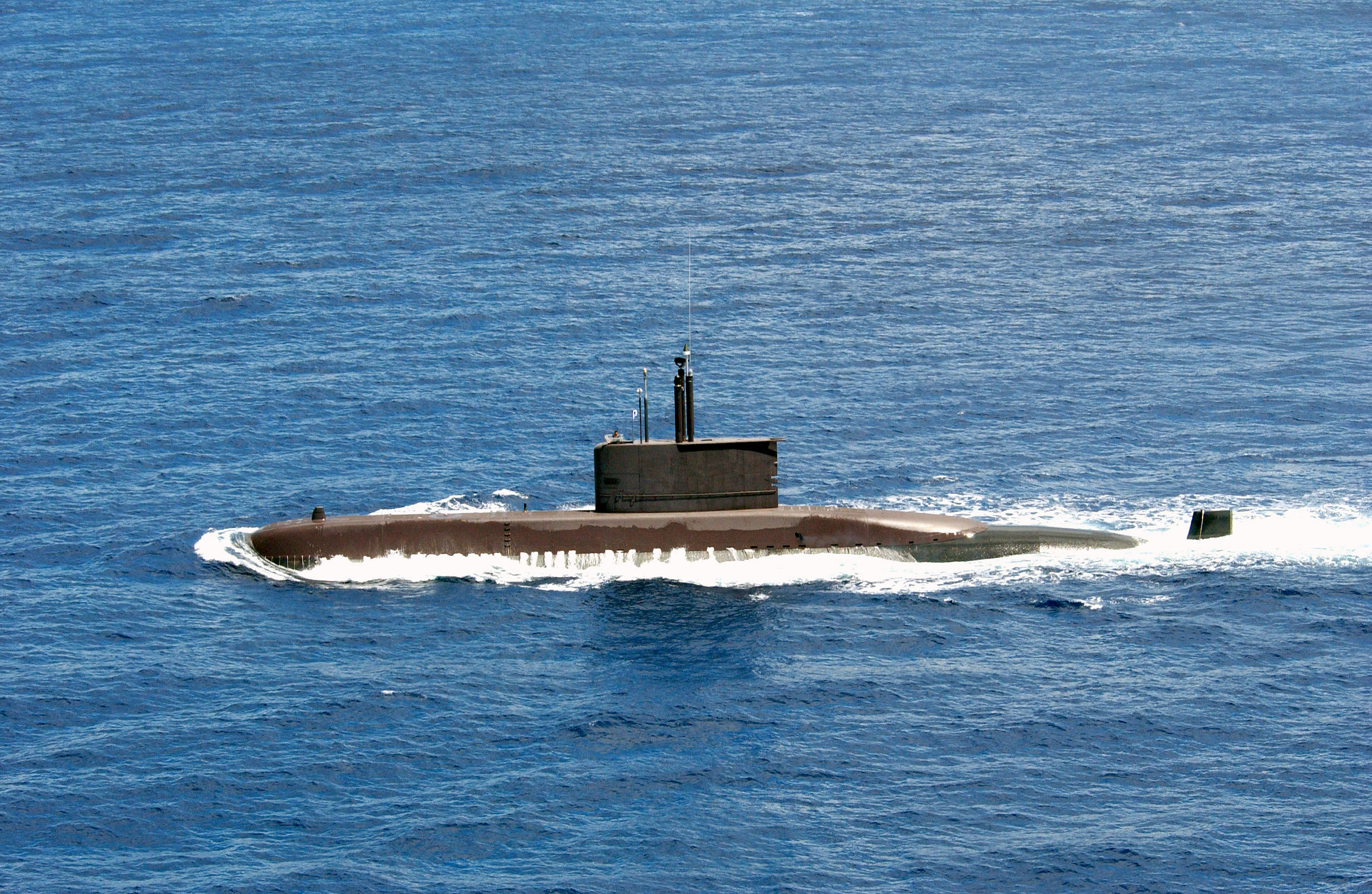
Jang Bogo-class submarine

- Chang Pogo and his exploits were the subject of the 1965 South Korean film, Jang Bogo, directed by Ahn Hyeon-cheol and starring Shin Yeong-gyun and Lee Min-ja. Its English title is Admiral Jang.
- The South Korean navy named the first of its Type 209 submarines 'Admiral Chang Bogo' in Chang's honor.
- A highly fictionalized account of Chang's life was the subject of the 2004 Korean drama Emperor of the Sea, starring Choi Soo-jong as Chang Pogo.
- In March 2009, the Cheonghae Anti-piracy Unit was formed by the Republic of Korea Navy to combat piracy off the coast of Somalia. The unit is named after Cheonghaejin, the maritime base created by Jang Bogo to combat piracy on the waters of Silla and Tang.
- In Shenyang, a memorial dedicated to Chang Pogo opened in 2007.
- On an episode of the TV series Finding Your Roots, it was revealed that one of David Chang's paternal ancestors was Jang Bogo.

== In popular culture ==
- Portrayed by Choi Soo-jong and Baek Sung-hyun in the 2004–2005 KBS2 TV series Emperor of the Sea.
- On a 2022 episode of the TV series Finding Your Roots, it was revealed that one of American restaurateur and TV personality David Chang's paternal ancestors was Jang Bogo.

== See also ==
- Yŏm Chang
- Jang Bogo-class submarine
- Jang Bogo Station
- Cheonghaejin
