= Land of Wind =

Land of Wind may refer to:

- The Land of Wind, a 2008 South Korean drama
- The Land of Wind, a nation in the fictional universe of the ninja manga, Naruto
