= Cheonghaejin =

Silla-era settlement in South Korea

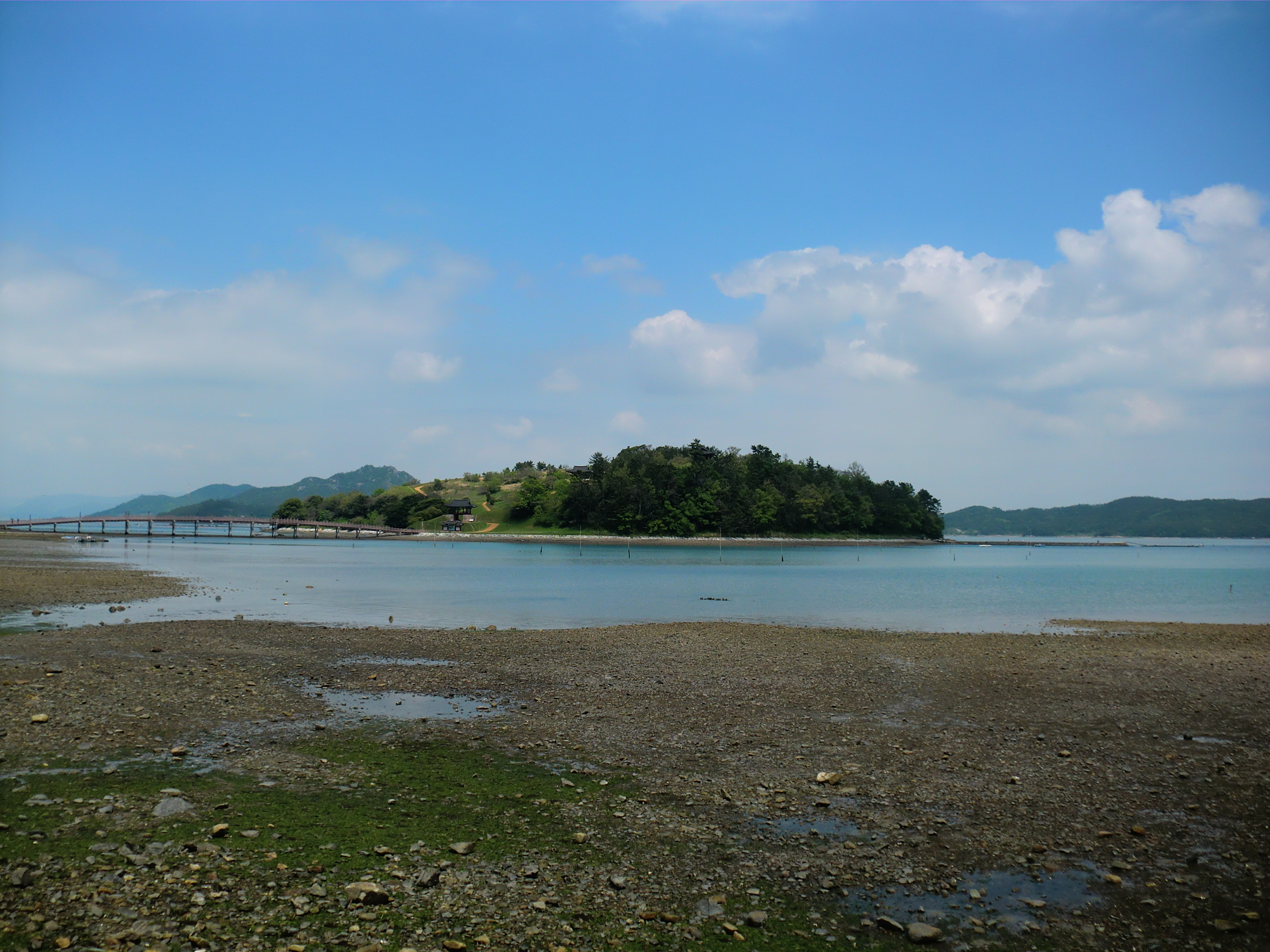
- The site (2015)
- Interactive map of Cheonghaejin
- 34°21′34″N 126°44′13″E

Historic Sites of South Korea
- Official name: Historic Site of Cheonghaejin Fort, Wando
- Designated: 1984-09-01
- Reference no.: 308

Korean name
- Hangul: 청해진
- Hanja: 淸海鎭
- RR: Cheonghaejin
- MR: Ch'ŏnghaejin

Cheonghaejin (Korean: 청해진; Hanja: 淸海鎭; lit. 'Clear sea headquarters') was a major military headquarters and trading hub located on Wando island, South Jeolla province of South Korea, and established by Korean general Chang Pogo in 828 during the Silla kingdom period. It traded mainly with Tang dynasty China and Japan, and served as a military hub to combat various pirate factions.

== History ==
Cheonghaejin was established originally as a military complex by General Chang Pogo in 828, the third year of King Heungdeok's reign. Chang appealed to Heungdeok to establish a military complex in Cheonghaejin to protect Silla's merchant fleets and coastal residents from pirates. He was granted permission and 10,000 troops. He established a small castle and a military base in Garipo.

Cheonghaejin was very successful in its mission; it maintained strong commercial ties with Chinese and Japanese trading ports and successfully protected Silla merchants and coastal residents from pirates. Chang sent envoys called Hoyeoksa (호역사) for trading activities and cultural exchange.

It was resented by many Silla noblemen of small maritime societies because they lost their profits from private maritime trades. The noblemen of Silla sent an assassin, Yŏm Chang, to assassinate Chang. After Chang's assassination, the complex was maintained by Yŏm Chang himself, but the residents of Cheonghaejin, mourning Chang's death, left Cheonghaejin. They mostly moved to other regions of Silla, while some moved to China or Japan. It is recorded in Samguk Sagi that the central Silla government closed Cheongjaejin in February 851. The remaining residents were then relocated to Byeokgolgun.

== Modern times ==
Cheonghaejin is now located in Wando County, Jeollanam-do, and is a main tourist location in the region. There is a stele commemorating the relocation of residents of Cheongjaejin to Byeokgolgun and various remains of the complex. Remains of various mercantile products and plates have been discovered in Cheongjaejin, which greatly contributed to understanding the life of Silla people.

== Historical site ==
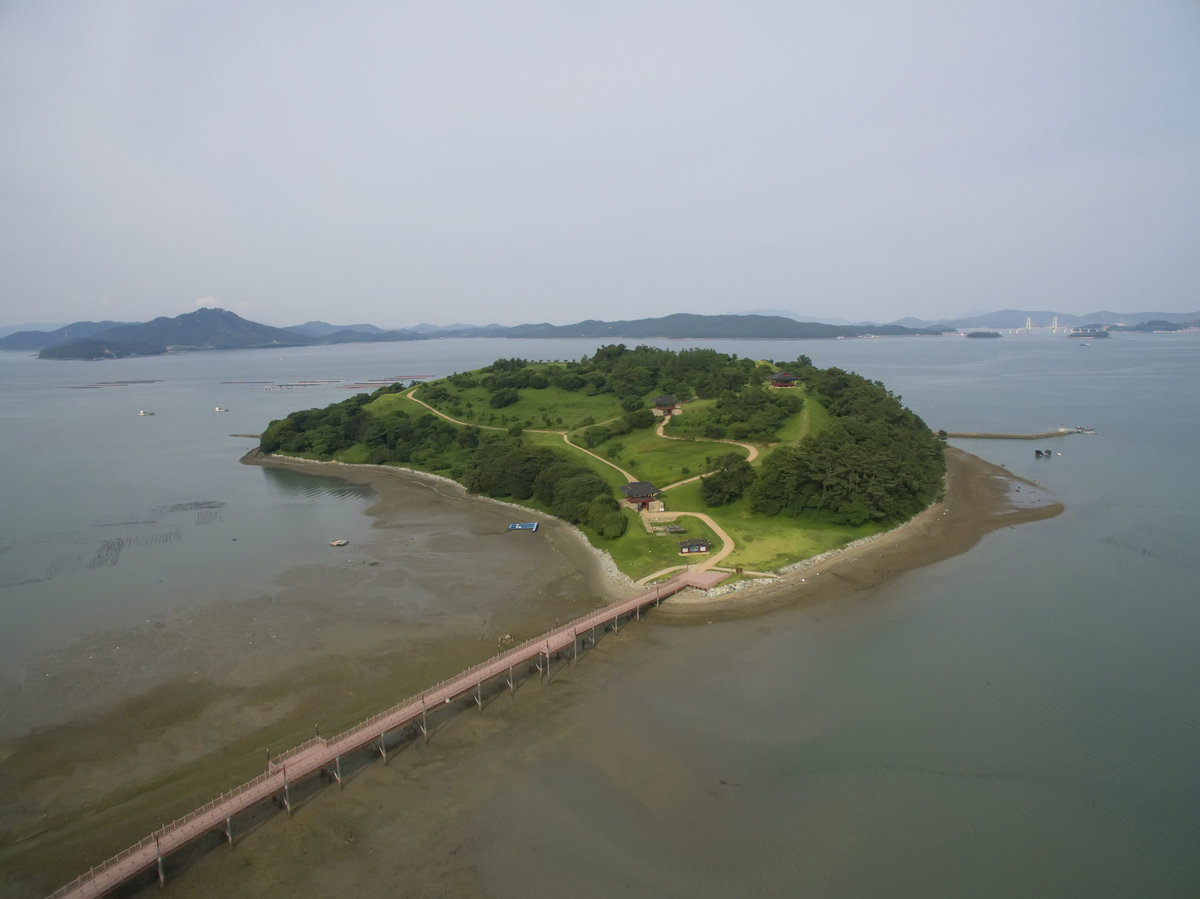
Cheonghaejin jangdo

The historic site of Cheonghaejin is the site of a military fortress dating back to the Unified Silla period located on Jangdo at 734 Jangjwa-ri, Wando-eup, Wando-gun, Jeollanam-do. The distance from Wando (island) to Jangdo is about 180m, which can be covered on foot twice a day when the ebb tide exposes the seabed.

It is a major historical site where in the 9th century during the Unified Silla, General Chang Pogo installed Cheonghaejin and cracked down on pirates and let the place serve as the stronghold for a maritime trading route that dominated the maritime trade in the seas off the three sides of the Korean Peninsula.

=== Ruins and relics ===
- Wooden Fence (Wonmokryeol): Presumed to be a wooden fence designed to defend the entrance of the island, Wonmokryeol has a length of 331 m and is mostly made of oak posts. When a specimen of the fence was radiocarbon dated, it was identified as dating to the mid-9th century.
- Cheonghaejin Castle: Stretching 890 m, the castle construction used rammed earth, which arrays in parallel one or two layers of stones at intervals of 5–6 m and compacts earth inside the framework to stack up in a robust manner.
- Historic Site of Beobhwasa (법화사터): At the foot of Sanghwang-bong ('peak') that stands behind Jangjwa-ri lies the old site of Beobhwa-sa ('Buddhist temple') reportedly constructed in imitation of Beobhwawon that Chang Pogo built in Chishan (赤山), Shandong Province.
- ㄷ-Shaped Vestiges of Rammed Earth Construction and the Well: The ㄷ-shaped vestiges of rammed earth construction is a costal structure, a type of construction found also in China and Japan. The ㄷ-shaped vestiges of rammed earth construction serve to protect the well and reinforce the outer castle gate. The remaining depth of the well is 5.8 m. Various artifacts such as earthenware flasks, iron pots, and bronze bottles believed to have been used for ceremonial purposes have been excavated from the pit or well.
- Oeseongmun ('Outer Castle Gate'): A passage that connects the inside to the outside of the fortress and serves to deter enemy attacks, stage counterattacks, or defeat enemies. The gate is reinforced by a double fortress wall.
- Naeseongmun ('Inner Castle Gate'): It is the second gate inside the castle with a defensive purpose.
- Godae ('High Site'): Located at the middle of the castle wall south of Cheonghaejin that runs from east to west, it is a vantage point at the passage that leads inland from overseas, from which it was easy to monitor offshore commercial ships and pirates.
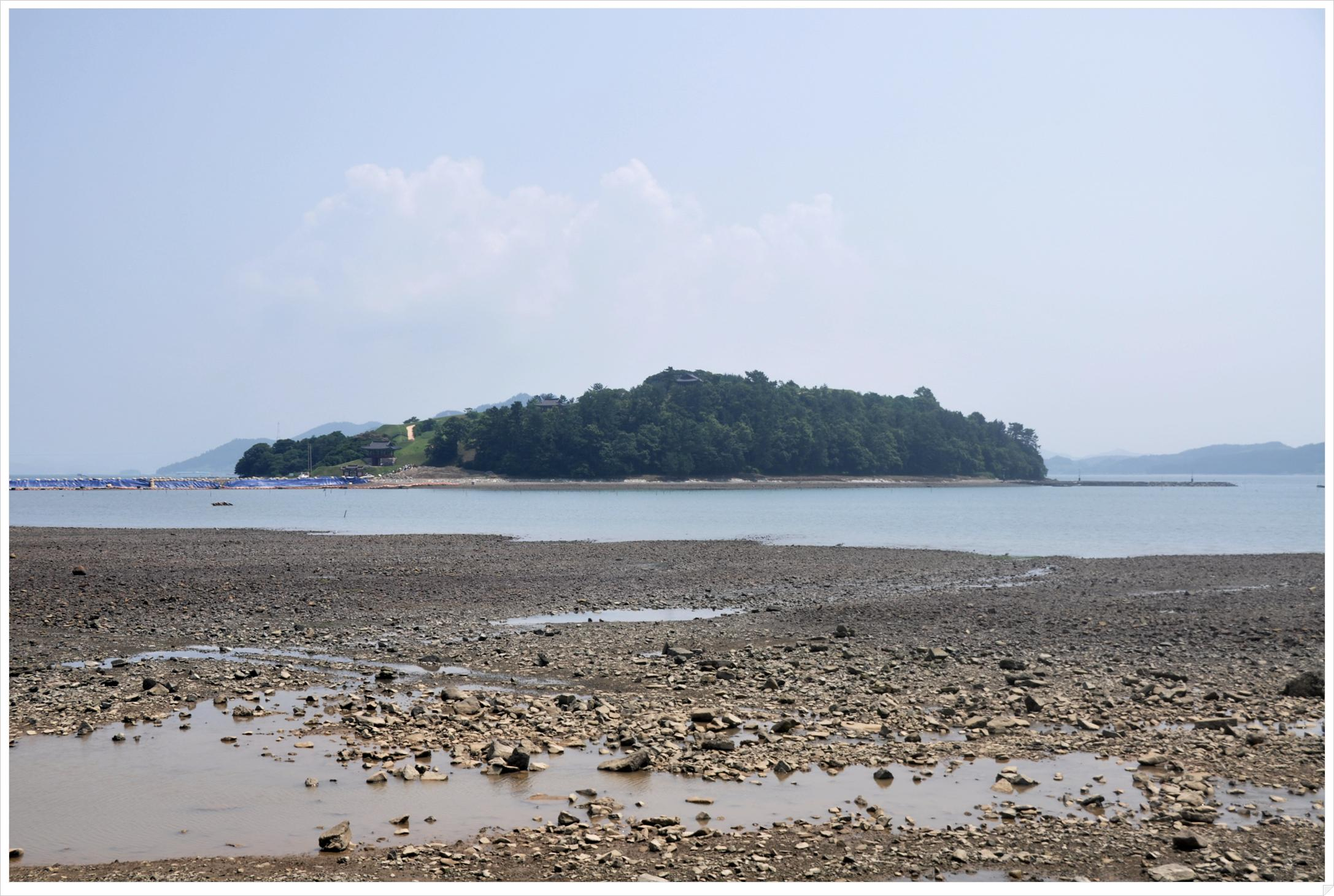
Panoramic view of Cheonghaejin.

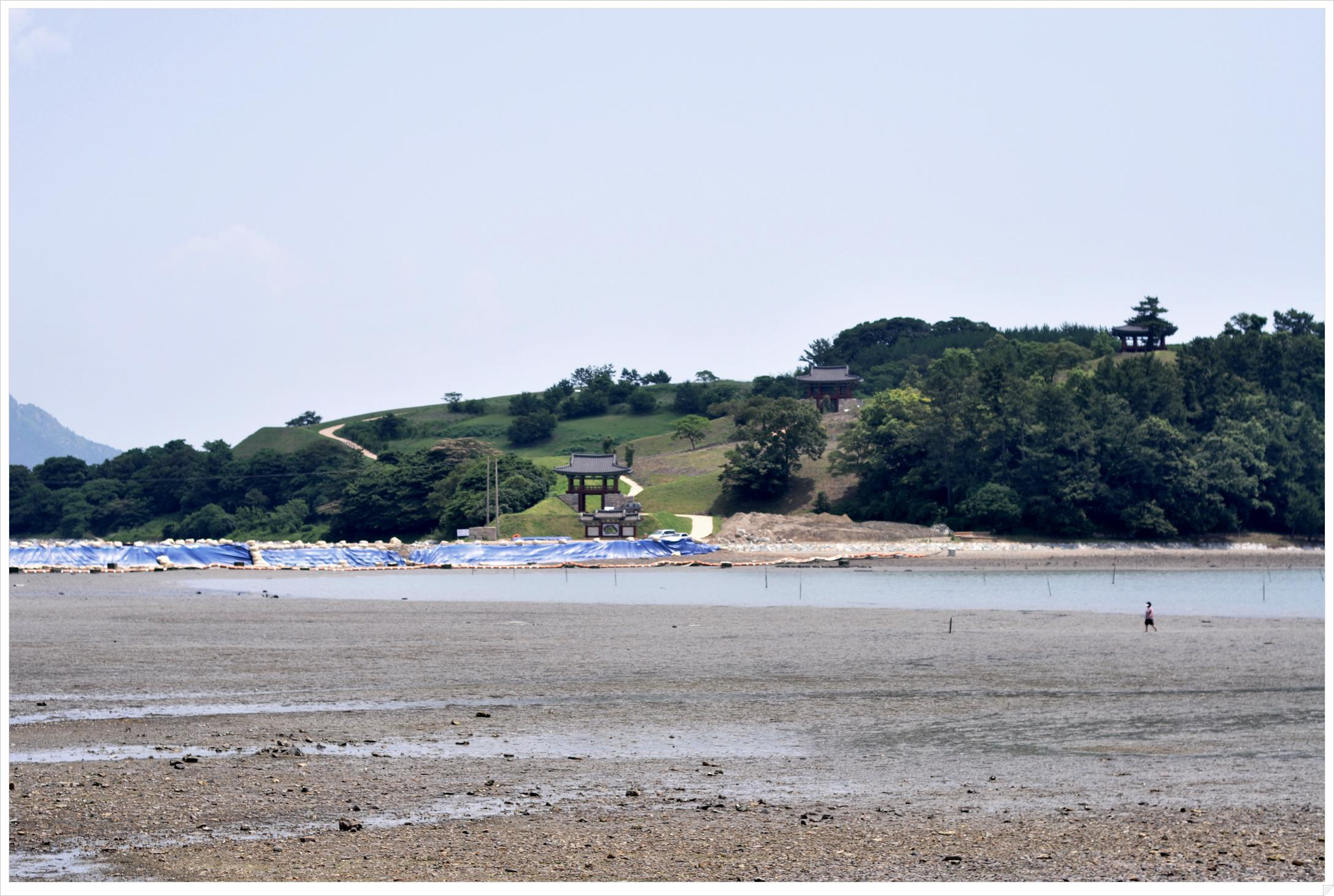
View seen from the ramp of Cheonghaejin. From left to right, "Oeseongmun Gate", "Naeseongmun Gate", and a shrine are shown.

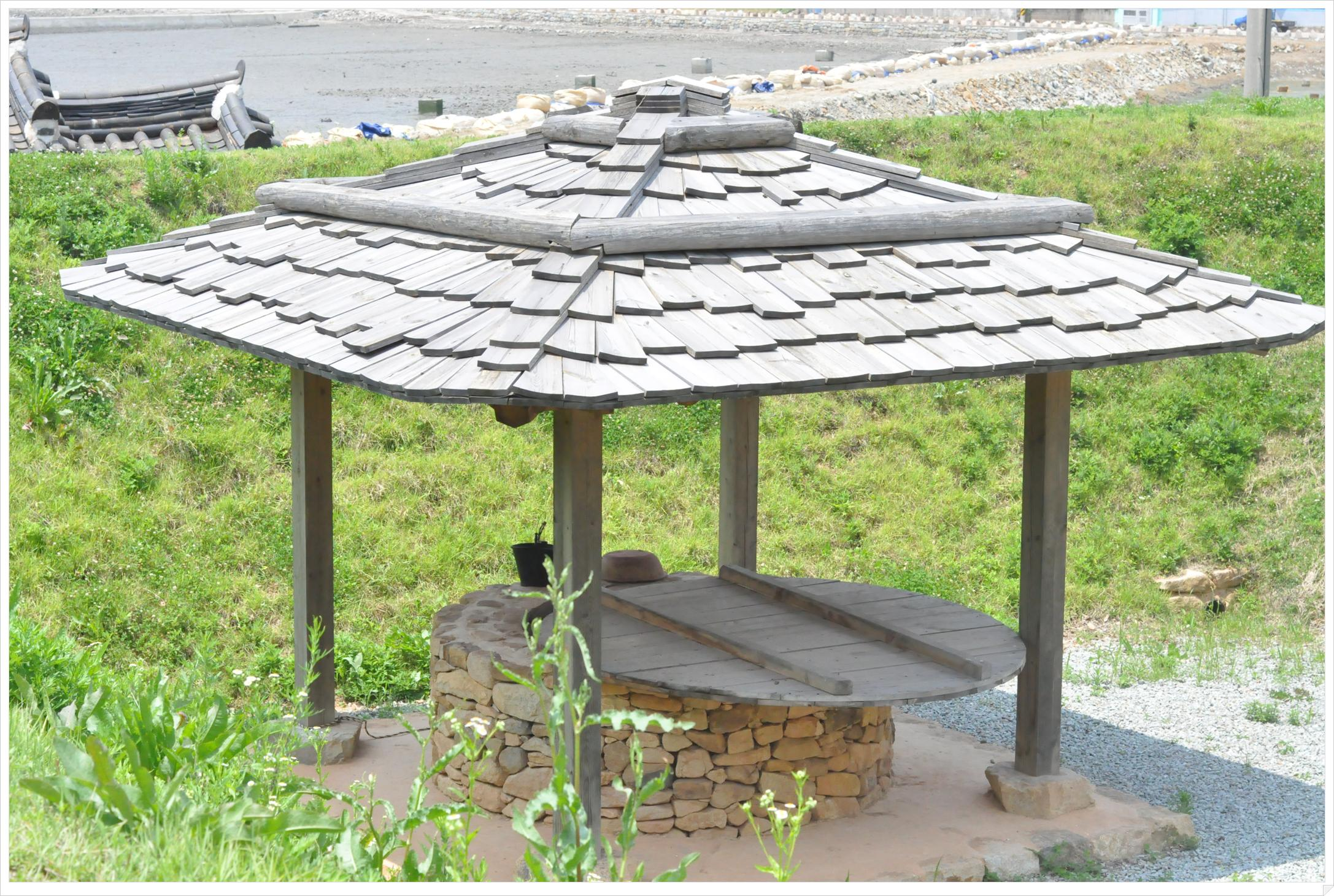
A large well in front of Oeseongmun. It is surrounded by earthen walls.

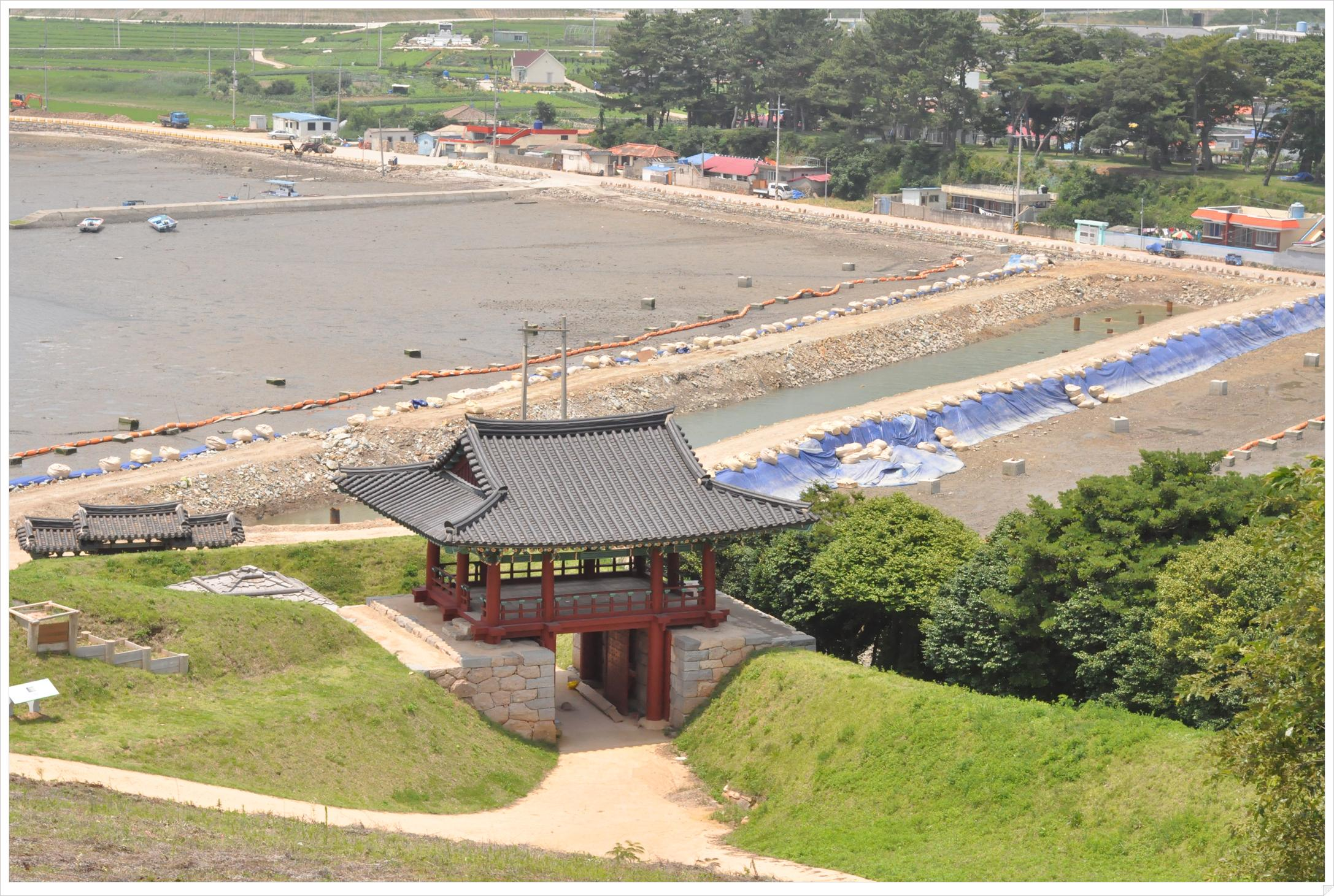
View of Oeseongmun overlooked from Naeseongmun

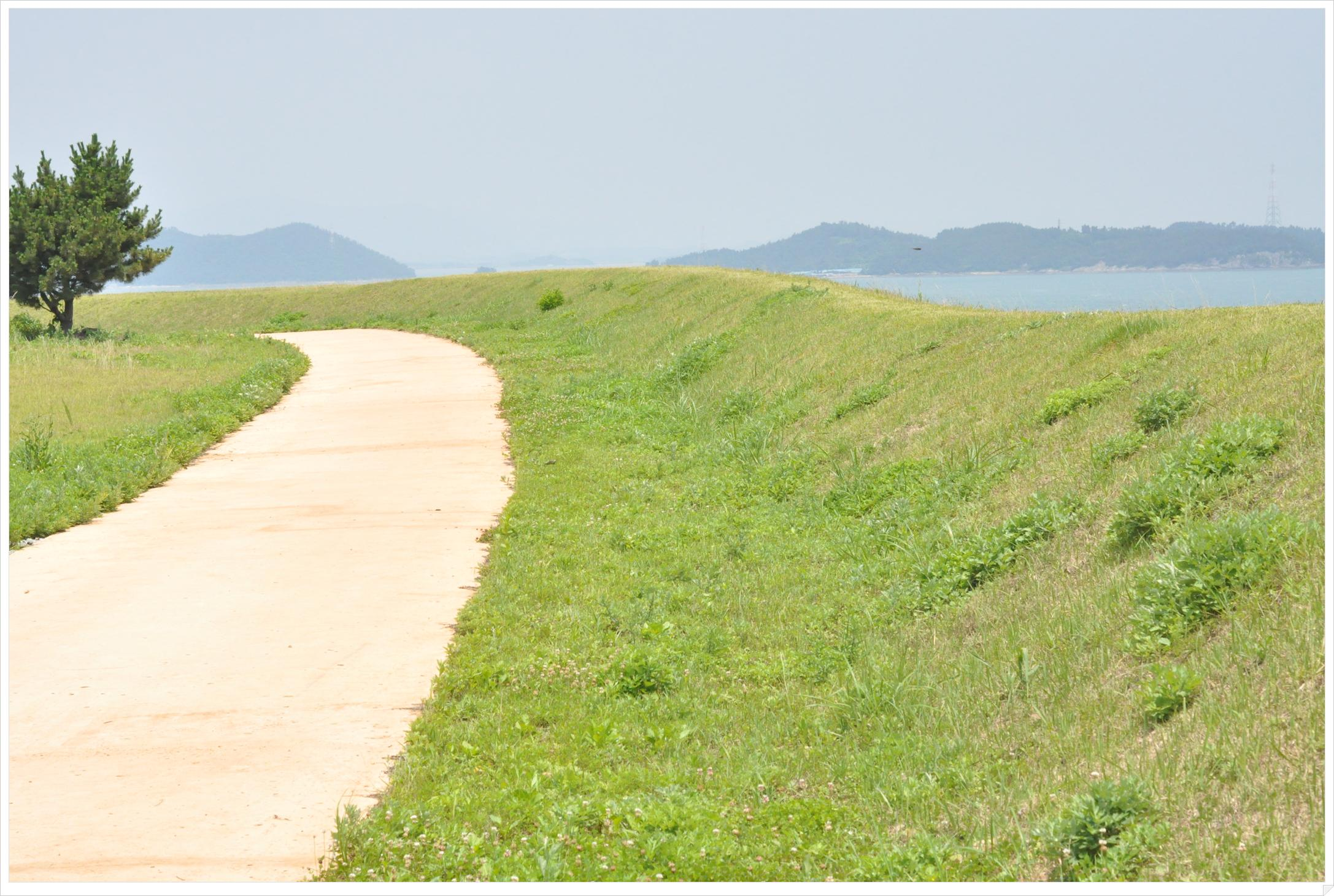
Part of the wall

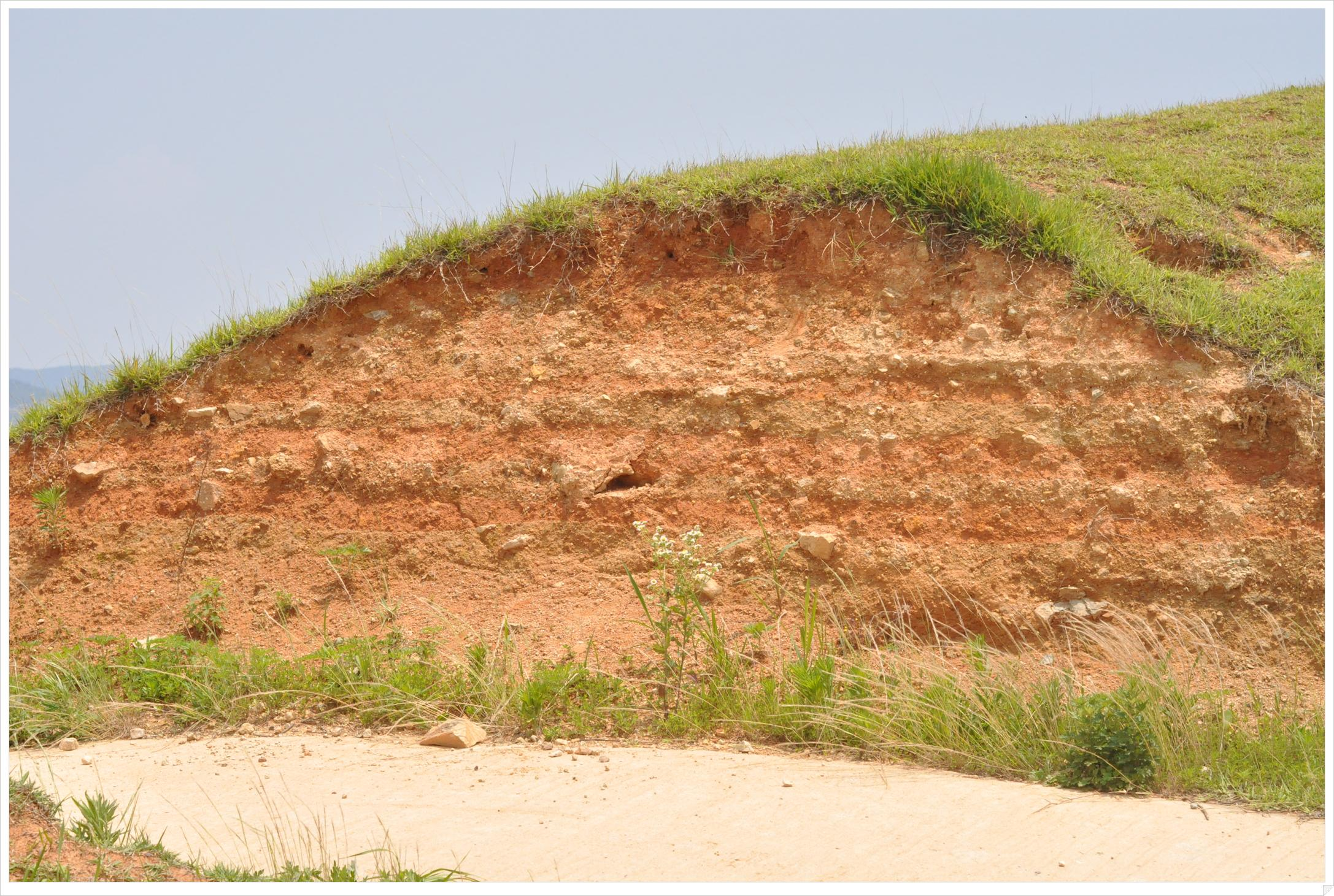
Part of the wall sectioned to show the state of heaping and hardening of earth (panchuk in Korean).

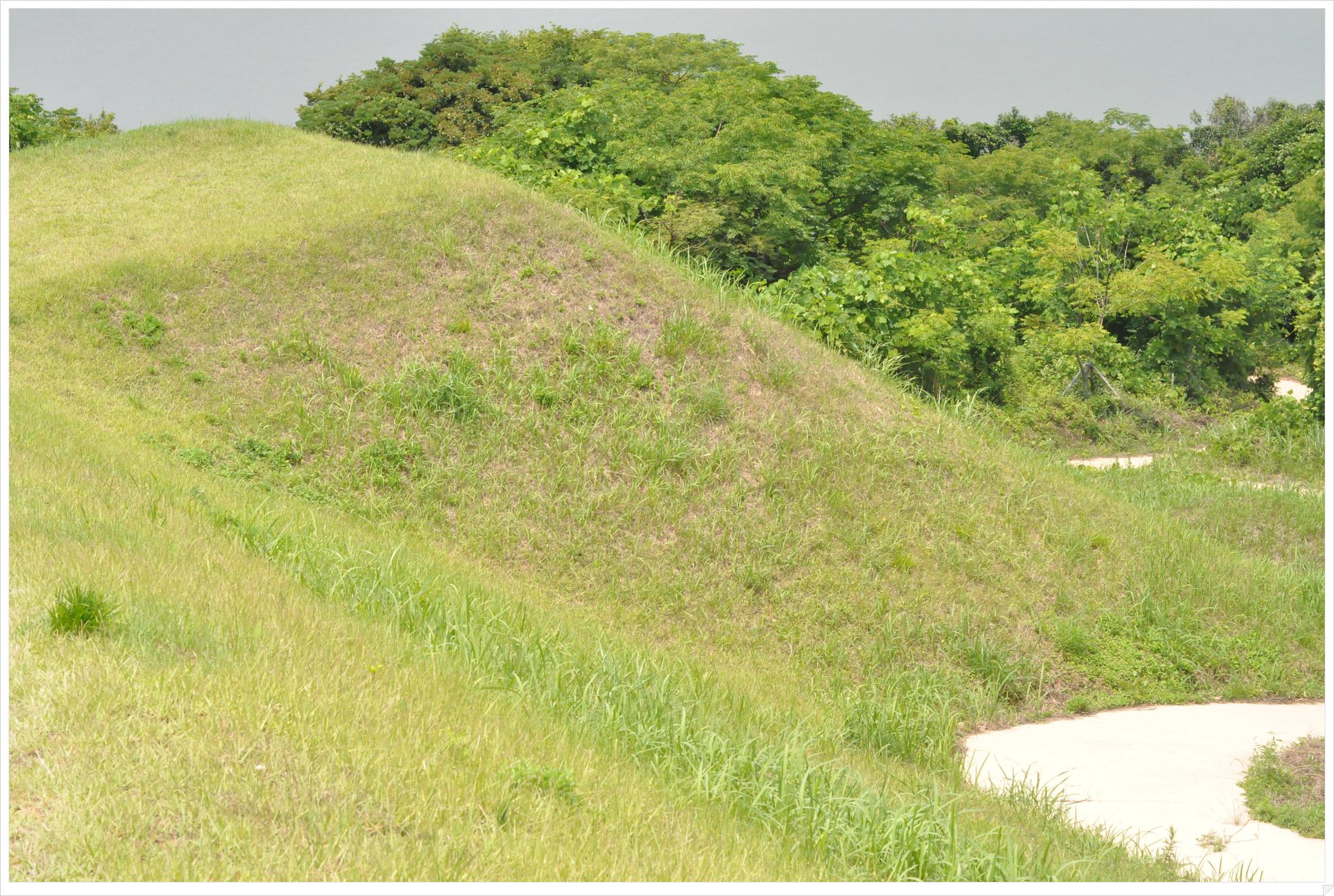
Chi, a distinctive Korean wall style. Two chi have been preserved in Cheonghaejin.
