= Daemusin of Goguryeo =

3rd King of Goguryeo (r. 14–18)

Daemusin

Crown Prince of Goguryeo
- Reign: AD 14–18
- Coronation: 14 AD
- Predecessor: Crown Prince Haemyeong
- Successor: Crown Prince Haeu

King of Goguryeo
- Reign: AD 18–44
- Coronation: 18 AD
- Predecessor: King Yuri(myeong)
- Successor: King Minjung
- Born: Muhyul/Miryu; 4 AD
- Died: 44 AD
- Burial: Daesuchonwon (대수촌원; 大獸村原)
- Spouse: Primary Consort; Secondary Consort
- Issue: Hodong; Haeu
Regnal name
- King Daejuryu (대주류왕; 大朱留王); King Daehaejuryu (대해주류왕, 大解朱留王); King Sin of Northern State (북국신왕, 北國神王)
- House: House of Go
- Father: Yuri of Goguryeo
- Mother: Queen Song

- Daemusin of Goguryeo
- Hangul: 무휼
- Hanja: 無恤
- RR: Muhyul
- MR: Muhyul

Monarch name
- Hangul: 대무신왕
- Hanja: 大武神王
- RR: Daemusinwang
- MR: Taemusinwang

Daemusin (4–44, r. 18–44) was the third king of Goguryeo, the northernmost of the Three Kingdoms of Korea. He led early Goguryeo through a period of massive territorial expansion, conquering several smaller nations and the powerful kingdom of Eastern Buyeo.

== Biography ==
He was born as Prince Muhyul, the third son of King Yuri. At 11 years old he became the crown prince, as the next in line to the throne had committed suicide, and became king upon his father's death four years later.

Daemusin strengthened central rule of Goguryeo and expanded its territory. He annexed Dongbuyeo and killed its king Daeso in 22 AD. In 26 AD he conquered Gaema-guk, along the Amnok River, and later conquered Guda-guk.

After fending off a China's attack in 28, he sent his son, Prince Hodong, who was about 16 at the time, to attack the Nangnang Commandery. He also defeated the Nakrang Kingdom in northwestern Korea in 32. He destroyed Nangnang in 37, but an Eastern Han army sent by Emperor Guangwu of Han, captured it in 44. He was buried in Daesuchonwon.

In the legend of Prince Hodong and the Princess of Nakrang Daemusin was said to have sent his son into deceiving the princess of Nakrang into destroying the drum that would have warned them for a coming invasion.

== Family ==
- Father: King Yuri (유리명왕; 瑠璃明王)
  - Grandfather: King Dongmyeong (동명성왕; 東明聖王)
  - Grandmother: Lady Ye (예씨 부인; 禮氏 夫人)
- Mother: Queen, of the Song clan (왕후 송씨; 王后 松氏)
  - Grandfather: Song Yang, Marquis Damul (송양 다물후; 松讓 多勿侯)
- Consorts and their respective issue(s):
1. Unknown lady ("Primary consort" (원비))
  1. Son: Prince Haeu (해우, 解憂; d. 53 AD)
2. Lady Hae ("Secondary consort" (차비))
  1. Son: Prince Hodong (호동, 好童; d. 32 AD) – married Princess Nakrang (낙랑공주; d. 32 AD).

== Modern depiction ==
=== Film and television ===
- Portrayed by Song Il-kook in the 2008 KBS TV series The Kingdom of The Winds.
- Portrayed by Moon Sung-keun in the 2009 SBS TV series Ja Myung Go.

=== Others ===
In recent times, Daemusin served as a model for the famous Manhwa and video game Nexus: The Kingdom of the Winds.

== Significance of title ==
King Muhyul was given the title Daemusin wang, which literally means "Great Holy Warrior King". As with most Goguryeo kings, little is known about Muhyul except for what is stated in some ancient Korean sources. Some historians have inferred that the giving of such an extreme title to this man must mean that he led Goguryeo through many outstanding military accomplishments, possibly more than he is given credit for in historical texts. Another school of thought declares that the destruction of East Buyeo in itself, was an almost unthinkable feat at the time, meaning East Buyeo was a powerful kingdom according to these select scholars.

Not all Goguryeo rulers were given special titles posthumously or in their lifetime. Most Goguryeo rulers were posthumously given titles based on the place of their burial. Only a select few, such as King Gwanggaeto the Great and King Dongmyeong, were given such "significant" posthumous names.

== See also ==
- The Kingdom of the Winds (TV drama)
- Prince Hodong and the Princess of Nakrang
- Ja Myung Go (TV drama)

Daemusin of Goguryeo House of Go Born: 4 Died: 44
Regnal titles
| Preceded by Yuri | King of Goguryeo; 18–44 | Succeeded by Minjung |
