= Wando Tower =

- 완도타워
- Location within South Korea

General information
- Type: Observatory
- Location: Wando County, South Korea, South Korea
- Coordinates: 34.3109°N 126.7665°E
- Elevation: 132 m (433 ft)
- Construction started: May 2006
- Completed: August 2008
- Inaugurated: 11 September 2008
- Client: Wando County
- Owner: Wando County

Height
- Height: 76 m (249 ft)

Technical details
- Floor count: 2 Floor and Observation Floor
- Floor area: 1,872.91 m^{2}

Website
- www.wando.go.kr/toureng/tourist/main_tour/wando_tower

Wando Tower is a 76m tall observation tower in 'Dadohae Ilchul Gongwon (Korean: 다도해 일출 공원, meaning Archipelago Sunrise Park) with an area of about 53,000 m^{2}) near the top of Dongmangsan Mountain located at 330 Jangbogodae-ro, Wando-eup, Wando County, South Jeolla Province. The tower is 2F plus the observation floor. It was completed in September 2008.

The ground floor of the tower has a local specialties exhibition hall, Chroma key photo zone, area to rest, and a video facility about Wando Island

The second floor has an image bench, and photo zone, with an observation deck.

On the observation floor at the height of 51.4m, video monitors and binoculars provide a view of the islands.
