= Song Il-kook =

South Korean actor (born 1971)

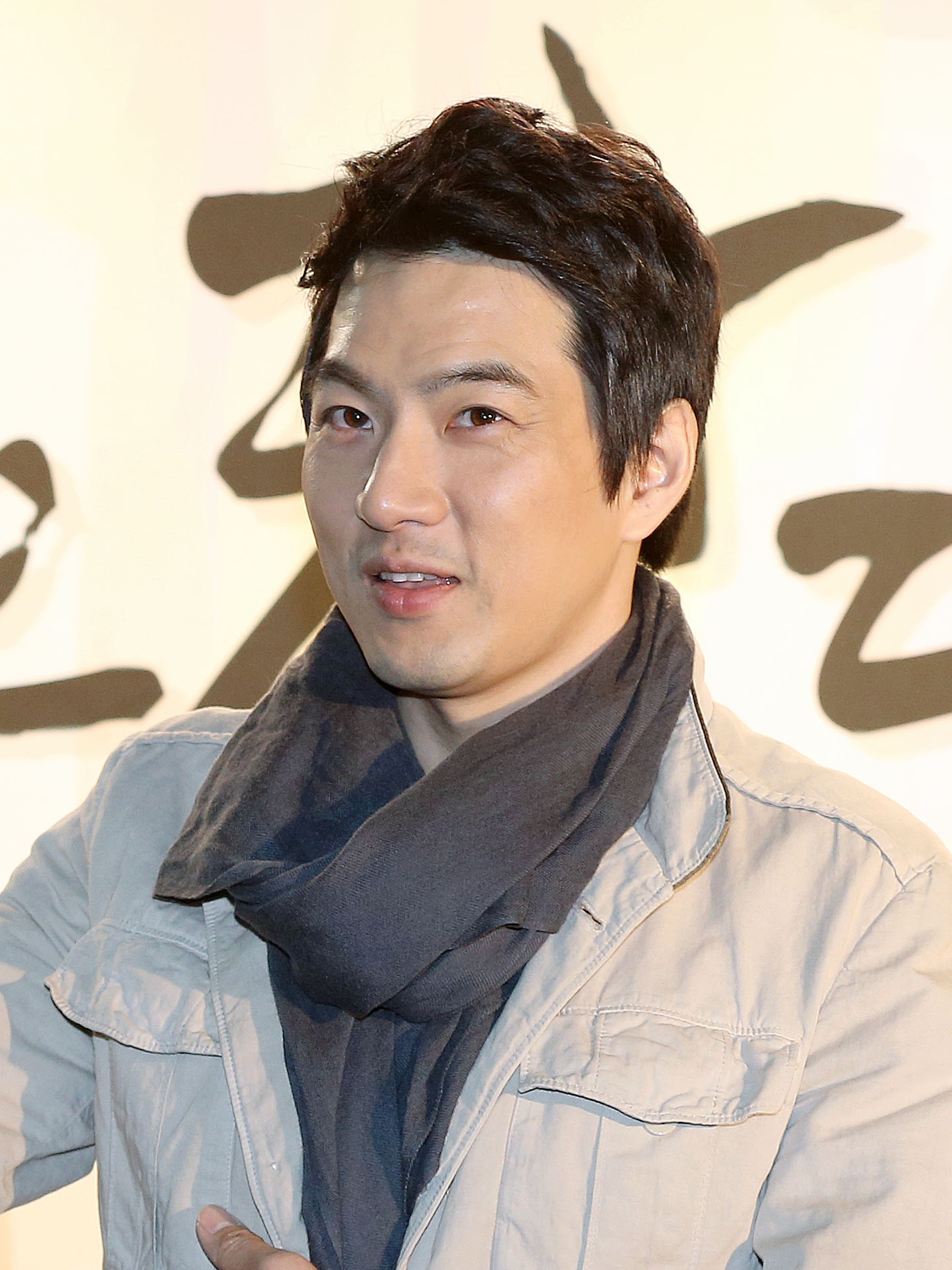
- Song in 2014
- Born: 1 October 1971 (age 55); Seoul, South Korea
- Other name: Song Il-guk
- Education: Cheongju University (BFA); Chung-Ang University (MFA)
- Occupations: Actor; television personality
- Years active: 1998–present
- Agent: C-JeS Entertainment
- Spouse: Jeong Seung-yeon (m. 2008)
- Children: 3
- Parents: Kim Eul-dong (mother); Song Jeong-woong (father)
- Relatives: Kim Du-han (grandfather); Kim Chwa-jin (great grandfather)

Korean name
- Hangul: 송일국
- Hanja: 宋一國
- RR: Song Ilguk
- MR: Song Ilguk

Song Il-kook (Korean: 송일국; born 1 October 1971) is a South Korean actor. He is best known for his role in the 2006 hit series Jumong as the titular character.

== Early life and education ==
Song is the grandson of politician Kim Du-han, great grandson of Kim Chwa-jin, the famous anarchist and Korean independence movement general during the early 1900s. Song is the son of politician and former actress Kim Eul-dong.

He graduated from Cheongju University, majoring in performing arts, and later obtained a master's degree from Chung-Ang University.

== Personal life ==
Song is the vice-president of the Korean Triathlon Confederation and participated in the 2008 Seoul International Triathlon Competition. In April 2008, Song carried the Olympic torch through Seoul.

Song is also an amateur sketch artist. He has also modelled professionally, both on the runway and in print. In 2008, he was one of the subjects of the Kolon Christmas Photo Shoot.

In 2009, the state of Hawaii designated March 21 as Song Il-kook day. In April 2010, he was invited to the Blue House to dine with Heads of State, including the president of Kazakhstan, as Jumong garnered immense popularity in the central Asian country.

=== Marriage ===
On 15 March 2008, Song was wed to High Court Judge Jung Seung-yeon in a private, traditional Korean wedding at the Sheraton Walkerhill Hotel in Seoul.

Song and Jung became parents to fraternal triplet sons at a hospital in Seoul on 16 March 2012. Their sons are named Dae-han, Min-guk and Man-se which, when said together mean "Long live the Republic of Korea". Song and his sons starred in the variety show The Return of Superman from 6 July 2014 to 7 February 2016. The triplets also made a cameo appearance in Song's television series Jang Yeong-sil (2016).

Song adheres to a pescetarian diet for both health and ethical reasons.

== Filmography ==
=== Film ===
Year	Title	Role	Notes	Ref.
2005	The Art of Seduction	Seo Min-jun		
2005	Red Eye	Chan-sik		
2014	Entangled	Hyun Ki-jeung		
2014	Fly high	Chang-beom		
2014	Vertigo	Sang-ho		
2015	Tattoo	Han Ji-soon		

=== Television series ===
Year	Title	Role	Notes	Ref.
1999	Did We Really Love?			
1999	Goodbye My Love			
1999	Into the Sunlight			
2000	All About Eve			
2002	Hard Love	Na Young-jae		
2002	Royal Story: Jang Hui-bin	Kim Chun-taek		
2002	Album of Life	Shin Hyung-shik		
2003	A Dream of a Thousand Years	Tae-sang		
2003	Bodyguard	Han Sung-soo		
2003	Desert Spring	Ki-hyun		
2004	People of the Water Flower Village	Kang Sung-woo		
2004	Terms of Endearment	Na Jang-soo		
2004	Emperor of the Sea	Yeom Moon/Yeom Jang		
2006	Jumong	Jumong, later King Dongmyeong		
2007	Lobbyist	Harry/Kim Joo-ho		
2008	The Kingdom of the Winds	Prince Muhyul, later King Daemusin		
2010	A Man Called God	Michael King/Choi Kang-ta/ Peter Pan		
2011	Crime Squad	Park Sae-hyuk		
2011	Kimchi Family	Ki Ho-tae		
2016	Jang Yeong-sil	Jang Yeong-sil		

=== Television shows ===
Year	Title	Role	Notes	Ref.
2012	Qualifications of Men	Triathlon Coach	Ep 173–174, 178–180	
2014–2016	The Return of Superman	Cast member	Ep 34–116, 156	

== Stage ==
=== Musical ===
Musical play performances
Year	Title	Role	Notes	Ref.
2016; 2020; 2022–2023	Broadway 42nd Street (브로드웨이 42번가)	Julian Marsh		
2023	Mamma Mia! (맘마미아)	Bill		

=== Theatre ===
Stage play performances
Year	Title	Role	Notes	Ref.
2010	I Am You (나는 너다)	An Jung-geun		
2017; 2019	The God of Carnage (대학살의 신)	Michelle		
2024	Macbeth (맥베스)	Banquo		

== Accolades ==
=== Awards and nominations ===
Name of the award ceremony, year presented, category, nominee of the award, and the result of the nomination
Award ceremony	Year	Category	Nominee / Work	Result	Ref.
Asia Model Awards	2009	Asia Star Awards	Song Il-kook	Won	
Baeksang Arts Awards	2007	Best Actor – Television	Jumong	Nominated	
Baeksang Arts Awards	2009	Best Actor – Television	The Kingdom of the Winds	Nominated	
Grimae Awards	2006	Best Actor	Jumong	Won	
Historical Drama Festival	2013	Historical Drama Star Who's Brightened Korea	Song Il-kook	Won	
KBS Drama Awards	2002	Best New Actor	Album of Life	Won	
KBS Drama Awards	2003	Excellence Award, Actor	Bodyguard	Nominated	
KBS Drama Awards	2004	Best Couple Award	Song Il-kook (with Han Ga-in); Terms of Endearment	Won	
KBS Drama Awards	2004	Excellence Award, Actor	Terms of Endearment	Nominated	
KBS Drama Awards	2005	Best Couple Award	Song Il-kook (with Soo Ae); Emperor of the Sea	Won	
KBS Drama Awards	2005	Excellence Award, Actor	Emperor of the Sea	Won	
KBS Drama Awards	2005	Popularity Award, Actor	Emperor of the Sea	Won	
KBS Drama Awards	2008	Best Couple Award	Song Il-kook (with Choi Jung-won); The Kingdom of the Winds	Won	
KBS Drama Awards	2008	Top Excellence Award, Actor	The Kingdom of the Winds	Won	
KBS Drama Awards	2008	Grand Prize (Daesang)	The Kingdom of the Winds	Nominated	
KBS Drama Awards	2011	Excellence Award, Actor in a Miniseries	Crime Squad	Nominated	
KBS Drama Awards	2016	Excellence Award, Actor in a Mid-length Drama	Jang Yeong-sil	Won	
KBS Drama Awards	2016	Top Excellence Award, Actor	Jang Yeong-sil	Nominated	
KBS Drama Awards	2016	Grand Prize (Daesang)	Jang Yeong-sil	Nominated	
KBS Entertainment Awards	2014	Producers' Special Award	The Return of Superman	Won	
KBS Entertainment Awards	2015	Excellence Award, Male in Variety Show Category	The Return of Superman	Won	
Korea Producer's Awards	2007	Best Actor	Jumong	Won	
Korean Culture and Entertainment Awards	2006	Best Actor	Jumong	Won	
MBC Drama Awards	2004	Best New Actor	People of the Water Flower Village	Nominated	
MBC Drama Awards	2006	Grand Prize (Daesang)	Jumong	Won	
MBC Drama Awards	2006	Top Excellence Award, Actor	Jumong	Won	
SBS Drama Awards	2007	Top Excellence Award, Actor	Lobbyist	Nominated	

=== Honors ===
Name of country or organization, year given, and name of honor or award
Country or organization	Year	Honor / Award	Ref.
Goodwill Cooperation Service (GCS)	2012	Award for Service Towards World Peace, Celebrities Who Serve Category	
National Tax Service (Note: Honors are given at Taxpayers' Day, organized by National Tax Service. Taxpayers' Day in Korea is March 3. An award ceremony is held annually, during which individuals and corporations receive commendation for being model taxpayers.)	2007	Presidential Commendation as Exemplary Taxpayer	
South Korea (Note: Honors are given at the Korean Popular Culture and Arts Awards, arranged by the Korea Creative Content Agency and hosted by the Ministry of Culture, Sports and Tourism. They are awarded to those who have contributed to the arts and South Korea's pop culture.)	2011	Minister of Culture, Sports and Tourism Commendation	
