= Minjung of Goguryeo =

4th King of Goguryeo (r. 44–48)

King of Goguryeo
- Reign: AD 44–48
- Predecessor: King Daemusin
- Successor: King Mobon
- Born: Hae Saekju / Hae Eupju c.AD 5-18
- Died: 48 AD
- Burial: Minjungwon (민중원; 閔中原)
- House: House of Hae
- Father: Go Yuri

Korean name
- Hangul: 해색주
- Hanja: 解色朱
- RR: Hae Saekju
- MR: Hae Saekchu

Monarch name
- Hangul: 민중왕
- Hanja: 閔中王
- RR: Minjungwang
- MR: Minjungwang

King Minjung (?–48, r. 44–48) was the fourth ruler of Goguryeo, the northernmost of the Three Kingdoms of Korea. According to The History of the Three Kingdoms, he was the younger brother of the country's third ruler, King Daemusin, and the fifth son of the second ruler, King Yuri.

== Background ==
According to the Samguk sagi, a 12th-century Korean history of the Three Kingdoms, Minjung was the fifth and youngest son of Yuri (Goguryeo's second King), as well as the youngest brother of his predecessor Daemusin. His original name was Hae Saek-ju or Hae Eup-ju, and some scholars believe the king's surname was Hae. The Samguk sagi states that at the time of Daemusin's death the crown prince was his eldest son Mobon (then known as Hae U), but Mobon was still too young to rule. Thus, Minjung (then known as Haesaekjoo) ascended to the throne with national support.^{[2]} However, an alternative account exists in the Samguk yusa, stating that Minjung was the son of Daemusin and the younger brother of Mobon.

== Reign ==
During Minjung's five years of reign, he avoided military conflict and maintained peace throughout most of the kingdom. A massive pardon of prisoners occurred in his first year of reign. (Note: From Samguk sagi "閔中王 諱解色朱 大武神王之弟也 大武神王薨 太子幼少 不克卽政 於是 國人推戴以立之 冬十一月 大赦".) Several natural disasters marked his reign, including a flood during his second year of reign that occurred in the eastern provinces causing several citizens to lose their homes and starve. Seeing this, Minjung opened up the food storage and distributed food to the people. (Note: cited from book 14 of Samguk sagi, 2nd volume of Goguryeo bongi. "二年 春三月 宴群臣 夏五月 國東大水 民饑 發倉賑給".) In his third year of reign, it didn't snow in the capital. (Note: Samguk sagi,"三年 秋七月 王東狩 獲白獐 冬十一月 星孛于南 二十日而滅 十二月 京都無雪") In his fourth year of reign, Minjung found a stone grotto in the Western region of his kingdom and was said to have rested in it after a long hunt.

== Death ==
In the year 48, during the fifth year of his reign, Minjung fell ill and died. On his deathbed, he requested to be buried in a grotto in Minjung-won, where he was eventually laid to rest. As a result, he was given the posthumous name, Minjung.

== See also ==
- History of Korea
- Three Kingdoms of Korea
- List of Korean monarchs

== Notes ==
Minjung of Goguryeo House of Go Died: 48
Regnal titles
Preceded by Daemusin	King of Goguryeo; 44–48	Succeeded by Mobon
