= Choi Soo-jong =

South Korean actor (born 1962)

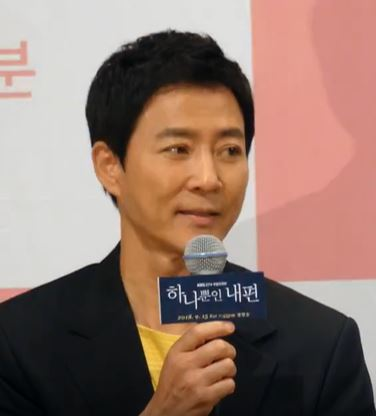
- Choi in September 2018
- Born: December 18, 1962 (age 63); Seoul, South Korea
- Occupation: Actor
- Years active: 1987–present
- Spouse: Ha Hee-ra (m. 1993)
- Children: 2

Korean name
- Hangul: 최수종
- RR: Choe Sujong
- MR: Ch'oe Sujong

Choi Soo-jong (Korean: 최수종; born December 18, 1962) is a South Korean actor. Choi made his debut in 1987 as a young actor in the TV soap opera Love Tree. He has appeared in movies, on television and as an MC for various award shows. He has received worldwide recognition for his leading roles in some of the highest-rated Korean dramas of all time, including Jealousy (1992), Sons and Daughters (1992–1993), Pilot (1993), Ambition (1994), Blowing of the Wind (1995–1996), First Love (1996–1997), Legend of Ambition (1998), Taejo Wang Geon (2000–2002).

Most recently, Choi garnered acclaim for his leading role in My Only One (2018–2019). He is also well known for his portrayals in the Korean historical dramas Emperor of the Sea (2004–2005), played the role of Jang Bogo, and as the title character Dae Joyoung in the epic series Dae Jo-yeong (2006–2007).

== Career ==
When reflecting on his more than twenty years as an actor, Choi said "To an actor, fame is short, but acting is long."

As a public figure and social activist, Choi Soo-jong has sought to project an image of integrity and wholesomeness. His fidelity to his wife and dedication to his role as father and husband are widely discussed in the media, although he strives to retain his family's privacy. Choi also openly discusses his commitment to clean living through regular exercise and healthy eating. Despite his advancing age, Choi continues to accept physically challenging roles that require horseback riding, combat and swordsmanship, and exposure to extreme temperatures. His youthful appearance and physical fitness allow Choi to play characters much younger than his actual age.

Despite Choi's image of integrity and health, in 2007 his career was briefly overshadowed by a scandal. In a series of news stories, it was revealed that several high-profile Korean actors had falsified their academic credentials. Choi was among those whose educational background on his resume proved to be exaggerated and included untrue information. Choi tearfully apologized for misleading the public.

In 2010, Choi was cast in a lead role in Legend of the Patriots, a remake of the 1975 series Comrades. According to a press release from KBS, Choi found acting in a war drama even more challenging than the historical dramas he is known for. When asked why he chose to pursue the challenging genre of war drama, Choi stated "There is a problem though that the more I act, the more I become greedy for acting. What do I have to do from now on? Anyway, I want to remain as a good actor as I put more effort into managing myself"."

On January 3, 2022, Choi was appointed as the new president of the Korean Broadcasting Actors Association.

== Personal life ==
Choi is married to actress Ha Hee Ra, a Hwagyo. They have two children together: son Min-seo (1999) and daughter Yoon-seo (2000). Choi Soo-jong and Ha Hee Ra's happy marriage is well-known in Korea. When Ha was pregnant, Choi did the housework, cooked, and let her rest, a fact that has made Choi very popular with Korean women and jokingly scorned by Korean men. In a television interview in early 2010, Choi's wife Ha stated her husband is a better housekeeper than she is. Choi is frequently seen text messaging and making phone calls with his wife Ha Hee Ra while filming and was even documented doing so in the television special for Emperor of the Sea.

Choi has a reputation amongst co-stars as funny and bright. He is known as a jokester on the set that has earned him the title "NG Mawang" (NG Master). When he makes an NG (blooper), he attempts to make light of his error.

In his free time, Choi enjoys playing soccer on Sunday mornings. In 2008, Choi announced that he would also begin studying English in his spare time.

== Social activities ==
When not filming, Choi and his wife also are involved with charitable projects both jointly and separately. They contribute regularly to charitable causes in addition to actively volunteering for causes such as disabled children and were actively involved in the cleaning up after the massive oil spill in Korea in 2007. In the first half of 2009, Choi and Ha were selected to be the ambassadors for a worldwide campaign against tuberculosis. Also in 2009, Choi and Ha became goodwill ambassadors of the National Museum of Korea and sponsored a project to provide 50,000 Korean language guidebooks for visitors to the American Museum of Natural History in New York.

Additionally, in December 2008, Choi was one of five celebrities appointed as a goodwill ambassador to the Korean capital Seoul. As a member of the "Fabulous Five," Choi was chosen to publicize the international appeal of the city. In June 2009, Choi Soo-jong and six other high-profile actors waived their fees to teach master acting classes at Im Kwon-taek Film and Art College of Dongseo University.

== Filmography ==
=== Films ===
- Obedience (documentary, 2016)
- Iron Bag, Mr. Woo-soo (2012)
- The Man Who Cannot Kiss (1994)
- Man Upstairs, Woman Downstairs (1992)
- The Night Full of Stars (1991)
- Do You Like the Afternoon After the Rain? (1991)
- To You Again (1991)
- You Know What, It's A Secret (1990)
- Superman Yiljimae (1990)
- Puppy Love (1988)
- A Young Punch (1988)

=== Television ===
- Korea–Khitan War as Gang Gam-chan (KBS2, 2023)
- Record of Youth (Cameo) (tvN,2020)
- My Only One (KBS2, 2018)
- Imjin War 1592 (2016)
- Into the Flames (TV Chosun, 2014)
- You Are the Boss! (MBC, 2013) (cameo)
- Dream of the Emperor (KBS1, 2012)
- KBS Drama Special: For Her Son (KBS2, 2011)
- The President (KBS2, 2010)
- Legend of the Patriots (KBS1, 2010)
- Korean Ghost Stories: Curse of the Sajin Sword (KBS2, 2008)
- Dae Jo-yeong (KBS1, 2006)
- Emperor of the Sea (KBS2, 2004)
- War of the Roses (MBC, 2004)
- On the Prairie (KBS2, 2003)
- Man of the Sun, Lee Je-ma (KBS2, 2002)
- Taejo Wang Geon (KBS1, 2000)
- Did We Really Love? (KBS2, 1999)
- People's House (KBS1, 1999)
- Beautiful Secret (KBS2, 1999)
- Legend of Ambition (KBS2, 1998)
- When She Beckons (KBS2, 1997)
- Fireworks (MBC, 1997)
- Three Guys and Three Girls (MBC, 1997) (cameo)
- First Love (KBS2, 1996)
- Blowing of the Wind (KBS2, 1995)
- Last Lovers (MBC, 1994)
- Rival of History (KBS1, 1994)
- Ambition (MBC, 1994)
- Pilot (MBC, 1993)
- Hot River (MBC, 1993)
- Drama Game (KBS2 1993)
- Best Theater (MBC, 1993)
- Bong Yi-jeon (KBS2, 1993)
- Sons and Daughters (MBC, 1992–1993)
- Chunwon Yi Kwang-su (MBC, 1992)
- Jealousy (MBC, 1992)
- City People (MBC, 1992)
- The Family (KBS2, 1991–1992)
- Happiness Dictionary (MBC, 1991)
- Chunsa Na Woon-gyu (MBC, 1991)
- Seoul Earthenware Pot (KBS1, 1990)
- Daewongun (MBC, 1990)
- Love's Open Every Hour (MBC, 1990)
- Love Rains Clouds (MBC, 1989)
- Sir (MBC, 1989)
- Principal Investigator (MBC, 1989)
- The Memoirs of Lady Hyegyeong (MBC, 1988–1989)
- Queen Inhyeon (MBC, 1988)
- Love Tree (KBS, 1987–1990)

=== Variety shows ===
- You'll Know when You Leave (2023; New Year's specials) with Do Kyung-wan
- Second House (2022–2023; Season 1–2) with Ha Hee-ra
- This is Wild 3 (2022)
- Melodies of Korea (2020)
- Friendly Variety Show (January 2020–May 2020)
- Choi Soo-jong Show (2003)

=== Hosting ===
Year	Title	Notes	Ref.
2022	opening ceremony 19th EBS International Documentary Film Festival (EIDF)	with Park Kyung-lim	
2023	Public Broadcasting 50th Anniversary Special	with Kang Ho-dong And Chae Shi-ra	

== Awards and nominations ==
Year	Award	Category	Nominated work	Result
1990	KBS Drama Awards	Popularity Award		Won
1991	27th Baeksang Arts Awards	Popularity Award in Film	Well, It's A Secret	Won
1991	MBC Drama Awards	Excellence Award, Actor		Won
1991	KBS Drama Awards	Popularity Award		Won
1992	MBC Drama Awards	Top Excellence Award, Actor	Jealousy	Won
1993	MBC Drama Awards	Top Excellence Award, Actor	Sons and Daughters	Won
1994	30th Baeksang Arts Awards	Popularity Award in TV	Pilot	Won
1995	KBS Drama Awards	Popularity Award	Blowing of the Wind	Won
1995	KBS Drama Awards	Top Excellence Award, Actor	Blowing of the Wind	Nominated
1996	KBS Drama Awards	Top Excellence Award, Actor	First Love	Won
1997	10th Grimae Awards	Best Actor	First Love	Won
1998	25th Korea Broadcasting Awards	Best Actor	Legendary Ambition	Won
1998	KBS Drama Awards	Photogenic Award	Legendary Ambition	Won
1998	KBS Drama Awards	Top Excellence Award, Actor	Legendary Ambition	Nominated
1998	KBS Drama Awards	Grand Prize/Daesang	Legendary Ambition	Won
1999	35th Baeksang Arts Awards	Best Actor in TV	Legendary Ambition	Won
1999	KBS Drama Awards	Popularity Award	Did You Ever Love?	Won
1999	KBS Drama Awards	Top Excellence Award, Actor	Did You Ever Love?	Nominated
2001	KBS Drama Awards	Top Excellence Award, Actor	Emperor Wang Gun	Nominated
2001	KBS Drama Awards	Grand Prize/Daesang	Emperor Wang Gun	Won
2002	KBS Drama Awards	Popularity Award	Man of the Sun, Lee Je-ma	Won
2002	KBS Drama Awards	Top Excellence Award, Actor	Man of the Sun, Lee Je-ma	Nominated
2003	KBS Drama Awards	Special Award		Won
2005	KBS Drama Awards	Top Excellence Award, Actor	Emperor of the Sea	Won
2006	1st Seoul International Drama Awards	Best Actor	Emperor of the Sea	Nominated
2006	KBS Drama Awards	Top Excellence Award, Actor	Dae Jo-yeong	Nominated
2007	KBS Drama Awards	Netizen Award	Dae Jo-yeong	Won
2007	KBS Drama Awards	Top Excellence Award, Actor	Dae Jo-yeong	Nominated
2007	KBS Drama Awards	Grand Prize/Daesang	Dae Jo-yeong	Won
2008	2nd Korea Drama Awards	Top Excellence Award, Actor	Dae Jo-yeong	Won
2008	35th Korea Broadcasting Association Awards	Best Actor	Dae Jo-yeong	Won
2008	KBS Drama Awards	Excellence Award, Actor in a One-Act/Special/Short Drama	Hometown Legends - "The Curse of Sajin Sword"	Nominated
2010	KBS Drama Awards	Top Excellence Award, Actor	Legend of the Patriots	Nominated
2011	KBS Drama Awards	Excellence Award, Actor in a One-Act/Special/Short Drama	For My Son	Won
2012	KBS Drama Awards	Excellence Award, Actor in a Serial Drama	Dream of the Emperor	Nominated
2012	KBS Drama Awards	Top Excellence Award, Actor	Dream of the Emperor	Nominated
2013	KBS Drama Awards	Excellence Award, Actor in a Serial Drama	Dream of the Emperor	Nominated
2013	KBS Drama Awards	Top Excellence Award, Actor	Dream of the Emperor	Nominated
2014	Miss Supertalent Star Awards	Excellence Award, Actor	Korean Wave	Won
2018	KBS Drama Awards	Top Excellence Award, Actor	My Only One	Won
2018	KBS Drama Awards	Excellence Award, Actor in a Serial Drama	My Only One	Nominated
2018	KBS Drama Awards	Best Couple (with Jin Kyung)	My Only One	Won
2019	12th Korea Drama Awards	Grand Prize (Daesang)	My Only One	Won
2021	19th KBS Entertainment Awards	Achievement Award	Mr. House Husband 2	Won
2021	19th KBS Entertainment Awards	Excellence Award in Reality Category	Mr. House Husband 2	Nominated
2023	KBS Drama Awards	Grand Prize/Daesang	Korea–Khitan War	Won
2023	KBS Drama Awards	Top Excellence Award, Actor	Korea–Khitan War	Nominated
2023	KBS Drama Awards	Excellence Award, Actor in a Serial Drama	Korea–Khitan War	Nominated
2023	KBS Drama Awards	Popularity Award, Actor	Korea–Khitan War	Nominated
2023	KBS Drama Awards	Best Couple Award	Choi Soo-jong (with Kim Dong-jun); Korea–Khitan War	Won
