= Choi Ri (Lelang) =

Person mentioned in Samguk Sagi

- Hangul: 최리
- Hanja: 崔理
- Revised Romanization: Choeri
- McCune–Reischauer: Ch'oeri

According to the ancient Korean record of Samguk Sagi, Choi Ri (Korean: 최리; Hanja: 崔理) was the king of Nakrang Kingdom. However, the kingdom's sovereignty is disputed along with Choi Ri's title. Many Korean scholars view Nakrang as an independent kingdom and Choi Ri as Nakrang's king, but Chinese and Japanese scholars usually claim that the name Nakrang referred to Lelang Commandery and Choi Ri was a Chinese governor of the commandery.

== Outline ==
When Hodong, a child of Daemusin of Goguryeo, the third king of Goguryeo went Okjeo for hunting, he met Choi Ri who was the king of Nakrang Kingdom and decided to welcome his daughter Princess of Nakrang as a wife of Hodong. Daemusin of Goguryeo was planning to attack Nakrang Kingdom, and asked Hodong to destroy the drum and Oliphant that automatically notify people when enemy attack the country. Hodong send a messenger and ask Princess of Nakrang to destroy the drum and Oliphant.

For Hodong, Princess of Nakrang destroyed the drum and Oliphant by a sword, after that Goguryeo attacked Nakrang Kingdom. Choi Ri could not be prepared for that attack because the drum and Oliphant were destroyed and he could not know Goguryeo’s invasion. He only knew that the drums and Oliphant were destroyed after Goguryeo’s aggression, but there’s nothing to do but surrender to Goguryeo. At that time, Choi Ri killed Princess of Nakrang who destroyed the drum and Oliphant.

== Issue ==
- Daughter: Princess Nakrang
  - Son in-law: Prince Hodong

== In popular culture ==
- Portrayed by Hong Yo-seob in the 2009 SBS Television series Ja Myung Go
