= Yŏm Chang =

Silla general (fl. 9th century)

- Hangul: 염장
- Hanja: 閻長
- RR: Yeom Jang
- MR: Yŏm Chang

Yŏm Chang (Korean: 염장; Hanja: 閻長, ? – ?), also mentioned as Yŏm Mun, was a Silla general who is best known for assassinating Chang Pogo. Yŏm had been a subordinate of Chang Pogo, but their relationship apparently deteriorated as he was once punished by Chang Pogo for having been personally engaged in slave trade.

Eventually, Yŏm Chang, under the direction of Kim Yang, assassinated Chang Pogo.

== In popular culture ==
- Portrayed by Song Il-gook and Hong Hyun-ki in the 2004–2005 KBS2 TV series Emperor of the Sea.

== See also ==
- Chang Pogo
- Silla
- History of Korea
