= Mobon of Goguryeo =

5th King of Goguryeo (r. 32–44)

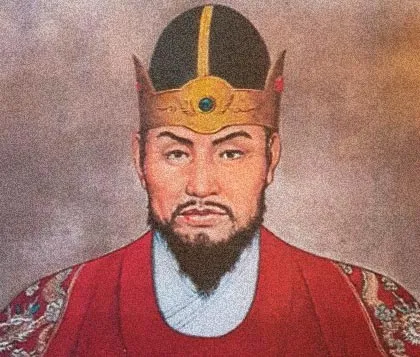
- A portrait of King Mobun painted by the Korean History Reconstruction and Innovation Association in South Korea.

Crown Prince of Goguryeo
- Reign: AD 32–44
- Predecessor: Crown Prince Muhyul
- Successor: Crown Prince Nammu

King of Goguryeo
- Reign: AD 48–53
- Predecessor: King Minjung
- Successor: King Taejo
- Born: Hae-u / Hae Aeru; 30 AD?
- Died: 53 AD (aged 22)
- Burial: Mobonwon (모본원; 慕本原)
- Issue: Prince Ik (익; 翊)
- House: House of Go
- Father: Daemusin of Goguryeo
- Mother: Primary Consort

Korean name
- Hangul: 해우; 애루; 막래
- Hanja: 解憂; 愛婁; 莫來
- RR: Haeu; Aeru; Makrae
- MR: Haeu; Aeru; Mangnae

Monarch name
- Hangul: 모본왕
- Hanja: 慕本王
- RR: Mobonwang
- MR: Mobonwang

King Mobon (30–53, r. 48–53) was the fifth king of Goguryeo, the northernmost of the Three Kingdoms of Korea.

== Background and reign ==
According to the Samguk sagi, a 12th-century Korean history of the Three Kingdoms, Mobon was the eldest son of Goguryeo's third king Daemusin. Although Mobon was the crown prince at the time of Daemusin's death, because of Mobon's youth, Daemusin's younger brother Minjung ascended to the throne. Mobon became king upon Minjung's death. However, in the Samguk yusa, Mobon is described as Minjung's older brother.

The Samguk sagi notes that Mobon's character was fierce and stubborn, and he incurred the resentment of the common people. In 49, he attacked the Beiping, Yuyang, Shanggu, and Taiyuan commanderies of Han dynasty, several times, but later signed a treaty with Han.

In 52, he became increasingly tyrannical, often sitting on people or using them as pillows to lie on, and if anyone moved, he would kill them. If any of his subjects tried to advise him, he would shoot them with an arrow.

In 53, he was eventually killed by Duro, an attendant who was from Mobon-won, who had become fearful of the king. Someone said to him, "Why does a brave man weep? The ancients said, 'He who nurtures us is our ruler; he who oppresses us is our enemy.' Now the King acts with cruelty and kills people; he is the enemy of the people. You should take action against him." Duro hid a knife and approached the King. The King drew him near to sit down on him, whereupon Duro pulled out the knife and stabbed him to death. The King was subsequently buried at Mobon-won, and was given the posthumous title King Mobon.

He named his son Ik the crown prince, but upon Mobon's death, there was a power struggle for the throne. He was succeeded by prince Ko Kung, a grandson of Yuri of Goguryeo.

== See also ==
- History of Korea
- Three Kingdoms of Korea
- List of Korean monarchs

Mobon of Goguryeo House of Go Born: 30 Died: 53
Regnal titles
Preceded by Minjung	King of Goguryeo; 48–53	Succeeded by Taejo
