= Prince Hodong of Goguryeo =

1st century Goguryeo Korean prince

Hodong
- Prince of Goguryeo
- Died: 32 AD; Kingdom of Goguryeo
- Wife: Princess Nakrang
- Father: Daemusin of Goguryeo
- Mother: Lady Hae

Korean name
- Hangul: 호동
- Hanja: 好童
- Revised Romanization: Hodong
- McCune–Reischauer: Hotong

Prince Hodong (Korean: 호동; Hanja: 好童; d. 11st months 32 AD (Lunar calendar)) was a Goguryeo Royal Prince as the son of King Daemusin, from Lady Hae.

== Outline ==
When Hodong, a child of Daemusin of Goguryeo, the third king of Goguryeo went Okjeo for hunting, he met Choi Ri (Korean: 최리; Hanja: 崔理) who was the king of Nakrang Kingdom. However, the kingdom's sovereignty is often disputed, which is often viewed as an independent kingdom by Korean scholars while Chinese and Japanese academic communities usually interpret the name Nakrang to be referring to Lelang Commandery.

For Hodong, Princess of Nakrang destroyed the drum and Oliphant by a sword, after that Goguryeo attacked Nakrang Kingdom. Choi Ri could not be prepared for that attack because the drum and Oliphant were destroyed and he could not know Goguryeo's invasion. He only knew that the drums and Oliphant were destroyed after Goguryeo's aggression, but there's nothing to do but surrender to Goguryeo. At that time, Choi Ri killed Princess of Nakrang who destroyed the drum and Oliphant.

Hodong was a child of Hae clan (Korean: 해씨; Hanja: 解氏) who was a stepmother of Daemusin of Goguryeo, so, the empress of Goguryeo afraid if Hodong become a crown prince by pushing aside her own son. The empress gave a slanderous report that Hodong plans rebellion to Daemusin of Goguryeo. After that Hodong committed suicide because if explain to that slander, he could leap to light of the empress's iniquity and Daemusin of Goguryeo would get anxious about it.

== In popular culture ==
=== TV series and Dramas ===
- Portrayed by Lee Mook-won in the 1964 KBS TV series Guktomalli (국토만리).
- Portrayed by Choi Won-hong and Kim Jin-woo in the 2008–2009 KBS TV series The Kingdom of the Winds (바람의 나라).
- Portrayed by Jung Kyung-ho, Yeo Jin-goo and Kang Soo-han in the 2009 SBS Television series Ja Myung Go (자명고).

=== Films ===
- Portrayed by Kim Dong-won in the 1956 Film Prince Hodong and Princess Nakrang (왕자호동과 낙랑공주).
- Portrayed by Kim Jin-kyoo in the 1962 Film The Prince Hodong (왕자 호동).
- Portrayed in the 1971 Film The Prince Hodong and The Princess Nakrang (호동 왕자와 낙랑공주).

=== Novel ===
- Portrayed in the 1942–1943 Novel series The Prince Hodong (왕자호동) by Lee Tae-joon.

=== Other ===
- Ja Myung-ko (자명고; 1947, Yoo Chi-jin).
- Dungdung Nallangdung (둥둥 낙랑둥; 1978, Choi In-hoon).
- The Prince Hodong (왕자호동).
