= Lady Hae =

- Secondary Consort ("Cha-Bi")
- Born: Unknown; State of Galsabuyeo
- Died: Unknown; Kingdom of Goguryeo
- Spouse: Go Muhyul
- Sons: Hodong (with Muhyul)
Regnal name
- Secondary Consort Hae (차비 해씨; 次妃 解氏; given during King Daemusin's reign)
- House: Hae clan (by birth)
- Father: Hae, son of King Galsa

Korean name
- Hangul: 부인 해씨
- Hanja: 夫人 解氏
- RR: Buin Haessi
- MR: Puin Haessi

Lady Hae (Korean: 부인 해씨) was a Galsabuyeo royal family member as the granddaughter of its founder and sister of its last ruler. It was said that she had a beautiful looks and therefore was favoured by King Muhyul, then honoured as Secondary Consort Hae (차비 해씨; 次妃 解氏) and had a son with him, Prince Hodong who was his favourite son. In 68 AD, her brother, King Dodu's kingdom was surrendered King Taejo while he united Galsabuyeo with Goguryeo.

== In popular culture ==
- Portrayed by Choi Jung-won in the 2008–2009 KBS TV series The Kingdom of the Winds.
