= The Kingdom of the Winds =

- Promotional poster
- Also known as: The Land of Wind
- Genre: epic; Action-adventure; History; Korean drama
- Written by: Choi Wan-kyu; Jin-ok Jeong
- Directed by: Ji Byung-Hyun; Kang Il-Soo
- Starring: Song Il-kook; Choi Jung-won; Park Gun-hyung; Jung Jin-young
- Composer: Lee Pil-ho
- Country of origin: South Korea
- Original language: Korean
- No. of seasons: 1
- No. of episodes: 36

Production
- Production location: Korea
- Running time: Wednesday & Thursday 21:55 (KST)
- Production company: Chorokbaem Media

Original release
- Network: KBS2
- Release: 10 September 2008 – 15 January 2009

Related
- Jumong

The Kingdom of the Winds, also called The Land of Wind (Korean: 바람의 나라), is a 2008 epic South Korean historical drama, broadcast on KBS2 from 10 September 2008 to 15 January 2009. It is set during the Three Kingdoms period and features fictionalized portrayals of several historical figures from that era. It was directed by Kang Il-soo, written by Choi Wan-gyu, Jung Jin-ok and Park Jin-woo and adapted from a manhwa by Kim Jin.

== Synopsis ==
While King Yuri is away fighting barbarians, the heads of tribes stage a coup against him, but he defeats them and kills the mastermind. Sang Ga, the head of the Biru tribe is spared of punishment because of his refusal to contribute in the coup. Yuri's new son is born with a grim prophecy that he will kill his family and ruin the kingdom. Yuri announces he will kill the baby to prevent the prophecy. Prince Hae Myeong disagrees; but to no avail. The baby is apparently killed in the ceremony, but Yuri gives him to Hae Myeong alive and healthy and tells him to take the baby somewhere he could grow up and live his life, naming him Muhyul (meaning "soulless"). Hae Myeong gives Muhyul to his former love Hye-Ap, who protects Jumong's tomb in the cave.

Several years later, an adult Muhyul is living a normal life with his friend Maro. In the streets of Julbon, a gang leader named Chu Balso bullies Muhyul and takes his medallion, which his sister Se Ryu gave him when saying goodbye. Hye-Ap imprisons Muhyul and Maro for leaving the cave. The cave is attacked by the black shades, special and secret forces of Buyou. Hye-Ap tells Maro to go and ask Hae Myeong, who is the governor of Julbon, for help. The shades realize that the tomb is protected by a strict fatal defense mechanism and threaten Muhyul to go and bring Jumong's sword by Hye-Ap's life. Muhyul manages to get past the traps and bring the sword as Hae Myeong and his men arrive and kill the shades. Hae Myeong takes Muhyul and Maro with him without telling the former of his true identity. The two are introduced to captain Gwi Yoo, who humiliates them during training. King Daeso invites Yuri to his palace for political friendship and the latter accepts. Having gained skills, Muhyul chases Chu Balso and his men to the borders, where they are all captured by the Buyonese soldiers. In the camp, a doctor named Yeon treats Muhyul, and he falls in love with her. Hae Myeong and his army attack the camp and rescue Muhyul, who in turn saves Chu Balso and his men. Chu Balso returns Muhyul's medallion. Daeso becomes angry for the attack and humiliates Yuri, who returns and punishes Hae Myeong by relieving him from his post. Hae Myeong and Muhyul travel to Buyou for gaining intel. They realize that the black shades are experimenting poisons on captured slaves. Muyhul gets intel of a suitable situation to attack Daeso and informs Hae Myeong, who in turn tells Yuri and they plan to attack Buyou after Daeso is killed and his country is leaderless. Chu Balso and his men are hired for the assault on Daeso, which fails and he demands Yuri to deliver Hae Myeong to him, otherwise Guguryo will be destroyed. Yuri refuses this and prepares for war, but the tribal heads demand him to deliver his son, as the Buyonese army is much more powerful than the Guguryan. Hae Myeong goes to Daeso's camp and kills himself on the latter's demand with the condition of the Buyonese army leaving Guguryo. Sang Ga's adopted son, Bae Guk attacks Hae Myeong's men, stating this to be Yuri's order. Muhyul and Maro escape, but are captured by the black shades.

One year later, Yuri has strengthened his army and formed alliances with neighbors against Buyou. In the black shades camp, Muhyul has survived several experiments by the thirst for vengeance against Yuri. The leader of the shades, who's also Yeon's father, realizes Muhyul's intentions and recruits him and Maro after testing them. After weeks of hard training, they become skilled shades. They also befriend Dojin, another talented shade. Hye-Ap, Gwi Yoo and Chu Balso try to kill Yuri before being convinced that Yuri had no part in either his son's death or the attack on his followers. Muhyul, Maro and Dojin are assigned to kill the Chinese tribute in Guguryo, ending with success. With a conspiracy staged by Sa Goo, a Buyonese authority, Daeso orders the shades to kill Yeon's father and herself. Dojin, who is also in love with Yeon, kills her father, but tells Muhyul to help her escape to Guguryo. Sa Goo reassigns Dojin abroad to get rid of him. He escapes and convinces Bae Guk to recruit him. Daeso assigns Muyhul and Maro with killing Yuri. They travel to Guguryo and Muhyul tries to kill his father before being stopped by Hye-Ap. Yuri realizes the truth about Muhyul's identity and is convinced about the prophecy. Hye-Ap persuades Muhyul of Yuri's innocence and Muhyul convinces Yuri to allow him to atone by killing Daeso, who survives by Dojin's in time warning, revealing that it was Daeso's order for Dojin to infiltrate Biru. By Dojin's help, Bae Guk travels to Buyou and forms a secret alliance with Daeso. Muhyul finds out his true identity and is introduced to the authorities by Yuri officially. They don't accept him because of the prophecy, but Muhyul convinces them to give him a chance to prove the prophecy wrong. Yuri's wife begins planning to make her own son, Yeojin, the crown-prince. Daeso holds a celebration and invites Guguryan tributes. Muhyul travels as the head of the tributes with the plan to spy and gain intel. They realize that Buyou is preparing for war. Muhyul returns and decides to ready the army.

Six months later, The Buyonese army starts marching towards Guguryo and Muhyul gathers the army and confronts them, but the Buyonese army wins the battle by its special chariots. Muhyul finds a countermeasure to the chariots and wins the next battle. Daeso orders the army to retreat. The victory becomes a political success for Muhyul and after Yeojin's withdrawal from the campaign, Muhyul is announced the crown-prince. He marries a maid from Biru according to law, but refuses to sleep with her, as his heart is still with Yeon. Bae Guk, Yeojin's mother and Daeso stage a coup against Yuri and Muhyul. Sang Ga is killed by the black shades. The loyalists retreat to Julbon. In the civil war, Yuri and Yeojin are killed. Muhyul gains the upper hand by making a division between Bae Guk and Daeso, with the latter leaving Guguryo and the former being defeated and exiled to a labor camp. Muhyul becomes the king. His wife helps Dojin return Yeon to Buyou. He gets angry after realizing that she's pregnant from Muhyul.

Two years later, Muhyul has added many regions to his kingdom and Yeon has married Dojin and raised Hudong, Muhyul's son. Dojin proves Sa Goo's conspiracy, resulting in the latter's execution and the former becoming the presumptive crown-prince; as Daeso has no son. The final war starts between Guguryo and Buyou in which the latter is defeated and dissolved. Daeso is killed and Dojin kills himself before returning a dying Yeon to Muhyul.

Five years later, Muhyul tells Hudong about Yeon.

== Cast ==
=== Main ===
- Song Il-kook as Prince Muhyul, later King Daemusin
  - Choi Won-hong as young Prince Muhyul
  - Park Gun-woo as teenage Prince Muhyul
- Choi Jung-won as Princess Yeon, later Lady Hae
- Choi Won-hong as Prince Hodong
  - Kim Jin-woo as young Prince Hodong
- Park Gun-hyung as Prince Dojin
- Jung Jin-young as King Yuri

=== Supporting ===
==== People in Goguryeo ====
- Lee Jong-won as Prince Haemyeong, Muhyul's older brother
- Park Sang-wook as Goe-yoo
- Oh Yoon-ah as Chief Decorator Hye-ap
- Kim Jae-wook as Chu Bal-so
- Jang Tae-sung as Ma-ro, Muhyul's friend
- Kim Sang-ho as Ma-hwang
- Kim Hye-seong as Prince Yeojin, Muhyul's younger half-brother
- Im Jung-eun as Princess Seryu
  - Jung Da-bin as young Princess Seryu
- Kim Myung-soo as Gu-chu
- Kim Won-jong as a Prime Minister

==== People in Buyeo ====
- Han Jin-hee as King Daeso
- Son Byung-ho as Tak-Rok
- Park Jung-hak as Sa-Gu
- Kim Min-chan as Maeng-Gwang

==== People in Jegahoe ====
- Kim Byung-ki as Sang-Ga, Head of Biru Tribe
- Kim Kyu-chul as Myeong-Jin
- Jung Sung-mo as Bae-Geuk

=== Others ===
- Kim Won-hyo as Gong-Chan
- Lee Si-young as Yeon-Hwa
- Kim Jung-hwa as Princess Yiji
- Kim Hye-ri as Lady Miyu, Yeojin's mother
- Choi Woon-kyo as Yeon-Bi
- Kim Kyung-ryong as Gwi-Jok
- Kim Joo-young as Hwanna Clan chieftain
- Kim Seung-wook as An-Seung

Themes: Alive Even After Death by Wheesung

== Awards and nominations ==
Year	Award	Category	Recipient	Result
2008	KBS Drama Awards	Top Excellence Award, Actor	Song Il-gook	Won
2008	KBS Drama Awards	Best Couple Award	Song Il-gook and Choi Jung-won	Won
2008	KBS Drama Awards	Best Couple Award	Park Gun-hyung and Choi Jung-won	Nominated
2008	KBS Drama Awards	Best Couple Award	Song Il-gook and Kim Jung-hwa	Nominated
2008	KBS Drama Awards	Excellence Award, Actor in a Miniseries	Jung Jin-young	Won
2008	KBS Drama Awards	Excellence Award, Actress in a Miniseries	Choi Jung-won	Won
2008	KBS Drama Awards	Netizen Award, Actor	Jung Jin-young	Nominated
2008	KBS Drama Awards	Netizen Award, Actor	Park Gun-hyung	Nominated
2008	KBS Drama Awards	Netizen Award, Actress	Oh Yoon-ah	Nominated

== International broadcast ==
In Japan the drama aired on cable channel BS-Fuji beginning October 15, 2009 on Wednesdays. The drama was also aired on Japanese cable channel KNTV from July 17 to August 27, 2011. In Iran the drama first aired on Channel 3 then after a few years on Tamasha and Namayesh Channels. In Thailand the drama aired on Channel 3 beginning July 12, 2009 on Sundays. Repeat telecast in 2012.

In Tanzania the drama was aired on ITV from November, 2010 to March 2012 on Wednesday to Friday from 10pm to 11pm. Also was repeated in 2012 on Capital TV.
