= Princess of Nangnang (1st century) =

Nakrang princess (died 32 AD)

Princess Nakrang
- Princess of Nakrang Kingdom
- Died: 32 AD; Nakrang Kingdom
- Husband: Prince Hodong
- Father: Choi-Ri

- Princess of Nangnang
- Hangul: 낙랑공주
- Hanja: 樂浪公主
- Revised Romanization: Nangnang Gongju
- McCune–Reischauer: Nangnang Kongju

According to the ancient Korean record of Samguk Sagi, the Princess of Nakrang (Korean: 낙랑공주; Hanja: 樂浪公主; ? – c.32) was a daughter of Choi Ri (Korean: 최리; Hanja: 崔理) who was the king of Nakrang Kingdom. However, the kingdom's sovereignty is often disputed, which is often viewed as an independent kingdom by Korean scholars while Chinese and Japanese academic communities usually interpret the name Nakrang to be referring to Lelang Commandery.

== Outline ==
When Hodong, a child of Daemusin of Goguryeo, the third king of Goguryeo went Okjeo for hunting, he met Choi Ri, the king of Nakrang Kingdom and they decided welcome his daughter Princess of Nakrang as a wife of Hodong. Daemusin of Goguryeo was planning to attack Nakrang Kingdom, and asked Hodong to destroy the drum and oliphant that automatically notify people when enemy attack the country. Hodong send a messenger and ask Princess of Nakrang to destroy the drum and Oliphant.

For Hodong, Princess of Nakrang destroyed the drum and Oliphant by a sword, after that Goguryeo attacked Nakrang Kingdom. Choi Ri could not be prepared for that attack because the drum and Oliphant were destroyed and he could not know Goguryeo’s invasion. He only knew that the drums and Oliphant were destroyed after Goguryeo’s aggression, but there’s nothing to do but surrender to Goguryeo. At that time, Choi Ri killed Princess of Nakrang who destroyed the drum and oliphant.

== In popular culture ==
- Portrayed by Park Min-young and Jin Ji-hee in the 2009 SBS Television series Ja Myung Go.
