= Nangnang Kingdom =

Theorized ancient kingdom in Korea

- Hangul: 낙랑국
- Hanja: 樂浪國
- RR: Nangnangguk
- MR: Nangnangguk

Nangnang Kingdom (Korean: 낙랑국; Hanja: 樂浪國) was a kingdom located in the northwestern part of the Korean Peninsula according to Samguk sagi. The kingdom's independence, however, is debated. According to the ancient Korean record of Samguk Sagi, the King of Nangnang named Choi Ri met the Prince Hodong of Goguryeo and let him marry his daughter, the Princess of Nakrang. When Prince Hodong asked the princess to break drums and horns in the Nangnang's armory to prevent the kingdom's guards from alerting the attack by Goguryeo, the princess followed Hodong's instructions, leading to Nangnang being conquered by Goguryeo.

== Dispute regarding independence ==
The view regarding Nangnang's independence is disputed. While Chinese and Japanese scholars claim that the name Nangnang actually refers to the Lelang Commandery of China's Han dynasty and Choi Ri was Lelang's governor rather than a King, Korean scholars often view Nangnang as an independent kingdom.

=== Korean perspective ===
Korean scholars tend to view Nangnang as an independent kingdom given that the ancient Korean record Samguk Sagi referred to Nangnang as a kingdom and Choi Ri as Nangnang's King (樂浪王). They also point out the lack of Chinese record mentioning Choi Ri as the official of Lelang. It is also noted that Goguryeo must had attacked Lelang Commandry during the time period mentioned in Samguk Sagi if the name Nangnang indeed referred to Lelang. However, there is no record of such war between Goguryeo and Lelang at the mentioned time, suggesting that Nangnang was possibly a different state than Lelang.

Because the record of Samguk Sagi also suggested that Choi Ri and Hodong met near modern-day Hamhung, some South Korean scholars speculate Nangnang to be a kingdom centered around Hamhung, possibly related to the several states that briefly evolved and lived after the abolishment of Lelang Commandery, before being absorbed by Goguryeo.

North Korean academia fully assert that Nangnang was an independent country that existed in modern-day Pyongyang and composed Mahan confederacy, arguing Lelang Commandery to be actually located near Liao River of Liaodong Peninsula. The North Korean academia also speculate the Chinese-style ruins and relics found in Pyongyang to be either the war bounties, introduced through trade, or even forged. They also emphasize that the Korean characteristics found in the ruins and relics should not be negated.

=== Chinese and Japanese perspective ===
The Chinese and Japanese scholars state that the Nangnang Kingdom was just another name used to refer to the Lelang Commandery of the Chinese Han dynasty. This perspective claims that it was referred to with the name of a kingdom because the residents were autonomous but were ultimately controlled by the Chinese commandery. The King of Nangnang was also interpreted to be the same title as the governor of the commandery.

Kenji Takahisa (Professor of Korean history at Senshu University) mentions “In that theory, there were Nangnang Kingdom which founded by old Korean ethnic group in Pyongyang, not Lelang Commandery of Han. However, it is difficult to prove this theory because there are many tombs influenced by Han culture found in Pyongyang, while there were not related archaeological and historical resources related to Lelang Commandery in Liaoning area.”

Shouei Mishina criticized the claim that Nangnang Kingdom was different from the Lelang Commandery and said that it ignored the situation of Lelang Commandery of the Eastern Han dynasty.
