= Wando (island) =

Island in Wando County, South Korea

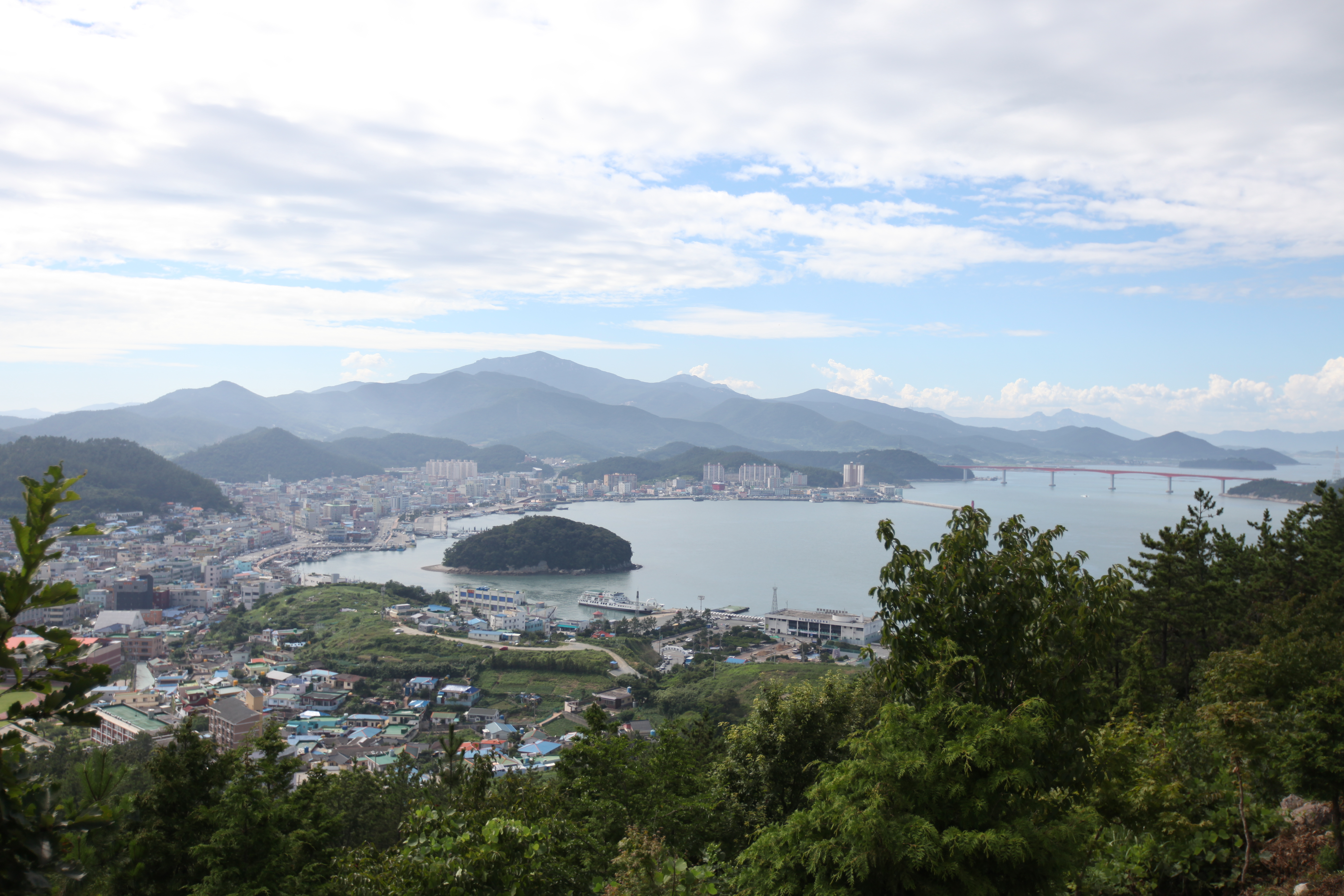

Korean name
- Hangul: 완도
- Hanja: 莞島
- RR: Wando
- MR: Wando

Wando is an island in Wando County, Jeonnam-Gwangju, South Korea.
