= Buyeo =

c. 2nd century BCE to 494 CE kingdom in north-east China

Buyeo 夫餘 (Korean) (Hanja) 부여 (Hangul) 夫餘/扶餘 (Chinese)
- c. 2nd century BCE–494 CE
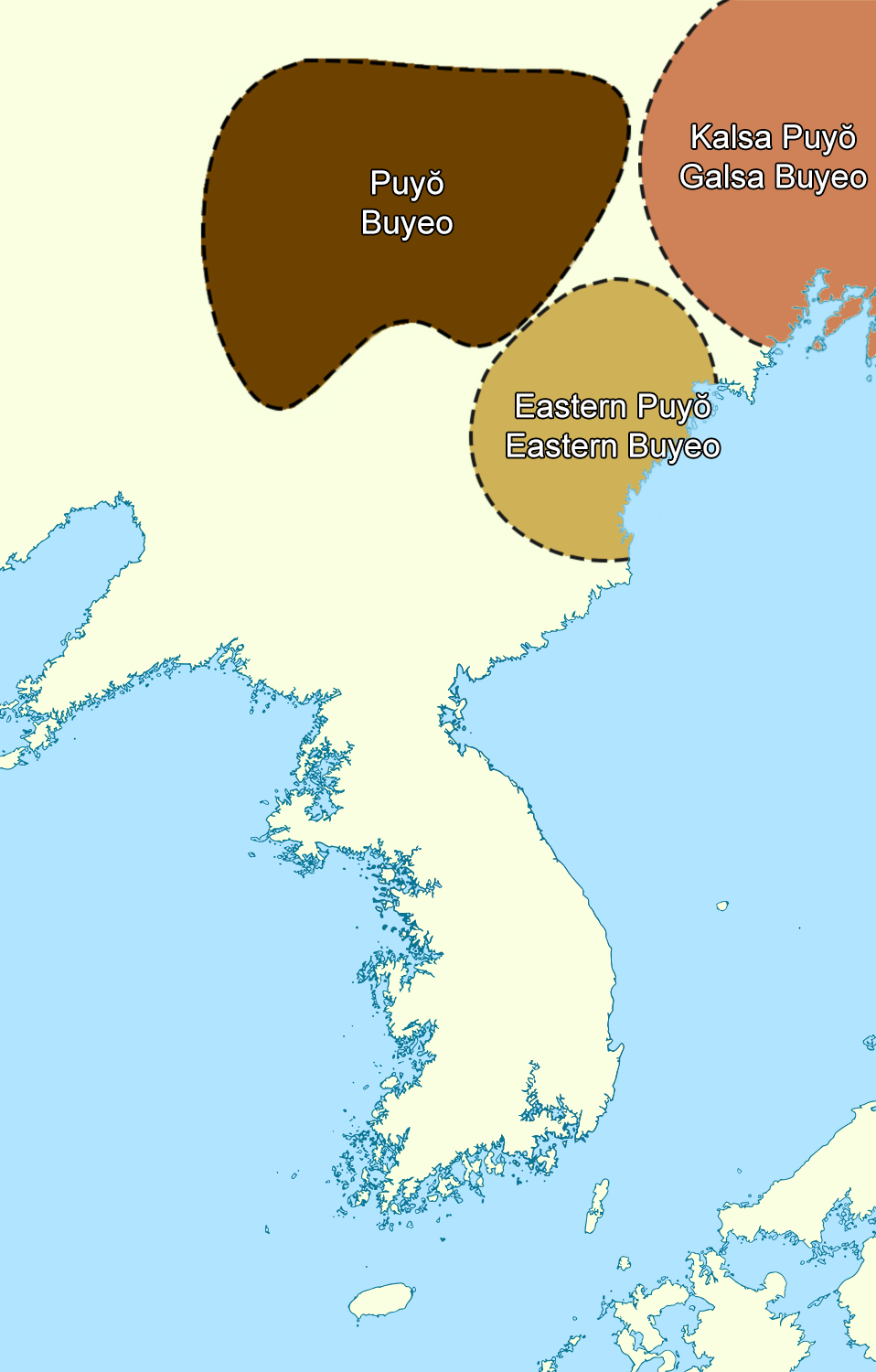
- Map of Buyeo Map of Eastern Buyeo Map of Galsa Buyeo
- Capital: Buyeo
- Common languages: Buyeo, Classical Chinese (literary)
- Ethnic groups: Yemaek
- Religion: Shamanism
- Government: Monarchy
- King
  - ?–?: Hae Mo-su?
  - 86–48 BCE: Buru
  - ?–494 CE: Jan (孱) (last)
- Historical era: Ancient
  - Established: c. 2nd century BCE
  - Disestablished: 494 CE
Preceded by
Yemaek
Okjeo
Succeeded by
Eastern Buyeo
Goguryeo
Paekche
- Today part of: China, Russia

Chinese name
- Traditional Chinese: 夫餘
- Simplified Chinese: 夫余
Transcriptions
Standard Mandarin
- Hanyu Pinyin: Fūyú

Korean name
- Hangul: 부여
- Hanja: 夫餘
Transcriptions
- Revised Romanization: Buyeo
- McCune–Reischauer: Puyŏ

Alternative Korean name
- Hangul: 북부여
- Hanja: 北夫餘
Transcriptions
- Revised Romanization: Bukbuyeo
- McCune–Reischauer: Pukpuyŏ

Buyeo or Puyŏ (Korean: 부여; Hanja: 夫餘; [pu.jʌ]), also rendered as Fuyu (Chinese: 夫餘/扶餘) in Chinese, was an ancient kingdom that was centered in northern Manchuria in modern-day northeast China. It had deep ties to the Yemaek people, who are considered to be the ancestors of modern Koreans. It is also called Northern Buyeo (Korean: 북부여; Hanja: 北夫餘) according to its founding legend.

Historically, both Goguryeo and Paekche, two of the Three Kingdoms of Korea, considered themselves Buyeo's successors. In addition, it is also considered a major predecessor of the Korean kingdoms of Eastern Buyeo, and Galsa Buyeo.

== History ==
=== Founding legend ===
The legendary founder of the Buyeo kingdom was Hae Mo-su, the "Dongmyeong of Buyeo" which literally means "Holy King of Buyeo". Hae Mo-su is said to be the father to famous historical figures in Korean history. Famously, Dongmyeong, the founder of Goguryeo, is described as the son of Hae Mo-su and Lady Yuhwa who was the daughter of Habaek. He was also the father to Hae Buru, the founder of Eastern Buyeo and another son of Lady Yuhwa as well as brother to Dongmyeong, who carried his father's kingdom's name to his newly founded kingdom.

However, the legendary accounts are considered mystifying due to different sources positing different genealogies. According to the Samguk yusa, it is said that Dongmyeong of Goguryeo and Buru of Buyeo were both sons of Lady Yuhwa, but their fathers were different, Dongmyeong being Hae Mo-su's offspring while Buru being Tan'gun's. The author of the Samguk yusa, Il-yeon, suspected that therefore, the two individuals were half-brothers.

The Samguk sagi by Kim Pusik offered a completely different story with Dongmyeong being a child that was born from an egg after his mother, Lady Yuhwa, was discovered/rescued by Geumwa of Buyeo and was touched by sunlight. It is said that Geumwa was the son of Buru which makes him the grandson of Hae Mo-su, and Dongmyeong being his adopted son, becoming Hae Mo-su's great grandson. However, since the Samguk yusa and Samguk sagi were created by different authors with different intentions, the general consensus is that the founding story is merely a legend and should not be taken literally.

=== Early period ===
The exact founding year of Buyeo is unclear. However, it most likely coexisted with Old Chosŏn (2333[?]–108 BCE) and the Jin state (4th–2nd century BCE), and was founded prior to the formation of the Four Commanderies of Han which happened after the fall of Old Chosŏn in the 2nd century BCE by the Han dynasty of China. It is speculaterd to have emerged from the Bronze Age polities of the ancient Seodansan (선도산; present-day Xituanshan) and Liangquan (凉泉; present-day Liaodong) archaeological cultures in the context of trade with various ancient Chinese polities. In particular was the state of Yan which introduced iron technology to Manchuria and the Korean peninsula after its conquest of Liaodong in the early third century BCE.

Ethnically, the inhabitants of the kingdom were the same as Old Chosŏn, being the Yemaek people, but different from the Jin state, as its successor polities' inhabitants were said to be closer to the people of Wa (Japan) according to the Book of Wei - Volume 30. It likely remained that way until the end of the Samhan period, and the beginning of the Three Kingdoms period of Korea, where it is said that the indigenous people (Yemaek people) of Old Chosŏn founded southern kingdoms such as Silla, which hints at a continuous migration from Old Chosŏn–Buyeo (and possibly Eastern Buyeo) to the southern part of the Korean peninsula.

=== Relations with Chinese dynasties ===
In the later Western Han (202 BCE–9 CE), Buyeo established close ties with the Xuantu Commandery, one of Four Commanderies of Han, according to volume 85 of the Book of the Later Han (Treatise on the Dongyi), although it proceeded to becoming a nominal tributary-state and practical ally of Eastern Han in 49 CE. This was advantageous to the Han as an ally in the northeast would curb the threats of the Xianbei in western Manchuria and eastern Mongolia and Goguryeo in the Liaodong region and the northern Korean peninsula. The Buyeo elites also sought this arrangement as it legitimized their rule and gave them better access to Han's prestige trade goods.

During a period of turmoil in China's northeast, Buyeo attacked some of Eastern Han's holdings in 111, but relations were mended in 120 and thus a military alliance was arranged. Two years later, Buyeo sent troops to the Xuantu commandery to prevent it from being destroyed by Goguryeo when it sent reinforcement to break the siege of the commandery seat. In 167 CE, Buyeo attacked the Xuantu commandery but was defeated. When Emperor Xian (189–220 CE) ruled Eastern Han, Buyeo was reclassified as a tributary of the Liaodong Commandery of Han.

In the early 3rd century, Gongsun Du, a Chinese warlord in Liaodong, supported Buyeo to counter the Xianbei in the north and Goguryeo in the east. After destroying the Gongsun family, the northern Chinese state of Cao Wei sent Guanqiu Jian to attack Goguryeo. Part of the expeditionary force led by Wang Qi (Korean: 왕기; Hanja: 王頎), the Grand Administrator of the Xuantu Commandery, pursued the Guguryeo court eastward through Okjeo and into the lands of the Yilou. On their return journey they were welcomed as they passed through the land of Buyeo. It brought detailed information of the kingdom to China.

=== Invasions ===
In 285 the Murong tribe of the Xianbei, led by Murong Hui, invaded Buyeo, pushing King Uiryeo (依慮) to suicide, and forcing the relocation of the court to Okjeo. Many Buyeo people were taken as slaves and probably ended up in the Murong capital in modern Chaoyang, judging by number of late 3rd century and early 4th century tombs there with Buyeo characteristics. The king's son and younger brother fled to Okjeo. Considering its friendly relationship with the Jin dynasty, Emperor Wu helped King Uira (依羅) revive Buyeo. The Book of Jin states that in 286, the succeeding King Ŭira asked the Commandant of the Eastern Yi, He Kan, to assist Buyeo people in returning to their kingdom. He sent the Protector-general, Jia Chen, to protect Ŭira and establish him as king. Chen intercepted the Murong general Sun Ding and beheaded him, driving back the Murong forces, and restoring Buyeo. According to accounts in the Zizhi Tongjian and the Book of Jin, Murong Hui's forces continued to attack Buyeo and forced the Buyeo to relocate several times in the 4th century. They seized Buyeo people and sold them as slaves to the Chinese. The Jin emperor ordered for the Buyeo slaves to be redeemed using government property and for the sale of Buyeo slaves to be prohibited. There is no reason given for the attack or evidence that the Murong had any prior contact with Buyeo. Byington suggests that having gone into decline, Buyeo presented itself as an easy target for manpower, wealth, and technology.

Goguryeo's attack sometime before 347 caused further decline (Note: According to the entry on Murong Huang's attack on Buyeo in 347, Buyeo's decline was attributed to Paekche.). Having lost its stronghold on the Ashi River (within modern Harbin), Buyeo moved southwestward to Nong'an. Around February 347, (Note: The Zizhi Tongjian dated Murong Huang's attack on Buyeo to the 1st month of the 3rd year of the Yonghe era of the reign of Emperor Mu of Jin; the month corresponds to 28 Jan to 26 Feb 347 in the Julian calendar.) Buyeo was attacked by Murong Huang of the Former Yan, and King Hyeon (玄) was captured. Originally, the Murong Xianbei created the Yan states, with five states emerging during the Sixteen Kingdoms period, and thus were able to do so.

=== Demise ===
Goguryeo occupied Buyeo's territory and a group of Buyeo people known as the Damolou (大莫婁) or Damolu (大莫盧) fled north to establish themselves around the Songhua River. They were situated north of the Wuji (Mulgil) Mohe people (Malgal) and east of the Shiwei people. They seem to have lingered around the modern Harbin area under the influence of Goguryeo. Buyeo paid tribute to Northern Wei in 457–8 and accompanied a Wuji mission to Wei in 486. The mission in 458 explained that the kings of Buyeo were under Goguryeo tutelage and had been granted some degree of autonomy, although no further missions to Wei were recorded. Goguryeo's occupation of former Buyeo territory is attested by archaeological evidence in the vicinity of Jilin such as Goguryeo roof tiles, pottery, tombs, and earthworks. In the mid-6th century, Buyeo was incorporated into the Goguryeo state cult in the form of a wooden statue in the likness of the founder's mother which represented the "Puyŏ Spirit".

According to the Samguk sagi, in 494, the king of Buyeo and his family fled to Goguryeo. The Book of Wei states that in 504, the king of Goguryeo told the Wei emperor that he could no longer send tributes of gold because that gold had come from Buyeo, and the Buyeo had been expelled by the Wuji. Archeological evidence in the area formerly occupied by Buyeo in modern Jilin confirms that a cultural layer associated with the Mohe people overlays the Buyeo layer and a third Bronze Age layer. According to Mark E. Byington, archaeological evidence supports the theory that the Mohe moved south and occupied the central and eastern regions of modern Jilin in the late 5th century. The Mohe who settled in Buyeo territory came to be known as the Sumo, and are to some degree the cultural composite of the Mohe and Buyeo survivors. The Old Book of Tang records that in 690, the Sumo Mohe were called the "Fuyu Mohe". Fuyu (浮渝) is a variant transcription of Buyeo (扶餘).

The Book of Northern Qi records two tribute missions from Damolou in 567 and 569 but the History of the Northern Dynasties completed in 659 notes that contact between Damolou and China had lapsed. The New Book of Tang records a final tribute mission by Damolou in 723 along with the Dagou (Shiwei) people. According to the New Book, the Damolou claimed to be descendants of Northern Buyeo who fled to the Na River (Nen River). Damolou disappears from history after 723. According to Byington, they were likely assimilated into the rising Khitans and Parhae.

=== Legacy ===
Many ancient historical records indicate the "Jolbon Buyeo" (Korean: 졸본부여; Hanja: 卒本夫餘), apparently referring to the incipient Goguryeo or its capital city. In 37 BCE, Dongmyeong became the first king of Goguryeo. Dongmyeong went on to conquer Okjeo, Dongye, and Haengin, regaining some of Buyeo and former territories of Old Chosŏn.

The name of the kingdom was later incorporated into the ruling class of Paekche (descendants of Goguryeo, and thus Buyeo) with their clan name being called the "Buyeo clan".

== Culture ==
According to Chapter 30 "Description of the Eastern Archerians, Dongyi" in the Chinese Records of the Three Kingdoms (3rd century), the Buyeo were agricultural people who occupied the northeastern lands in Manchuria (North-East China) beyond the great walls. The aristocratic rulers subject to the king bore the title ka (加) and were distinguished from each other by animal names, such as the dog ka and horse ka. Four kas existed in Buyeo, which were horse ka, cow ka, pig ka, and dog ka, and ka is presumed to be of similar origin with the title khan. The ka system was similarly adopted in Goguryeo.

Buyeo is north of the Long Wall, a thousand li distant from Xuantu; it is contiguous with Goguryeo on the south, with the Eumnu on the east and the Xianbei on the west, while to its north is the Ruo River. It covers an area some two thousand li square, and its households number eight myriads. Its people are sedentary, possessing houses, storehouses, and prisons. With their many tumuli and broad marshes, theirs is the most level and open of the Eastern Dongyi archerian territories. Their land is suitable for cultivation of the five grains; they do not produce the five fruits. Their people are coarsely big; by temperament strong and brave, assiduous and generous, they are not prone to brigandage... For their dress within their state they favor white; they have large sleeves, gowns, and trousers, and on their feet they wear leather sandals... The people of their state are good at raising domestic animals; they also produce famous horses, red jade, sables, and beautiful pearls... For weapons they have bows, arrows, knives, and shields; each household has its own armorer. The elders of the state speak of themselves as alien refugees of long ago. The forts they build are round and have a resemblance to prisons. Old and young, they sing when walking along the road whether it be day or night; all day long the sound of their voice never ceases... When facing the enemy the several Ka themselves do battle; the lower households carry provisions for them to eat and drink.

— Records of the Three Kingdoms, 30

The same text states that the Buyeo language was similar to those of its southern neighbours Goguryeo and Ye, and that the language of Okjeo was only slightly different from them. Based on this account, Ki-Moon Lee grouped the four languages as the Puyŏ languages, contemporaneous with the Han languages of the Samhan confederacies in southern Korea.

The earliest mentions of the Korean practice of wearing minbok (white hanbok for daily use) are also from this source. The text reads:

『在國衣尙白、白布大袂、袍・袴、履革鞜。』

"In Buyeo, white clothing is revered, so they wear wide-sleeved dopo and baji made from white linens, as well as leather shoes."

The practice of wearing white clothes is believed to have been carried over by their descendants.

== Language ==
There is no scholarly consensus on the classification of the languages spoken by the inhabitants of Buyeo, with theories including Japonic, Amuric, and a separate branch of macro-Tungusic.

According to the Records of the Three Kingdoms, the Buyeo language was similar to those of Goguryeo and Ye, and the language of Okjeo was only slightly different from them.

== Law ==
Buyeo had a law that makes the thief reimburse the price that is equivalent to twelve times of the original amount the person stole, and had an eye to eye approach in terms of law.

== Influence ==
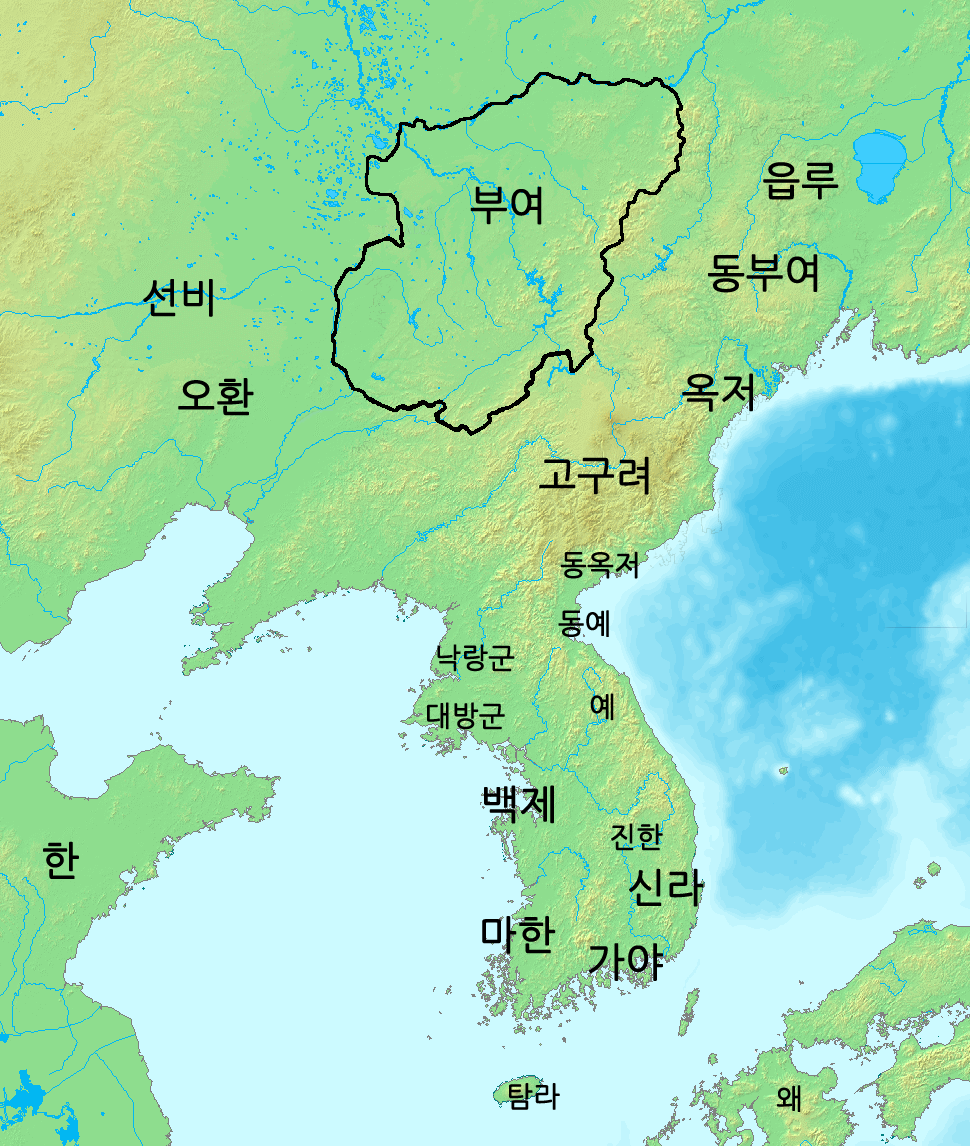
Buyeo location

In the 1930s, Chinese historian Jin Yufu (金毓黻) developed a linear model of descent for the people of Manchuria and northern Korea, from the kingdoms of Buyeo, Goguryeo, and Paekche, to the modern Korean nationality. Later historians of Northeast China built upon this influential model.

Goguryeo and Paekche, two of the Three Kingdoms of Korea, considered themselves successors of Buyeo. King Onjo, the founder of Paekche, is said to have been a son of King Dongmyeong, founder of Goguryeo. Paekche officially changed its name to "Southern Buyeo (Korean: 남부여; Hanja: 南夫餘; RR: Nambuyeo)" in 538. Goryeo also considered itself a descendant of Buyeo through their direct ancestral ties with Goguryeo and Paekche. This is seen in their representation of palace names that were named after former kingdoms that were considered their forefathers.

== See also ==
- History of Manchuria
- History of Korea
- Eastern Buyeo
- Galsa Buyeo
- Goguryeo
- Paekche

== Bibliography ==
- Byington, Mark E. (2007), "Control or Conquer? Kogury's Relations with States and Peoples in Manchuria", Journal of Northeast Asian History, 4 (1)
- Byington, Mark E. (2016), The Ancient State of Puyŏ in Northeast Asia: Archaeology and Historical Memory, Cambridge (Massachusetts) and London: Harvard University Asia Center, ISBN 978-0-674-73719-8
- Lee, Peter H. (1993), Sourcebook of Korean Civilization 1, Columbia University Press, ISBN 978-0-231-07912-9
- Lee, Ki-Moon; Ramsey, S. Robert (2011), A History of the Korean Language, Cambridge University Press, ISBN 978-1-139-49448-9
- McBride, Richard (2024), The Three Kingdoms of Korea: Lost Civilizations
