= Galsa Buyeo =

Ancient kingdom in Manchuria

Galsa Buyeo 曷思夫餘 갈사부여
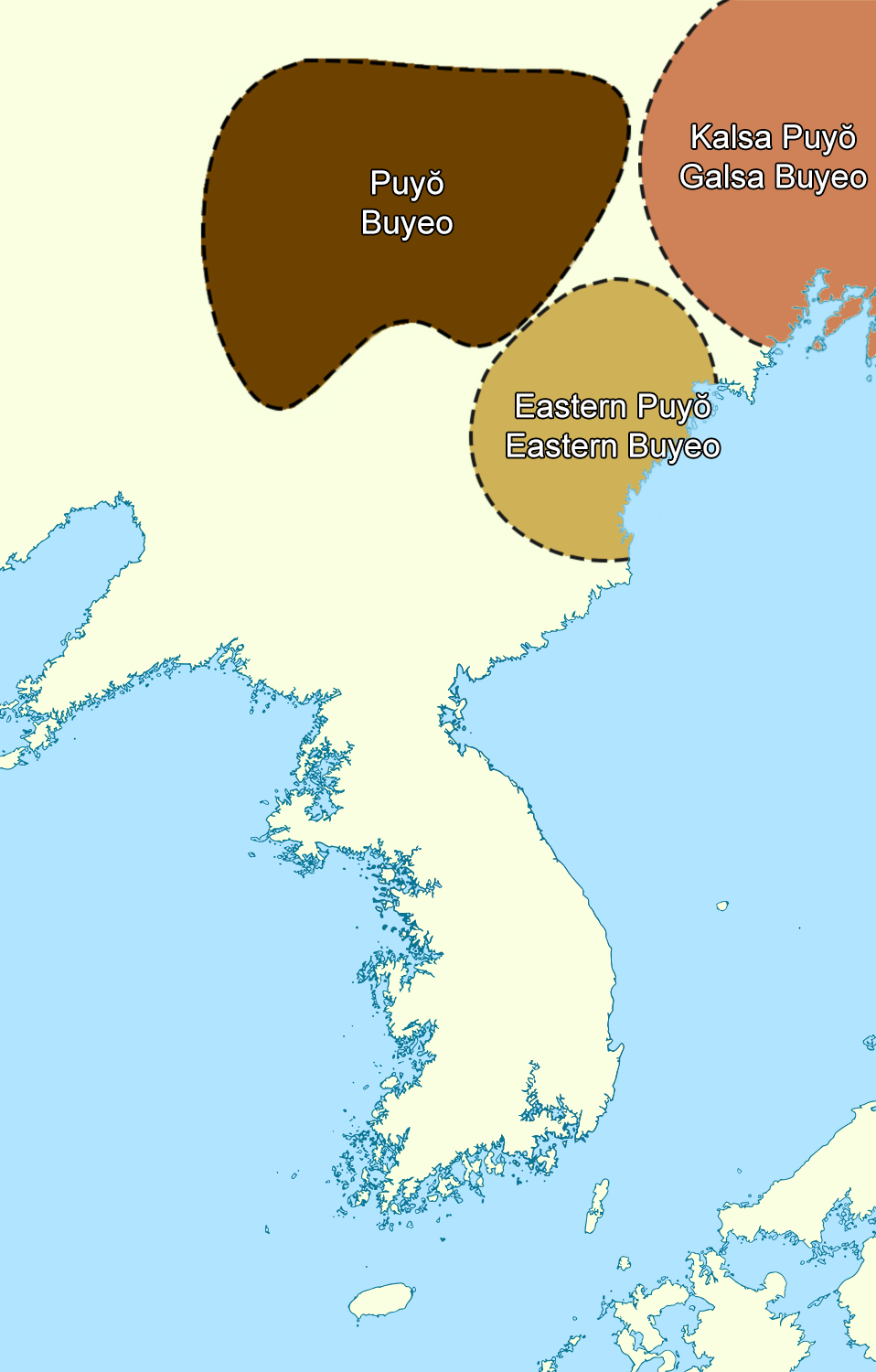
- Map of Buyeo Map of Eastern Buyeo Map of Galsa Buyeo
- Status: Rump state of Buyeo
- Common languages: Buyeo language
- Ethnic groups: Yemaek
- Government: Monarchy
- King
  - ?–?: King of Galsa (first)
  - ?–?: Unnamed king
  - ?–68CE: Dodu (last)
- Historical era: Ancient
Preceded by	Succeeded by
Eastern Buyeo; Haedu	Goguryeo
- Today part of: China; Russia

Chinese name
- Traditional Chinese: 曷思夫餘
- Simplified Chinese: 曷思夫余
Transcriptions
Standard Mandarin
- Hanyu Pinyin: Hésī Fūyú

Korean name
- Hangul: 갈사부여
- Hanja: 曷思夫餘
Transcriptions
- Revised Romanization: Galsa Buyeo
- McCune–Reischauer: Kalsa Puyŏ

Alternative Korean name
- Hangul: 갈사국
- Hanja: 曷思國
Transcriptions
- Revised Romanization: Galsaguk
- McCune–Reischauer: Kalsaguk

Galsa Buyeo or Kalsa Puyŏ (Korean: 갈사부여; Hanja: 曷思夫餘), also rendered as Galsa-guk (Korean: 갈사국; Hanja: 曷思國), and Hesi Fuyu (Chinese: 曷思夫餘) in Chinese, was an ancient kingdom founded by an unnamed king of Eastern Buyeo.

== History ==
According to the Samguk sagi, the first king of Galsa (unnamed; sometimes referred to as "King Galsa"), who was then the prince of Eastern Buyeo, feared that his home kingdom would fall into ruins after the assassination of his older brother Daeso in 22 CE.

He migrated to the "Galsa River (Korean: 갈사수; Hanja: 曷思水; RR: Galsasu)" with 100 followers. The Galsa River, believed to be near the "Amnok Valley (Korean: 압록곡; Hanja: 鴨綠谷; RR: Amnokgok)" (not to be confused with Amnok River, also known as the Yalu River), was the territory of an existing kingdom called "Haedu (Korean: 해두국; Hanja: 海頭國; RR: Haeduguk)" where its king frequently visited to hunt.

After noticing the king of Haedu arriving at the valley, it is said that the prince assassinated the king and settled near the Galsa River with his followers, subjugating the previous Haedu kingdom and absorbing its territory. The newly founded kingdom was named "Galsa Buyeo" after the name of the river it was located in, and the kingdom the prince originated from.

It is believed that the kingdom persisted even after its home kingdom of Eastern Buyeo fell to Goguryeo. In fact, Galsa Buyeo was originally on good terms with Goguryeo, to the point where the country was fairly independent. However, in 68 CE, King Dodu (Korean: 도두; Hanja: 都頭; RR: Dodu) of Galsa Buyeo surrendered to Taejo of Goguryeo where he received the respectable bureaucratic position of "U-dae (優台)". His new position is believed to have acted as the head of his kinship, likely the people of the previous Galsa Buyeo.

== Royalty ==
Kings of Galsa Buyeo
First King	Prince of Eastern Buyeo and brother of Daeso. Unnamed.
Second King	Son of the first king and father to King Dodu. Unnamed.
King Dodu	Last king of Galsa Buyeo. Son of the second king.

The country had three kings with the name of the first and the second king being unknown.

== See also ==
- Buyeo
- Eastern Buyeo
