= Eastern Buyeo =

Kingdom in northern Korea (86 BCE – 22 CE)

Eastern Buyeo 東夫餘 (Korean) (Hanja) 동부여 (Hangul) 東夫餘/東扶餘 (Chinese)
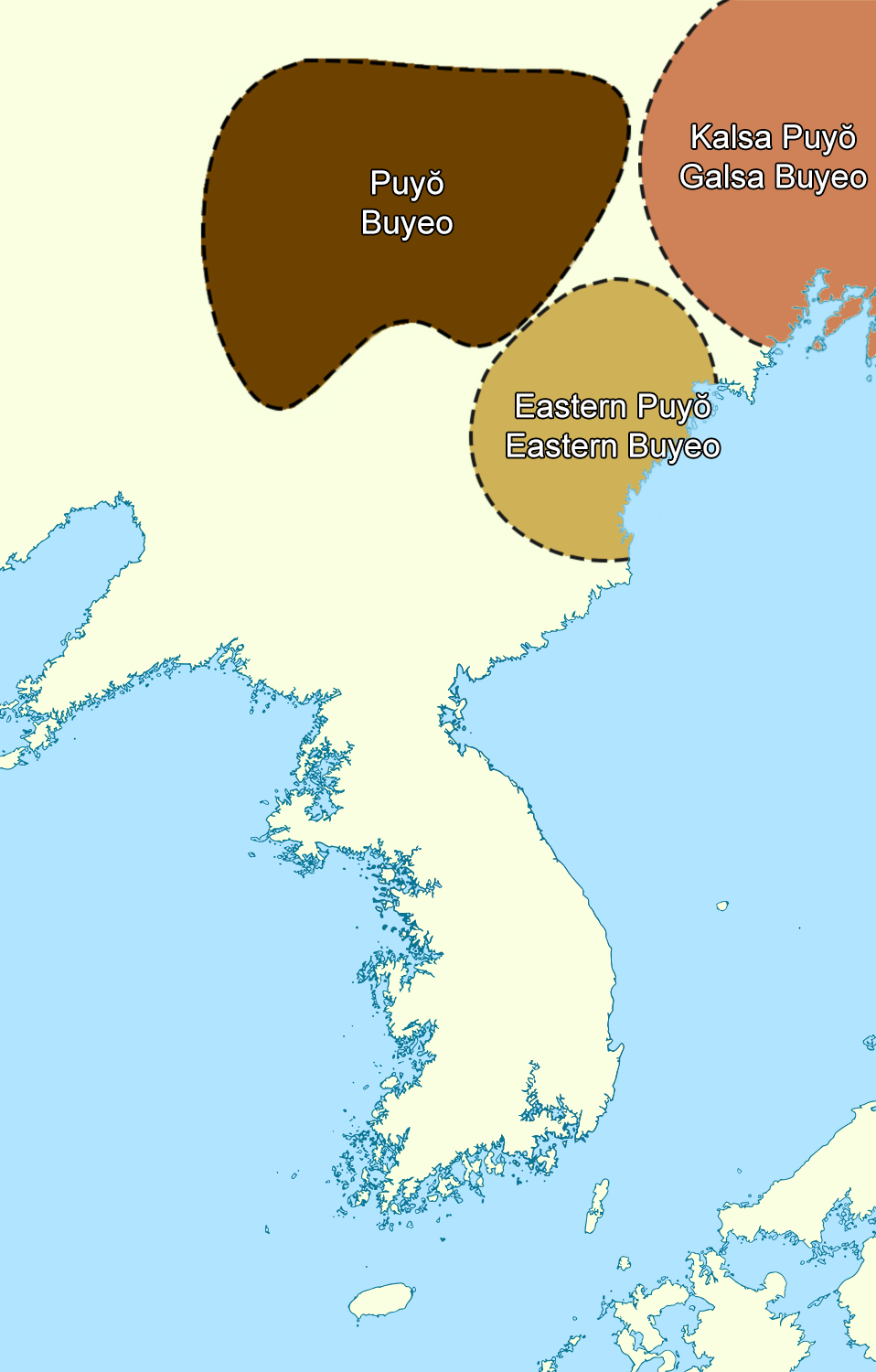
- Map of Buyeo Map of Eastern Buyeo Map of Galsa Buyeo
- Common languages: Buyeo
- Government: Monarchy
- King
  - 86–48 BCE: Buru (first)
  - 48–7 BCE: Geumwa
  - 7 BCE–22 CE: Daeso (last?)
- Historical era: Ancient
Preceded by	Succeeded by
Buyeo	Goguryeo; Galsa Buyeo
- Today part of: China; North Korea

Chinese name
- Traditional Chinese: 東夫餘
- Simplified Chinese: 东夫余
Transcriptions
Standard Mandarin
- Hanyu Pinyin: Dōng Fūyú

Korean name
- Hangul: 동부여
- Hanja: 東夫餘
Transcriptions
- Revised Romanization: Dongbuyeo
- McCune–Reischauer: Tongbuyŏ

Eastern Buyeo or Eastern Puyŏ (Korean: 동부여; Hanja: 東夫餘; [toŋbujʌ]), also rendered as Eastern Fuyu (Chinese: 東夫餘/東扶餘) in Chinese, was an ancient kingdom that developed from Northern Buyeo, until it was conquered by Goguryeo. According to the Samguk sagi, it was established when Buru of Buyeo moved the capital eastward to the sea.

== History ==
=== Founding legend ===
According to the Samguk sagi and other historical accounts such as the Samguk yusa, the kingdom of Eastern Buyeo originated from Northern Buyeo, and relocated to the land near to Okjeo.

The founder, Hae Buru, is said to be the son of Hae Mo-su, the founder of Northern Buyeo, and Lady Yuhwa, the daughter of the river god Habaek. It is said that Buru left Buyeo to create his own kingdom, where he later incorporated his home kingdom's name into his new one.

According to legend, Buru discovered a golden frog-like child under a large rock and named the child Geumwa, meaning "golden frog". Geumwa was later made the crown prince of Eastern Buyeo. According to the Samguk sagi, King Geumwa finds Lady Yuhwa (not considered as Buru's mother in this story) and takes her into his kingdom where she is touched by sunlight and gives birth to an egg. The egg hatches into a boy who later becomes Dongmyeong, the founder of Goguryeo. Geumwa becomes his adoptive father and allows Dongmyeong to grow up beside his own son and heir, Daeso (and possibly Galsa).

=== Early period ===
Geumwa became king after Hae Buru's death. Not long after, King Geumwa reversed his father's submission to Bukbuyeo and declared himself "Supreme king" and gave the title posthumously to his father, Hae Buru. At the Ubal river, near southern of Taebaek Mountain, Geumwa met Lady Yuhwa, who was the disowned daughter Habaek, the god of the Amnok River or, according to an alternative interpretation, the sun god Haebak. and brought her back to his palace. She was impregnated by sunlight and laid an egg, from which hatched Jumong.

Geumwa's two sons resented Jumong, and although Geumwa tried to protect him, Jumong ran away to Jolbon Buyeo, where he later established Goguryeo.

Geumwa's eldest son Daeso became the next King. King Daeso attacked Goguryeo during the reign of its second ruler, King Yuri. Goguryeo's third ruler King Daemusin attacked Dongbuyeo and killed King Daeso. After internal strife, Dongbuyeo fell, and its territory was absorbed into Goguryeo.

=== Later period ===
According to other records, Jumong was from Bukbuyeo, not Dongbuyeo. According to the Gwanggaeto stele, Dongbuyeo was a tributary of Goguryeo. Dongbuyeo was briefly revived by a small state established around 285 by refugees of Buyeo. This state was conquered by King Gwanggaeto the Great of Goguryeo in 410.

Although the chronology is inconsistent with the Samguk Sagi, one legend says Wutae, the father of the Baekje's founder and 1st ruler, Onjo, was a son of Hae Buru.

== See also ==
- Buyeo
- Galsa Buyeo
- Goguryeo
