= Mishihase =

Ancient ethnic group of Japan

The Mishihase (粛填), also read as Ashihase and Shukushin, were a people of ancient Japan, believed to have lived along the northern portion of the coast of the Sea of Japan. The term Sushen, rendered 肅愼, is found in Chinese records, but is annotated as Mishihase or Ashihase in Japanese language documents, which should have developed into *Mishiwase or *Ashiwase in modern Japanese if the word had survived in colloquial speech.

According to the Nihon Shoki, the Mishihase first arrived at Sado Island during the reign of Emperor Kinmei. In 660, Japanese General Abe no Hirafu defeated the Mishihase in "Watarishima" at the request of the native inhabitants. During the Edo period, Arai Hakuseki proposed that Watarishima was Ezo, which was later renamed Hokkaido. The battle place was recorded as the mouth of a large river, which is proposed to be Ishikari River.

Some historians consider that the Mishihase were identical to the Tungusic Sushen in Chinese records, but others think that the Japanese people named the indigenous people in the northeast based on their knowledge of Chinese records, just as the Chinese did during the Three Kingdoms period. Most, including Kisao Ishizuki (1979) of the Sapporo University, suggest that the Mishihase were the Nivkhs belonging to the Okhotsk culture.
