= Eastern Ye =

Former Korean chiefdom

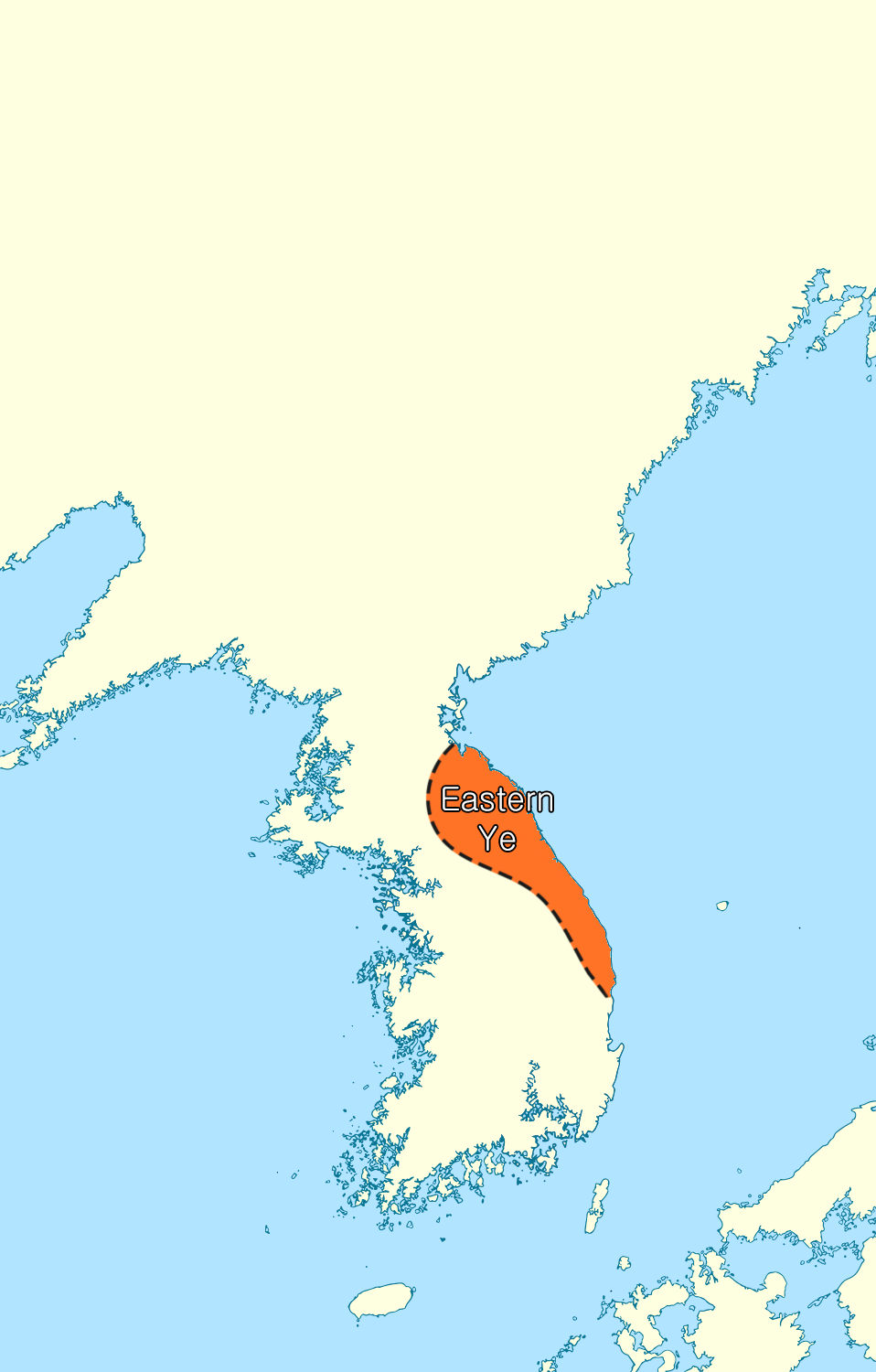
- Estimated area of Eastern Ye

Korean name
- Hangul: 예
- Hanja: 濊
- RR: Ye
- MR: Ye
- IPA: [je]

Alternate name
- Hangul: 동예
- Hanja: 東濊
- RR: Dongye
- MR: Tongye
- IPA: [toŋ.je]

Ye (Korean: 예; Hanja: 濊) or Dongye (동예; 東濊), which means the Eastern Ye, was a Korean chiefdom which occupied portions of the northeastern Korean peninsula from roughly the 3rd-century BC to around early 5th-century AD. It bordered Goguryeo and Okjeo to the north, Jinhan to the south, and China's Lelang Commandery to the west. Today, this territory consists of the provinces of South Hamgyŏng and Kangwon in North Korea, and Gangwon in South Korea.

== History ==
Ye appears in history as a vassal state of Goguryeo. In early 5th-century, however, King Gwanggaeto the Great of Goguryeo annexed Ye, leading to Goguryeo's domination of the entire northern portion of the Korean peninsula and most of Manchuria. A small part of Ye in the south was absorbed into Silla.

Haslla (何瑟羅; present-day Gangneung), Bulnaeye (不耐穢; present-day Anbyon County), Hwaryeo (華麗; present-day Kumya County) are known as the countries established by Ye. According to a recent study, Siljikgok (present-day Samcheok) is also seen as an area of the Ye culture.

According to the Book of the Later Han and Records of the Three Kingdoms, fellow soldiers are as good at infantry as Okjeo. They had a sense of homogeneity with Goguryeo. It is said that it used 3 zhang (丈) long spear as a weapon and supported the army as a vassal of Goguryeo.

== People and culture ==
The Ye people considered themselves to be the same people as the people of Goguryeo, and shared their language and ethnic origins with the people of Okjeo and Goguryeo. This may indicate that Dongye also shared a common origin with Buyeo and Gojoseon. The population was recorded to be 20,000 households.

Very little information about Ye has survived; most of the extant information comes from the discussion of the Eastern barbarians in the Chinese Records of Three Kingdoms. The custom of "Mucheon" (무천, 舞天), a festival of worshipping heaven through song and dance in the 10th month, is mentioned in some records. This appears to have been closely related to the Goguryeo festival of Dongmaeng, held at the same time of year, which also incorporated martial displays. The people worshipped the tiger as a deity.

The economy of Ye was based primarily on agriculture, including sericulture and hemp cultivation. The Mucheon festival was largely aimed at securing a good harvest in the coming year. Their agriculture appears to have been well-organised at the village level. Ye law meted out stiff penalties for those who encroached on communal land.

They have no sovereign chief... Their elders have long considered that they are of the same stock as the Goguryeo. Sincere by nature they keep their desires to a minimum, have a sense of shame, and do not beg for alms. In language, usages, and customs they are in general the same as the Goguryeo, but in their clothing there are differences. Men and women both wear pleated collars, and the men plait silver flowers several inches wide for adornment... Their custom is to give great importance to mountains and rivers, each of which has certain parts into which people are not permitted to wade indiscriminately. Members of the same clan do not intermarry. They have many superstitions and taboos: in the event of illness or death, they always abandon their old dwelling, rebuild, and resettle... They also sacrifice to the tiger as to a divine being... They make spears three zhang in length, sometimes carried by three men at once. They are capable foot soldiers; the "sandalwood bow" of Lelang comes from their land.

— Records of the Three Kingdoms

== See also ==
- Three Kingdoms of Korea
- History of Korea
- Yemaek
- Okjeo

== Bibliography ==
- Lee, Peter H. (1992), Sourcebook of Korean Civilization 1, Columbia University Press
