= Geumwa of Buyeo =

2nd King of Dongbuyeo (r. 48–8 BCE)

Geumwa of Buyeo 부여 해금와
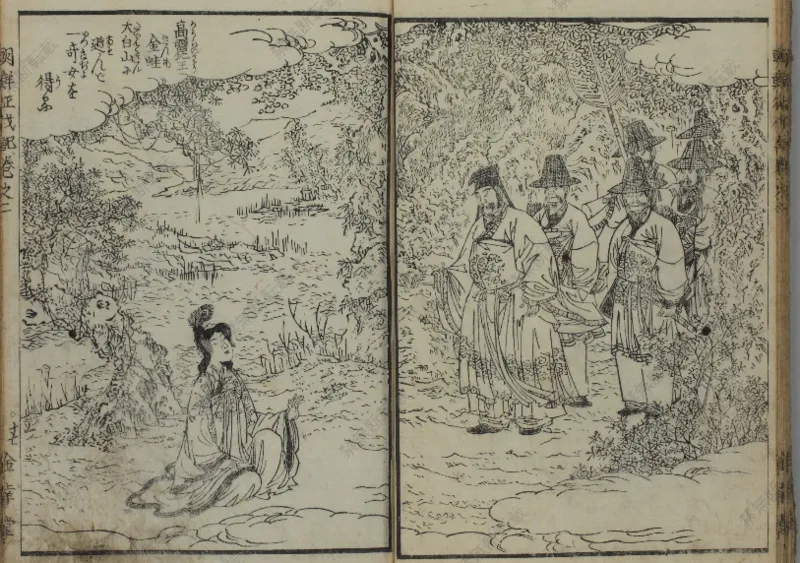
- Lady Yuhwa being found by King Geumwa by Sadahide in his book Chōsenseihatsuki (1854)

King of Eastern Buyeo
- Reign: 48 BCE – 8 BCE
- Predecessor: King Buru
- Successor: King Daeso
- Died: c. 7–8 BCE
- Spouse: Unknown; Lady Yuhwa
- Issue: Daeso
- House: House of Hae
- Father: King Buru

- Geumwa of Buyeo
- Hangul: 해금와
- Hanja: 解金蛙
- RR: Hae Geumwa
- MR: Hae Kŭmwa

Hae Geumwa (Korean: 해금와; Hanja: 解金蛙) was the second ruler (48–7 BCE) of Dongbuyeo (East Buyeo), an ancient kingdom of Korea. His story is recorded in the Samguk sagi, Samguk Yusa and Book of King Dongmyeong.

== Birth and background ==
Geumwa (金蛙 or 金蝸) was the son of Hae Buru, who was the king of Dongbuyeo. According to the Samgukyusa, Hae Buru was old and without an heir, when he found a gold-colored frog-like (or a gold-colored snail-like) child under a large rock near Lake Gonyeon. Hae Buru named the child Geumwa, meaning golden frog (or golden snail), and later made him crown prince.

Hae Buru established Dongbuyeo when he moved the capital east to Gaseopwon (Korean: 가섭원; Hanja: 迦葉原) by the East Sea.

== Reign ==
=== Jumong's departure ===
Geumwa became king after Hae Buru's death. At Ubal river (Korean: 우발수; Hanja: 優渤水), south of Mount Taebaek, Geumwa met Lady Yuhwa (Korean: 유화부인; Hanja: 柳花夫人), the disowned daughter of Habaek (Korean: 하백; Hanja: 河伯), the god of the Amnok River or, according to an alternative interpretation, the sun god Haebak (Korean: 해밝), and brought her back to his palace. She was impregnated by sunlight and conceived Ko Chumong (Dongmyeong of Goguryeo).

Geumwa's two sons resented Chumong, and so did he. He attempted numerous times to destroy Chumong when he was a teen, but later gave up, as the boy was indestructible. Chumong later ran away to Jolbon, or former Bukbuyeo, where he later established Goguryeo.

=== Mother of Goguryeo ===
Lady Yuhwa, Jumong's mother, died. Geumwa gave her the burial of a Queen Mother (Queen Mother of Goguryeo), despite the fact that she had never been a queen. Chumong sent numerous gifts to Geumwa in gratitude of caring for his mother, and peace was seemingly restored between the two kingdoms.

== Death ==
Geumwa died, and the throne was passed to his eldest son Daeso. King Daeso attacked Goguryeo during the reign of its second ruler, King Yuri. Goguryeo's third ruler King Daemusin attacked Dongbuyeo and killed Daeso. After internal strife, Dongbuyeo fell, and its territory was absorbed into Goguryeo.

== Popular culture ==
- Portrayed by Jun Kwang-ryul in the 2006–2007 MBC TV series Jumong.

== See also ==
- Dongmyeong of Goguryeo
- Lady Yuhwa
- Hae Buru
- Dongbuyeo
- List of Korean monarchs
- History of Korea

Preceded by Hae Buru of Dongbuyeo	Rulers of Dongbuyeo (Dongbuyeo); 48 BCE – 7 BCE	Succeeded by Daeso of Dongbuyeo
