= Yemaek =

Ancestors of the Koreans from Northeast Asia

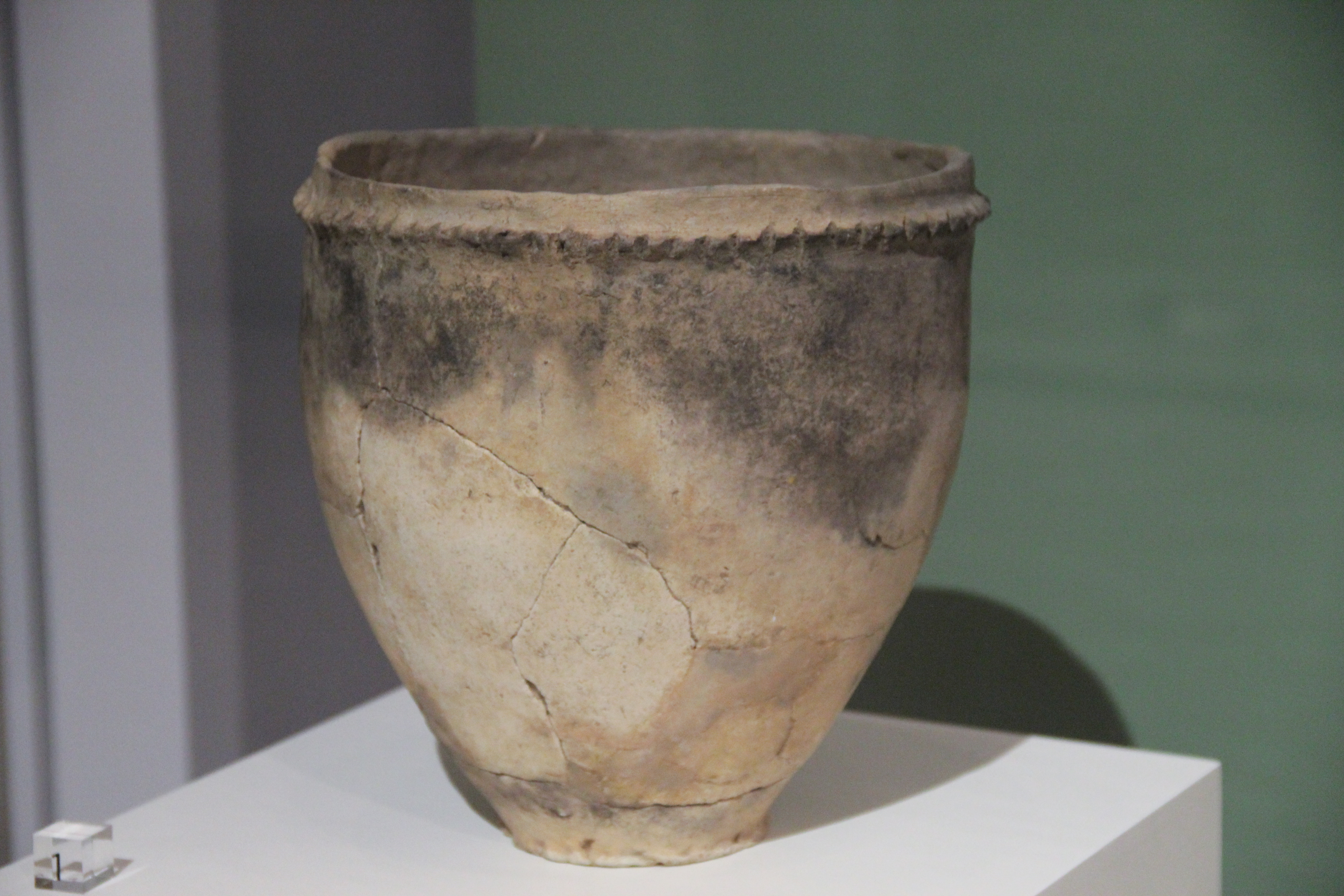
- Pottery of the Yemaek people (early Bronze Age Old Chosŏn; c. 1500–850 BCE)

Korean name
- Hangul: 예맥
- Hanja: 濊貊/穢貊
- RR: Yemaek
- MR: Yemaek

Yemaek (Korean: 예맥; Hanja: 濊貊) is the name for an ancient group of ethnic Koreans who resided in Manchuria, and the northern part of Korea. Alongside the Samhan people, they are believed to be the major contributors of modern day Koreans' genetics as well as culture, food, traditions, and language.

== Overview ==
It is believed that the Yemaek people were either a homogenous group or a heterogenous one that assimilated to become a single group. The latter hypothesis posits that the name Yemaek is in fact an amalgamation of two separate, but related groups, known as the "Ye" and the "Maek" tribes which later formed into one polity, becoming the newly "Ye-Maek" people. However, other detractors criticize this logic by alluding to sources that posit that they were a single group from the very beginning. Others postulate that the Yemaek people were a branch group of the bigger Maek tribe.

Despite the controversy surrounding whether they were homogenous, heterogenous or a branch of Maek, the current consensus is that Yemaek people were indeed a blend of the Ye and Maek tribes, but were ethnolinguistically identical, and only remained as socially and politically disparate identities.

Yemaek kingdoms

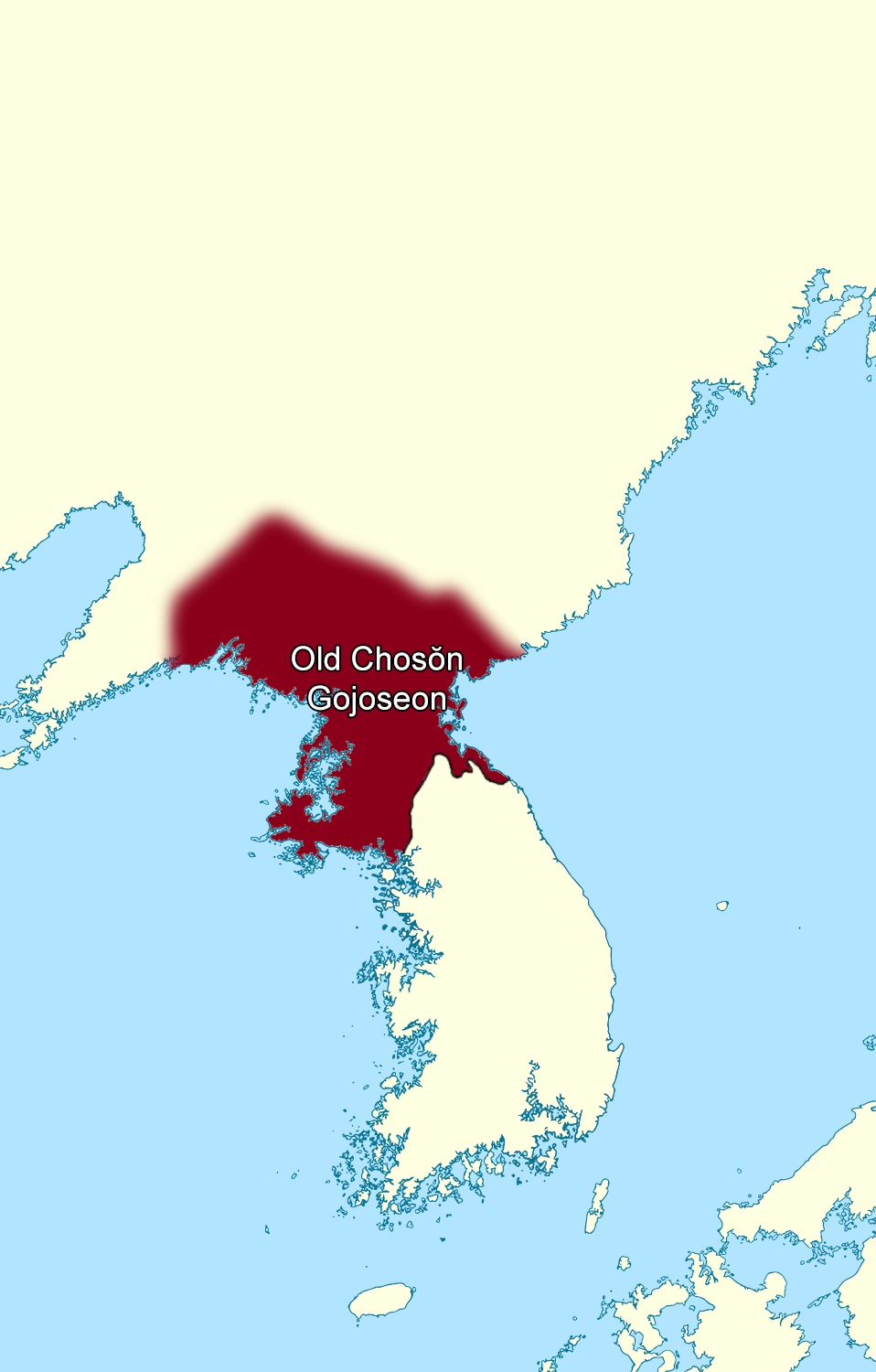
Old Chosŏn in 108 BCE

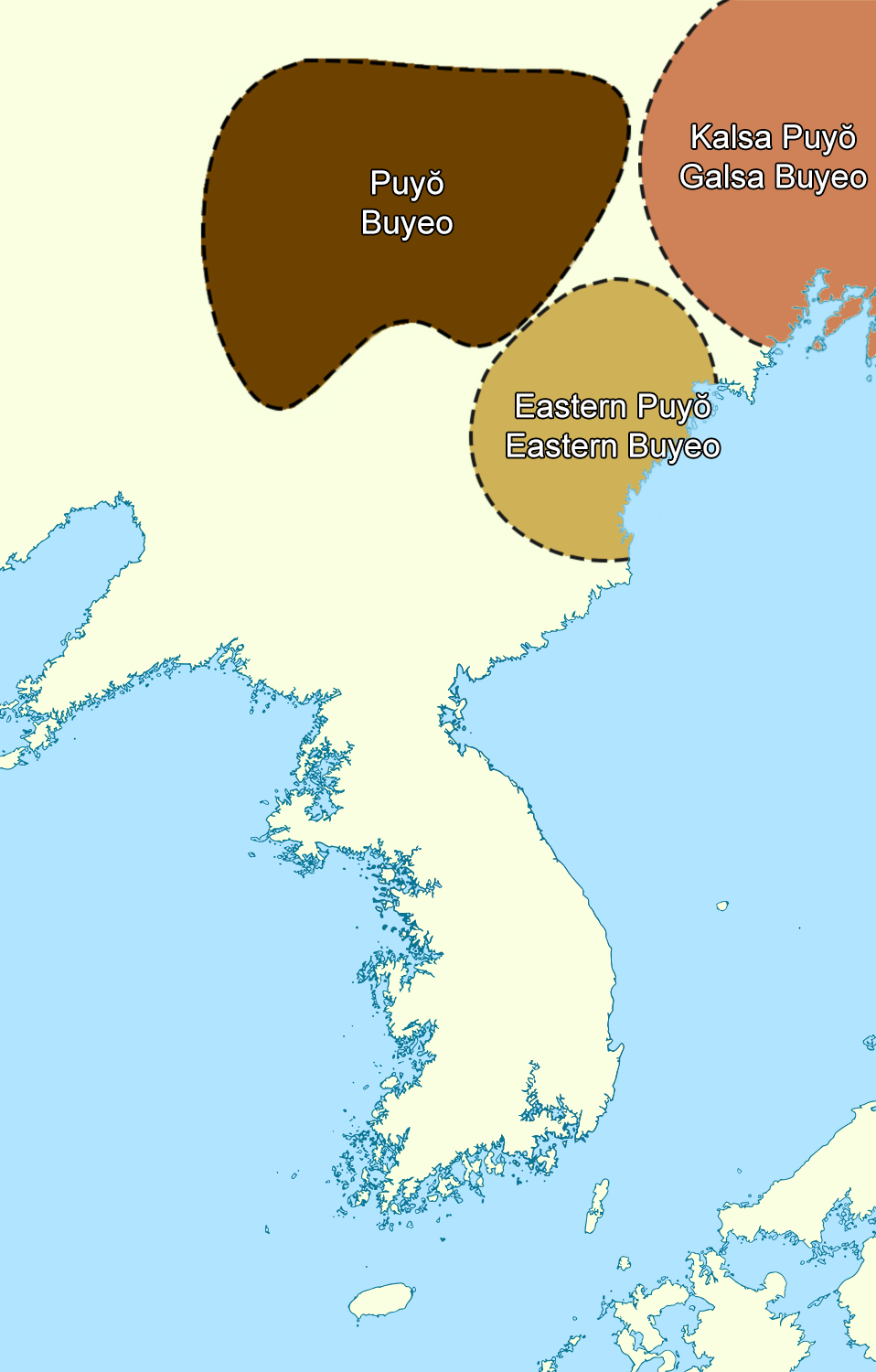
Buyeo (and its successors) in c. 3–5th century CE

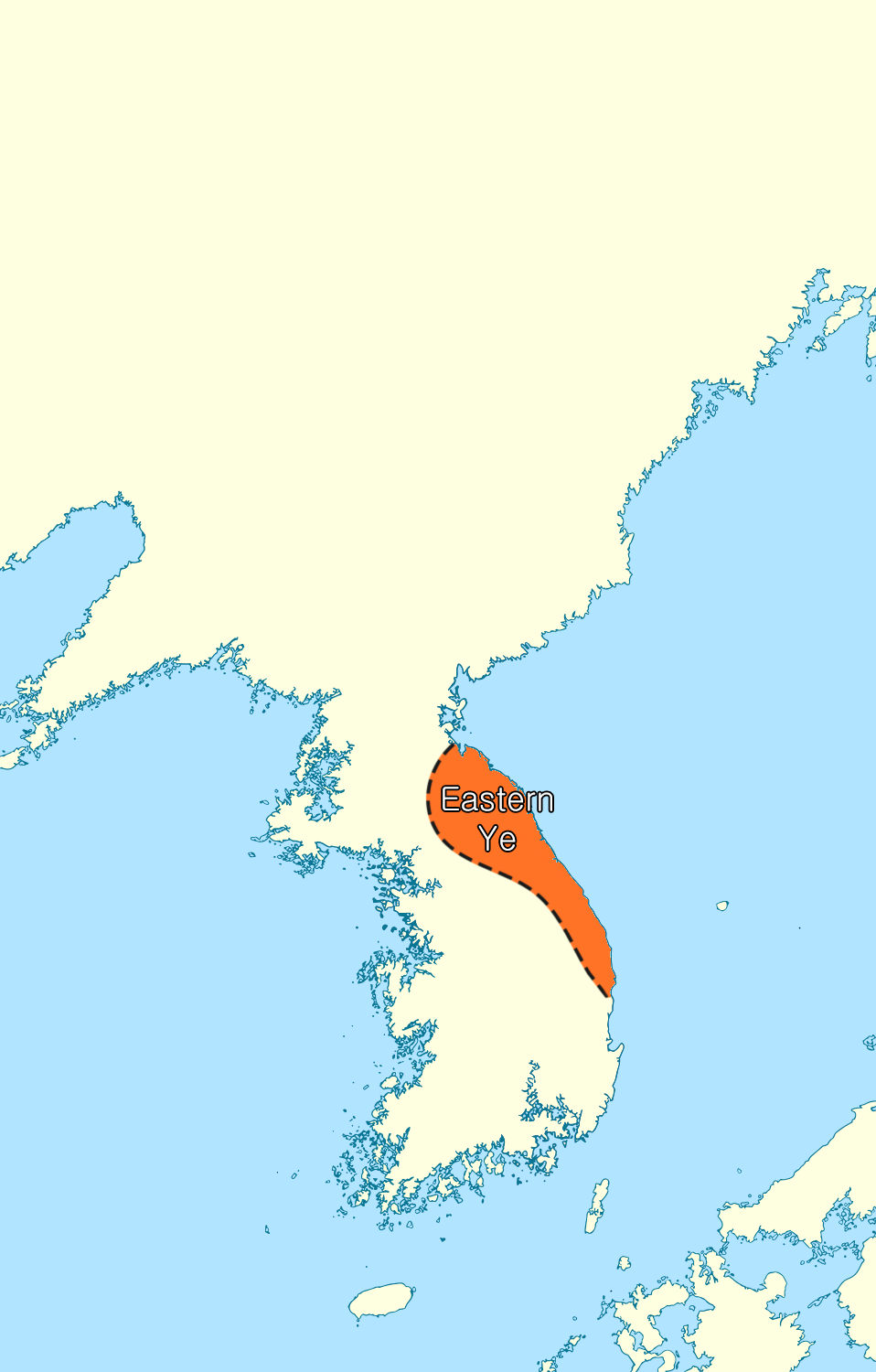
Eastern Ye in c. 4th century CE

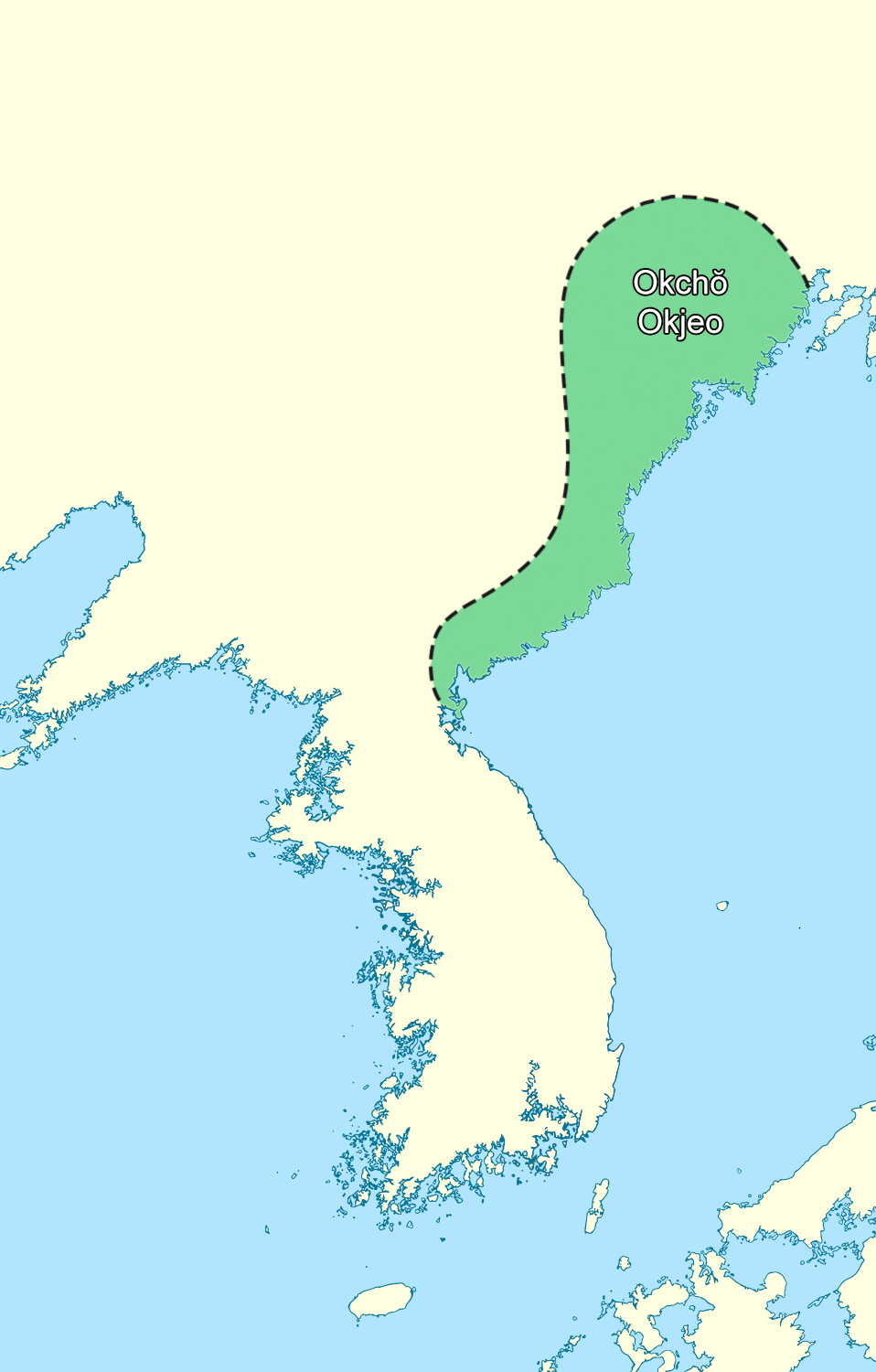
Okjeo in c. 1–2nd century CE

The first Yemaek state proper to appear in history was Old Chosŏn (2333[?]–108 BCE), originally called simply as "Chosŏn", but was renamed in order to prevent confusion with its ostensible successor dynasty, "Chosŏn (Joseon)" (1392–1897 CE) of the same characters. The lesser known Yemaek state was the kingdom of Buyeo (2nd century BCE–494 CE), a state that co-existed with Old Chosŏn throughout its time. Other kingdoms such as Eastern Ye and Okjeo are also believed to have been part of the Yemaek-sphere.

Though not sharing any borders, it also co-existed much of its history with the Samhan polities as well as their predecessor, the Jin state. It is unclear to what extent the Yemaek had influence over the southern parts of the peninsula, but by the beginning of the Three Kingdoms period of Korea, Yemaek peoples, especially from the kingdoms of Old Chosŏn and Buyeo, were dominant in places such as Goguryeo, Paekche, Silla, and Kaya.

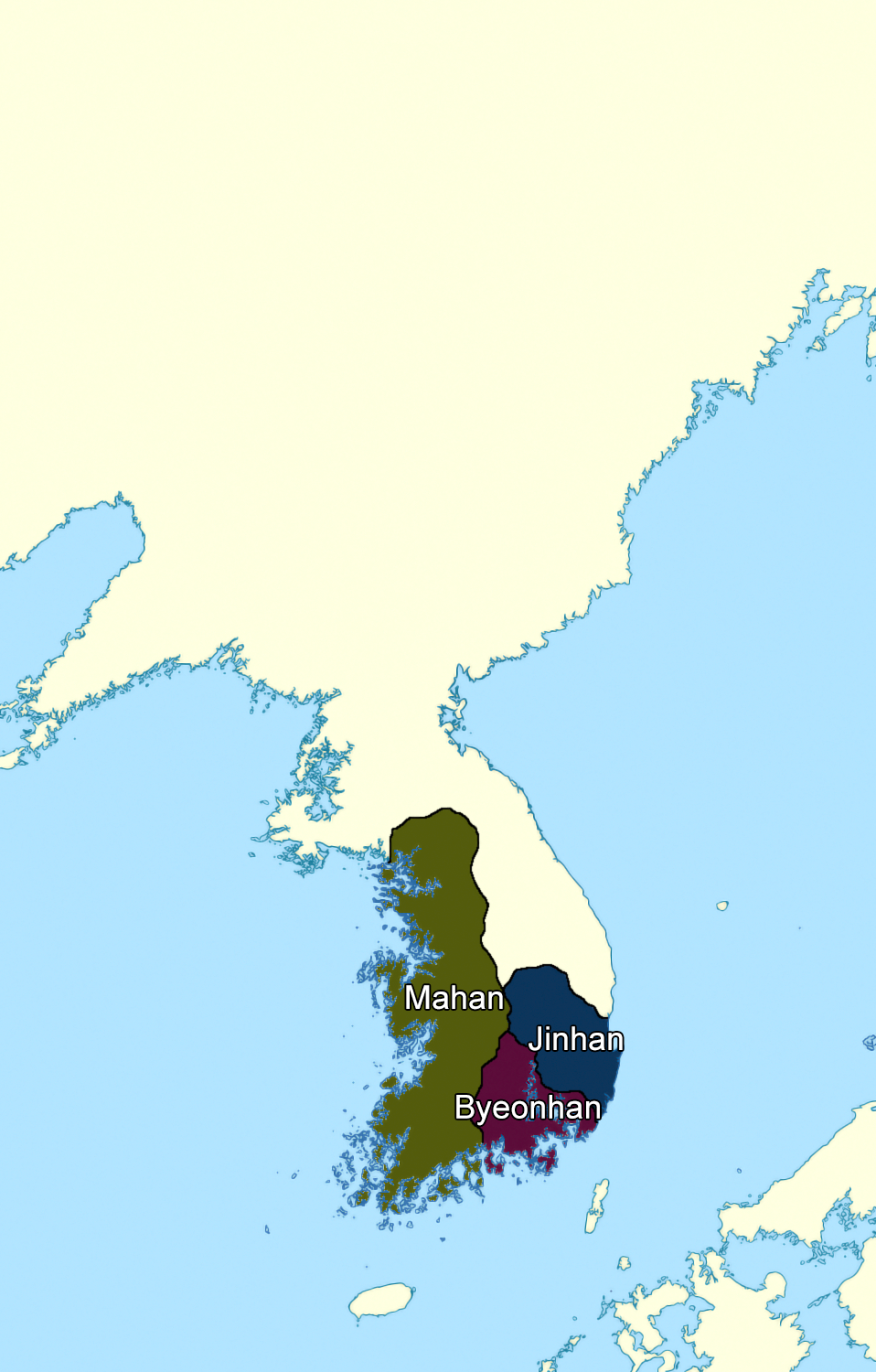
The Samhan confederacies in c. 2 BCE

『先是、朝鮮遺民分居山谷之間、爲六村、一曰閼川楊山村、二曰突山髙墟村、三曰觜山珍支村 或云干珍村、四曰茂山大樹村、五曰金山加利村、六曰明活山髙耶村、是爲辰韓六部。』

"In the beginning, there were six villages inhabited by the refugee [Old] Chosŏn people (Yemaek) within the valley; Alch'ŏn of Yangsan, Tolsan of Kohŏ, Ch'wisan of Chinji (or Kanjin), Musan of Taesu, Kŭmsan of Kari, and Myŏnghwalsan of Koya. These were known as the 'Six villages of Jinhan'."

— Kim Pusik, Samguk sagi, Book of Silla

It is also recorded that the Samhan confederacies (Mahan/Byeonhan/Jinhan) also included Yemaek inhabitants, further adding credence to the possibility of the Yemaek and Samhan people constantly assimilating with one another throughout history.

== History ==
The earliest attestations of the word "Yemaek" appear in the Records of the Three Kingdoms (3rd century CE) which states that the kingdom of Goguryeo bordered with Yemaek and Chosŏn (Old Chosŏn) (Note: Not to be confused with Old Chosŏn which fell circa four centuries earlier, and Joseon which would not be founded for another millennium; it has been hypothesised this were the area around Pyŏngyang) to the south.

However, it is also recorded in the Book of Later Han (5th century CE) that the polities of: Ye, Maek, Wa, and Han disparately provided tribute to Eastern Han dynasty in order to secure their borders to prevent raids from the people of Maek. Although the Records of the Three Kingdoms was published before the Book of Later Han, the latter testifies records of earlier history, which in turn, created a debate on whether the tribes were initially separate or not in recent times.

In contrast, the earliest definitive attestations for Yemaek as a homogenous identity appear later in the Book of Later Han wherein it is recorded that China's eastern borders became quiet after the "Yemaek people were subdued". The current historian circles assert this as evidence for the denomination pointing at Goguryeo, as its name became analogous with its predecessor's name at the end of the chapter. Assuming this premise, the theory posits that Goguryeo was synonymous to the unification of Yemaek by the fifth century CE.

The first Korean historiographical attempt to analyze Yemaek was conducted by Chŏng Yagyong in his 1811 book, Study of the Territories of My Nation (我邦疆域考; 아방강역고) which states that Maek was the name of the people and Ye was the name of the location. Thus, he posited that the complete word, Yemaek was one of the "Nine peoples of Maek (九貊)" which seems to reflect the Sinocentric model of the Nine Barbarians of the East. The "East Barbarians" also known as "Dongyi (東夷)" in Chinese, were a motif that is recurrent in both the Records of the Three Kingdoms and the Book of Later Han. Both books designate the Japanese, the Koreans and the Yilou as "Eastern Barbarians". Due to the Yilou being mutually unintelligible with its southern neighbor, Buyeo, it is generally agreed that the inclusion of Yilou was alluding to the Jurchen people.

The concept of Eastern Barbarians was also idiomatically dubbed the "Nine Barbarians". However, due to the unlikelihood of such populations co-existing to that extent, the number is believed to have been exaggerated. Regardless, the significance of the number nine is believed to have influenced the nine-story pagoda known as the Hwangnyongsa (erected in the capital of Silla) which commemorated the unification of the Korean peninsula whereby each floor designated a people Silla subdued, also known as the "Nine Hans (九韓; 구한; Guhan)". Chŏng Yagyong's analysis demonstrates the Korean people's fascination for the Yemaek being their ancestors was considered as early as the Joseon period.

== Identity ==
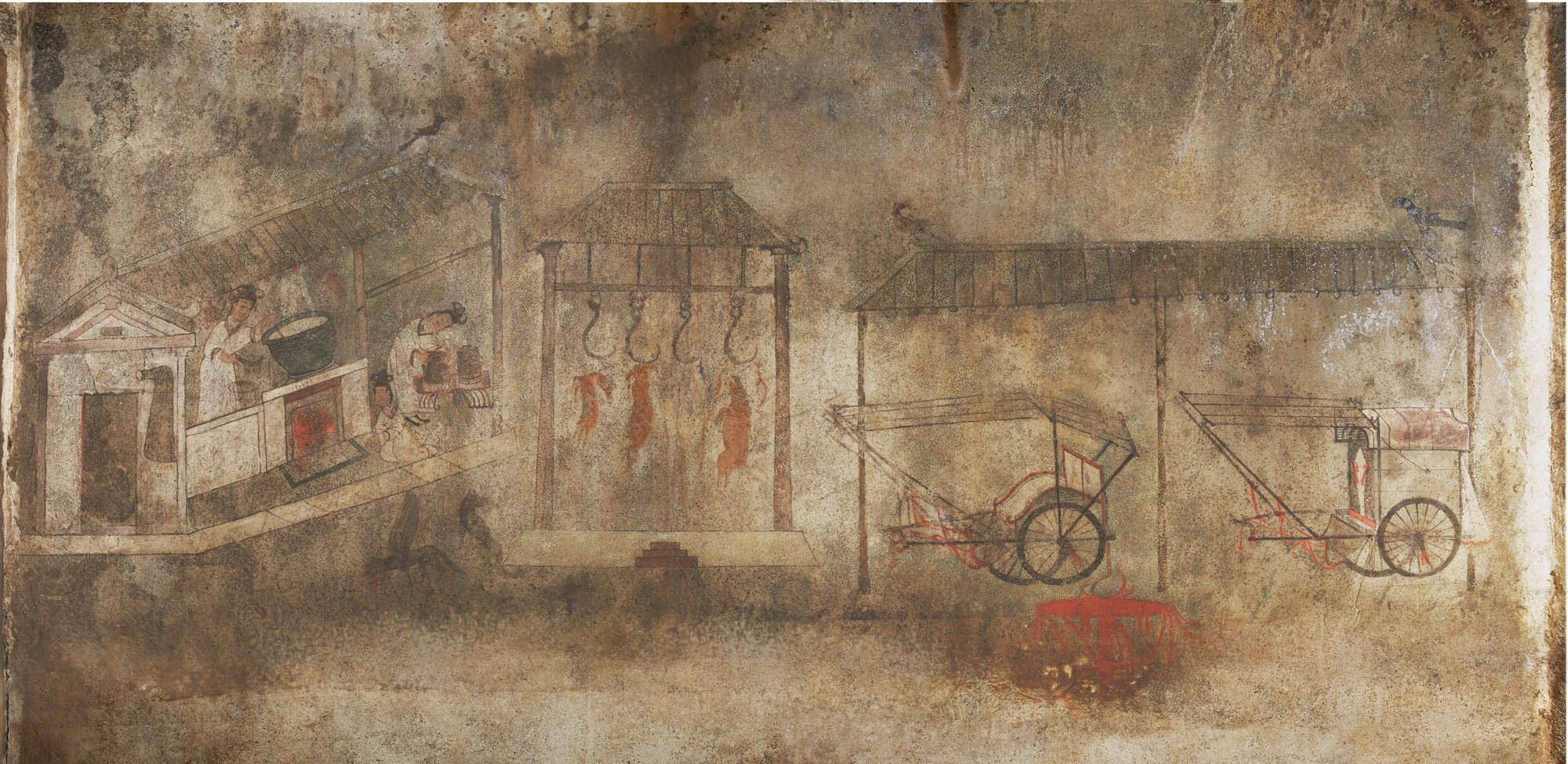
A mural painting found within Anak Tomb No. 3 depicting meat preparation that is believed to be "Maek-jeok (貊炙; 맥적)", a style that has been passed down by the Yemaek and considered as the ancient precursor to Korean barbecue.

Due to the major cultural impact of Old Chosŏn and Buyeo in Korean history, Yemaek people, together with the inhabitants of the Samhan states, acted as the foundation for the formation of the modern Korean national identity, also known as the "Han (Korean: 한; Hanja: 韓)" identity. However, in ancient times, prior to the unification of the peninsula, polities stemming from the respective tribes did not view one another as equals, but rather rivals, especially during the Three Kingdoms period of Korea. Out of the three kingdoms which succeeded in forming a centralized bureaucracy, Goguryeo retained the strongest connection with Yemaek people, claiming to be the direct descendants of the Old Chosŏn people while also having direct connections to Buyeo. This was likely due to the kingdom forming from the lands of Old Chosŏn, and its founder hailing from the kingdom of Buyeo, allowing Goguryeo to possess the most agency to claim the "Yemaek identity" out of all the Korean kingdoms at the time. Other kingdoms such as Silla and Paekche (and sometimes Kaya) all possessed major influences from the Yemaek people as well, but were also related to the Samhan-sphere, becoming somewhat of a bridge between the cultures. Therefore, in recent times, the study of Yemaek and its sole identity is mostly centralized around Goguryeo.

Several controversies surrounding Goguryeo revolve around the inherent issues found in the historicity and the etymology behind the Yemaek people due to the sparsity of sources. However, it is believed that the inhabitants of Goguryeo were an accumulation of many peoples such as "Daesu-Maek (大水貊)", "Sosu-Maek (小水貊)", and purportedly "Yang-Maek (梁貊)". Furthermore, people who resided in the river basin of the Amnok River (Yalu River) began to be referred to as "Maek" somewhere near Anno Domini, and is hypothesized that they amalgamated with the Ye people whom migrated from Buyeo. They subsequently accelerated their expansion by further conquering nearby tribes, thus forming a unified Yemaek identity under one sovereign.

=== Ye ===
The Ye were attested in the Records of the Three Kingdoms to border Goguryeo to the north on the coast of the Great Sea. However, they were retroactively denominated as "Eastern Ye" by modern historians in order to discern them from the hypothetical Ye who made up Yemaek, though the two are virtually indiscernible in contemporary records. It is attested in the Records of the Three Kingdoms that the Ye had no king and its elders had claimed for generations they were the same people as Goguryeo. Of the city-states of Ye, Bulne-Ye-guk (不耐穢國; 불내예국) was the most powerful and longest lasting. Moreover, a grave was excavated in the Nangnang area in 1958 wherein a silver seal carved as "Bujŏ-Ye-gun (夫組穢君; 부저예군)" was discovered. The evidence alludes to the Ye also being able to be transcribed in Hanja as "穢".

=== Maek ===
The origin for Goguryeo is provided in the Records of the Three Kingdoms wherein it was founded in the river basin of "Daesu (大水; 대수)" or "big water" mostly likely the Amnok (Yalu) River. Another state is said to have been founded by a split branch of Goguryeo in the river basin of "Sosu (小水; 소수)" or "small water" most likely the Doɳga (Hun) River, hence, they were called "Sosu-Maek (小水貊; 소수맥)". The two records were the earliest attested identification of Goguryeo as Maek. Moreover, another state called "Yang-Maek (梁貊; 양맥)" is attested in the Samguk sagi that it was subdued by Yuri of Goguryeo in the 33rd year of his reign whilst on their way to attack the Xuantu Commandery. Since the contemporary capital of the colony lied in the coast of the Doɳga (Hun) River, it has been hypothesized that Yang-Maek referred to the Maek who lived in the river basin of "Yangsu (梁水; 양수)" most likely the Taizi River situated between the Amnok (Yalu) and Doɳga (Hun) rivers. However, it has also been hypothesized that Yangsu simply refers to Sosu and thus were the same people. Considering that Cao Wei was defeated near Yang-Maek by King Dongchŏn and again by King Jungchŏn, the two states most likely served as existential roles for the Maek's sovereignty.

== Language ==
It is attested in the Records of the Three Kingdoms that the knowledge had been passed down for generations within the Eastern Barbarians that Goguryeo was a split branch of Buyeo and their traditions and languages were alike. It is further attested in the Records of the Three Kingdoms that the language of Okjeo was generally identical to Goguryeo, though there existed differences at times and the language, manners and traditions of Ye were also generally identical to Goguryeo.

It has been hypothesized that the language spoken by the Yemaek was heavily linked to the Koreanic languages. Most likely being a proto-Koreanic family that entered as the Yemaek migrated south, closer to the inland of the peninsula.

It is unclear to what extent the language had its influence on, with scholars such as Alexander Vovin positing that the language spoken by the Yemaek people was more Koreanic while the language spoken by the Samhan was closer to Japonic. He theorized that the incoming Yemaek waves from the north (from Old Chosŏn and Buyeo) first co-existed with the Japonic speakers of the south (Samhan) which was later absorbed with parts of its influence remaining, resulting in the modern Korean language. The idea later evolved into the Peninsular Japonic theory.

Later, after the formation of the Three Kingdoms period of Korea, the language formally became what is known as Old Korean, a possible amalgamation of both proto-Koreanic and proto-Japonic (Peninsular Japonic) languages, however, with Koreanic elements being the backbone. This language was later introduced to Japan during the Kofun period with the introduction of Toraijins who are believed to be the descendants of the assimilated Yemaek/Samhan peoples and the major genetical contributors to both modern day Koreans and Japanese.

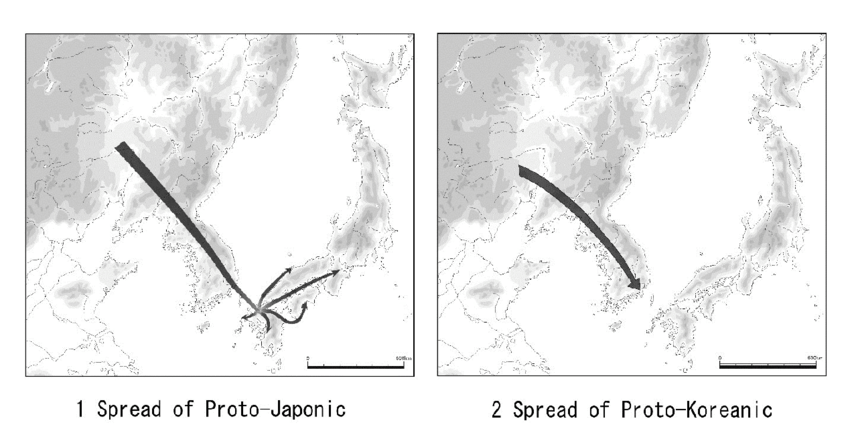
The migration routes of proto-Japonic and proto-Koreanic speakers. (2022)

According to Kazuo Miyamoto (宮本 一夫), a renowned linguist and emeritus professor at Kyushu University, "Central Japanese was heavily influenced by Old Korean (possibly through Baekje) during the Kofun and Asuka periods, from the 4th to 7th centuries AD". He linked the Yayoi period with the Mumun period of Korea and stated that the proto-Japonic language was spread during this time. He also remarked that the proto-Japonic of the Yayoi/Mumun period and proto-Koreanic that was introduced during Kofun/Asuka period stemmed from the same ancestral language, stating that "the homeland of both languages is the same based on archeological evidence, and they are kindred language families" and that "Proto-Japonic and Proto-Koreanic split off from the Transeurasian languages in southern Manchuria" positing that the Yayoi (proto-Japonic) and Kofun (proto-Koreanic) migrations were heavily related.

Historically, it is also stated that the Samhan people resemble more of the people of Wa (Japan).

『弁辰與辰韓雜居，城郭衣服皆同，言語風俗有異。其人形皆長大，美髮，衣服絜清。而刑法嚴峻。其國近倭，故頗有文身者。』

"Byeonhan and Jinhan people live together with their clothes within the cities being the same. However, their customs and languages differ. They are tall, have beautiful hair, and wear neat clothes. They are also strict on laws. They are close to Wa (Japan) and they all have tattoos."

— Book of the Later Han, Book of Dongyi

Based on both modern and ancient accounts, it is speculated that the Mumun people introduced the proto-Japonic language first to Korea (who later became the Samhan people in Korea and the Yayoi people in Japan) and the Yemaek people followed with their proto-Koreanic language (who later assimilated and became the Three Kingdoms period Koreans). However, due to both groups originating from similar areas, they are believed to be closely linked.

== Cultural impact ==
The capital of Paekche was called Komnaru, literally meaning "Bear Port", and is believed to be able to trace its etymology to a Yemaek word "kue:ma:". The Yemaek word "kue:ma:" is also believed to be related to the Japanese words kami (神; かみ) for "god" and koma (高麗; こま) for Goguryeo or kuma (熊; くま) for bear (also read as "gom/kom; 곰" in modern Korean). Therefore, it is believed that the Yemaek and Goguryeo cultures included the use of bear totems. It is also attested in the Records of the Three Kingdoms that the people of Eastern Ye used tiger totems. Ergo, Korean scholars have associated these phenomena with the Tan'gun's founding legend of Old Chosŏn, positing the amalgamation of the Ye with tiger totems and Maek with bear totems resulting in Ye-Maek which later became Old Chosŏn.

Archaeologically, the period of the Yemaek is often defined by the Liaoning bronze dagger culture (lute-shaped bronze daggers). the advent of Iron Age swords and iron farming tools in the 7th-6th century CE is also believed to have been introduced by the Yemaek people which concurrently initiated aquaculture. Modern studies have additionally traced the origins of lute-shaped bronze daggers to bronze daggers of the Fëdorovo culture. It is currently hypothesized that the indigenous agriculture fused with imported pastoralism via bronze daggers to amalgamate into agropastoral practices that defined the nature of Yemaek civilization.

== Legacy ==
It is recorded that the exonyms for Korea were "Mukuri" and "Mug-lig" in Sanskrit and Tibetan, respectively. Paul Pelliot believed these names could be the origins of the obscure people "Muc" accounted by Guillaume de Rubrouck. "Muc" were introduced as people 'beyond' "Longa" and "Solanga" by Rubrouck: where "Longa" and "Solanga" themselves people 'beyond' "Tebet." It has been asserted by Christopher Atwood that the earliest attestations for "Solanga" appear in the Ystoria Mongalorum as "Solangi." It is argued that: "combining the sense of regnal status and geography, only Korea would seem to fit," whereupon vis-à-vis Rubrouck's "Solanga," "the description of the envoy's clothing and hat are unmistakable that of Goryeo dynasty Korea, and the behavior of the envoy while speaking his message is exactly that of an official at a Confucian court." Ergo, Pelliot's hypothesis that "Muc" people (accounted by Rubrouck) are also Korean thus seems to be a reasonable conclusion and furthermore appear to be a transliteration of Maek. Therefore, it could be hypothesised Maek remained an exonym for Korea into the 13th century AD.

It is claimed the earliest attestations for Korea in occidental sources appear in the Theophylact Simocatta Historiae. Michael and Mary Whitby's translation attests: "Others of the Avars, who declined to humbler fortune because of their defeat, came to those who are called Mucri; this nation is the closest neighbour to the men of Taugast; it has great might in battle both because of its daily practice of drill and because of endurance of spirit in danger." Their footnote identifies "Mucri" as a nation in the Korean peninsula and " Mουκρί" (the original text in Greek) are further hypothesised to refer to Goguryeo since 𐰋𐰇𐰚𐰠𐰃 (Bökli) is attested to be Old Turkic for Goguryeo. Due to how highly restrictive Old Turkic were in which consonant words could begin with, it has been reconstructed that the exonym for Goguryeo by Avar were pronounced "Mökli," thus "Mουκρί" in Greek.

== See also ==
- Samhan people
- History of Korea
  - Old Chosŏn
  - Buyeo
  - Eastern Ye
  - Okjeo
  - Goguryeo
  - Samhan
  - Silla
  - Paekche
  - Kaya confederacy
- List of monarchs of Korea
- Koreanic languages
  - Ye-Maek language
  - Puyŏ languages
- History of Manchuria
