= Daeso of Buyeo =

Last King of Dongbuyeo (60 BCE – 22 AD)

Hae Daeso of Buyeo 부여 해대소

3rd King of Dongbuyeo
- Reign: 7 BCE – 22 AD
- Coronation: c. 7 BCE
- Predecessor: Hae Geumwa of Dongbuyeo
- Successor: Dynasty abolished
- Born: BCE 60; Kingdom of Dongbuyeo
- Died: c. 21-22 AD; Kingdom of Dongbuyeo
- House: House of Hae
- Father: Hae Geumwa of Dongbuyeo

- Daeso of Buyeo
- Hangul: 해대소
- Hanja: 解帶素
- RR: Hae Daeso
- MR: Hae Taeso

Hae Daeso (Korean: 해대소; Hanja: 解帶素; 60 BCE – 22 AD, r. 7 BCE – 22 AD) was the third and last ruler of the ancient Korean kingdom Dongbuyeo.

== Early life ==
Daeso was the first son of King Geumwa, and the grandson of Dongbuyeo's founder and first ruler, Hae Buru. As the eldest son of Geumwa, he was made Crown Prince of Dongbuyeo.

Goguryeo's founder, Jumong's exceptional skill at archery gave cause for tremendous jealousy and envy from Daeso and his six brothers. Jumong knew that his continuing presence in Dongbuyeo placed him in real danger, so he decided to flee to Jolbon Buyeo. In 37 BC, Jumong established Goguryeo, the northernmost of the Three Kingdoms of Korea. In 7 BC, King Geumwa died, elevating Daeso to the throne of Dongbuyeo.

== War with Goguryeo ==
As king, Daeso gathered enough military power to attack Goguryeo. Before attacking, however, he sent an envoy to Goguryeo's King Yuri, ordering him to send a royal hostage to Dongbuyeo. Goguryeo rejected the order leading to the first Goguryeo-Dongbuyeo war to occur in 6 AD. Daeso directly led a 50,000-man army into Goguryeo, but was forced to retreat when heavy snow began to fall. After this defeat, Daeso had to wait seven years before he could seek to regain what he had lost from the first war with Goguryeo. In 13 AD, Daeso led his armies into Goguryeo once again. This time, Muhyul, crown prince of Goguryeo, led the armies of Goguryeo in a well-planned ambush and slaughtered virtually all of Daeso's army. Only Daeso and a few of his men escaped back to Dongbuyeo.

== Death and aftermath ==
After the death of Goguryeo's King Yuri, Crown Prince Muhyul rose to the throne to become King Daemusin. In 21 AD, King Daemusin led an army and invaded Dongbuyeo, eventually killing Daeso, but he didn't destroy Dongbuyeo. Instead, in 22 AD the nephew of King Daeso, Dojin, was given responsibility for Dongbuyeo but with its territory being absorbed into the kingdom of Goguryeo.

== Popular culture ==
- Portrayed by Kim Seung-soo in the 2006–2007 MBC TV series Jumong.
- Portrayed by Han Jin-hee in the 2008–2009 KBS2 TV series The Kingdom of the Winds.

== See also ==
- Dongmyeong of Goguryeo

Preceded by Geumwa of Dongbuyeo	Rulers of Dongbuyeo (Dongbuyeo); 7 BCE – 22	Succeeded by Dojin of Dongbuyeo
