= Yilou =

Ancient ethnic group

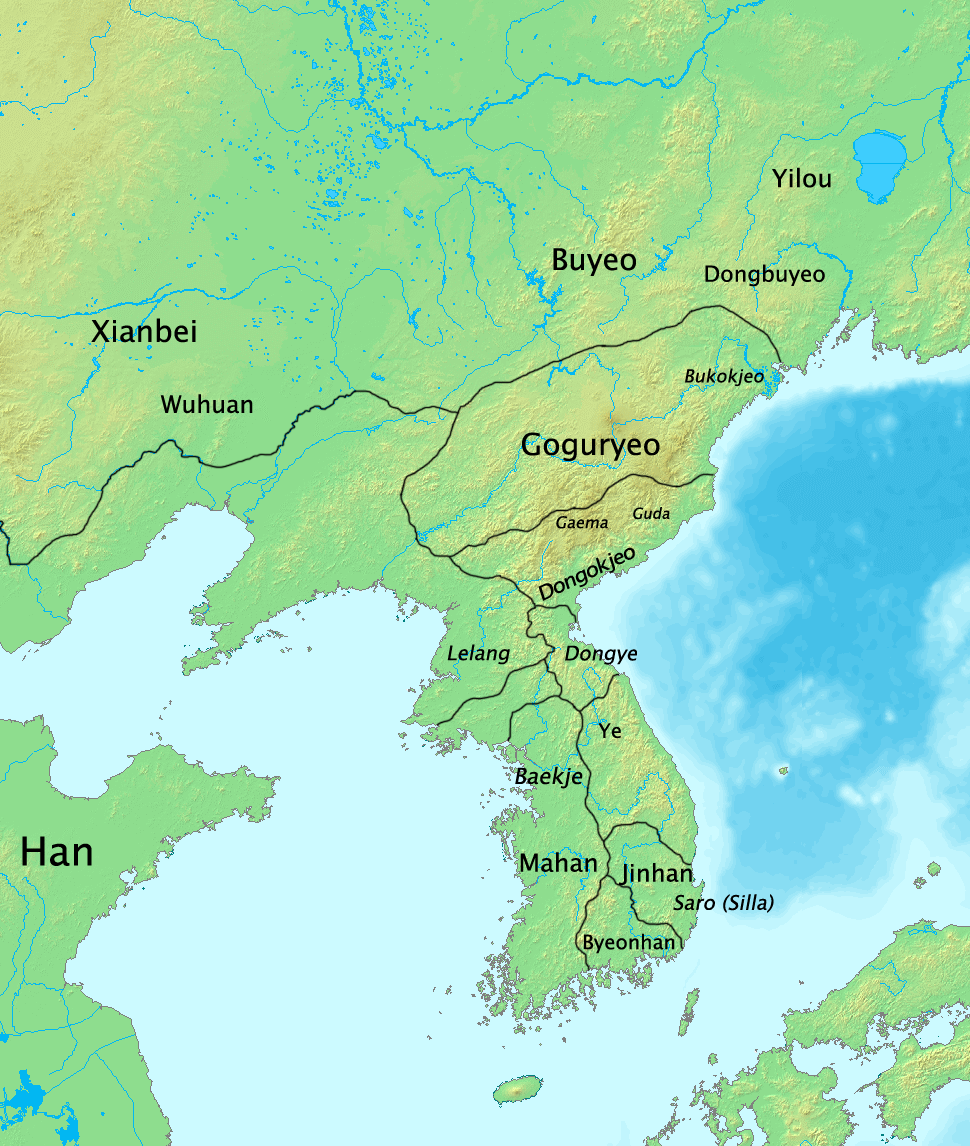
- A map of 1st century Korea and Manchuria, with the early Yilou placed to the northeast

Chinese name
- Traditional Chinese: 挹婁
- Hanyu Pinyin: Yìlóu
- Baxter–Sagart (2014): */qip-[r]o/

Korean name
- Hangul: 읍루
- Revised Romanization: Eumnu
- McCune–Reischauer: Ŭmnu

Alternative names

Sushen
- Traditional Chinese: 肅愼
- Simplified Chinese: 肃慎
Transcriptions
Standard Mandarin
- Hanyu Pinyin: Sùshèn
Old Chinese
- Baxter–Sagart (2014): */siwk-[d]i[n]-s/

Yilou is the modern Chinese name of a people in 3rd- to 6th-century Manchuria.

In some sources, their name was also written as Sushen, after an earlier people that were traditionally thought to be from the same region. Although it is common to link the Yilou to the earlier Sushen or the later Mohe (and hence to the Jurchens who founded the Jin Dynasty and the Manchus who founded the Qing), such connections remain unclear, and the groups may even be from different regions entirely. Some historians think that the Chinese, having heard that the Yilou paid arrows as tribute, simply linked them with the Sushen based on ancient records recording a similar practice.

The Yilou disappeared from documents in the 6th century. The Mohe rose into power there instead.

== Accounts by outsiders ==
The Records of the Three Kingdoms records that the Yilou were located more than a thousand li north of Buyeo in forests covering mountainous terrain that had formerly been the kingdom of the Sushen clan. The text reports that, although the Yilou were subjects of Buyeo, they did not speak the same language as the people of Buyeo and Goryeo. The text's author did not know the northern extent of Yilou territory, but they reportedly had access to the sea, as they sailed in boats to plunder other kingdoms. The text notes that the Yilou were the most undisciplined of the Eastern Barbarians, as they were the only ones not to use sacrificial vessels for food and drink.

According to the Records of the Three Kingdoms, the Yilou had access to grain, cattle, horses, and sackcloth, and they produced red jade and good-quality sable skins, for which they were well known. The Yilou were talented archers and had a tendency to poison their arrowtips so that anyone they hit with their arrows died. They raised pigs for food and clothing, and they smeared themselves with pig fat in winter to protect themselves from the cold. Settlements were centred around pig pens, and homes were typically pit houses, with those of the wealthy families descending as far as nine steps below ground. They apparently had no single ruler; instead, each settlement had its own head (Chinese: 大人; pinyin: dàren).

== See also ==
- Jurchen people – Tungusic-speaking people in East Asia
- Manchu people – East Asian ethnic group
- Mohe people – Ancient ethnic group who lived in Northeast Asia
- Sushen – Ancient ethnic group
