= Buru of Buyeo =

King of Bukbuyeo and Dongbuyeo

Hae Buru of Buyeo 부여 해부루

2nd King of Bukbuyeo
- Predecessor: Hae Mosu of Bukbuyeo
- Successor: Dynasty abolished

1st King of Dongbuyeo
- Predecessor: Dynasty established
- Successor: Hae Geumwa of Dongbuyeo
- Born: c. 86 BCE; Kingdom of Bukbuyeo
- Died: c. 48 BCE; Kingdom of Dongbuyeo
- Issue: 1. Geumwa of Dongbuyeo; 2. Wutae
- House: House of Hae
- Father: Hae Mosu
- Mother: Lady Yuhwa

- Buru of Buyeo
- Hangul: 해부루
- Hanja: 解夫婁
- RR: Hae Buru
- MR: Hae Puru

Hae Buru (Korean: 해부루; Hanja: 解夫婁; 86 – 48 BCE) was king of Bukbuyeo and founder of Dongbuyeo (86 BCE – 22 CE), an ancient Korean kingdom.

Hae Buru took the throne and became the king of Bukbuyeo. Hae Buru led his followers and some of Bukbuyeo people to the city of Gaseopwon, a city near the Sea of Japan (East Korean Sea). In that same year, Hae Buru founded another Buyeo, which he named Dongbuyeo, due to its position east of Bukbuyeo.

According to the Samguk yusa, Aranbul, a minister of the Buyeo court, had a dream in which the Heavenly Emperor told him that Buyeo was to make way for the descendants of Heaven, and believing that the dream was a sort of omen, he advised his king Buru to move the capital. Buru later moved his capital to Gaseopwon (迦葉原), and named his country Dongbuyeo.

Hae Buru's wives apparently were not able to produce a male heir for Hae Buru until he was in old age. Hae Buru eventually got a son, Geumwa, of whom he trained and grew into his successor. When Hae Buru died in 48 BCE, Geumwa rose to the throne by proclaiming himself "King of Dongbuyeo."

== In popular culture ==
- Hae Buru was portrayed by Park Geun-hyung in the 2006–2007 MBC TV series Jumong.

== See also ==
- List of Korean monarchs
- History of Korea
- Dongbuyeo

Regnal titles
Preceded by None	Rulers of Dongbuyeo (Dongbuyeo); 86 BCE –48 BCE	Succeeded by Geumwa of Dongbuyeo
