= Habaek =

Korean god of the Amnok River

- God of Amnok River
- Member of Goguryeo pantheon
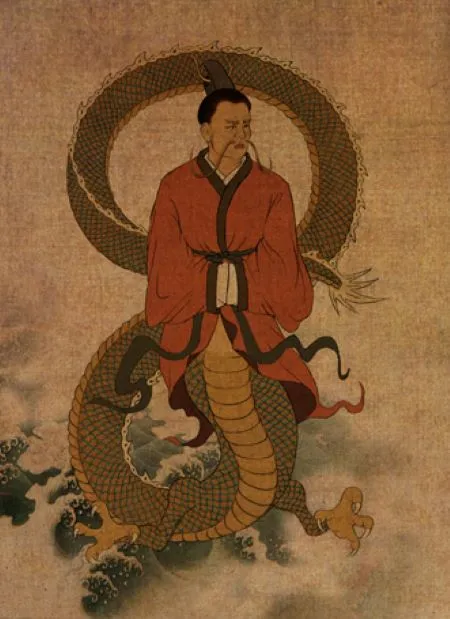
- Habaek, the god of the Amnok River
- Other names

Korean name
- Hangul: 하백
- Hanja: 河伯
- RR: Habaek
- MR: Habaek
- IPA: [ha.bɛk]

Alternate name
- Hangul: 하박; 해밝
- Hanja: 河泊
- RR: Habak; Haebak
- MR: Habak; Haebak
- IPA: [ha.bak]; [hɛ.bak]
- Venerated in: Goguryeo
- Abode: Amnok River
- Gender: Male
- Region: Goguryeo
- Ethnic group: Goguryeo peoples

Genealogy
- Children: Yuhwa

Equivalents
- Chinese: Hebo
- Japanese: Kahaku

Habaek (Korean: 하백; Hanja: 河伯), also known as Habak (Korean: 하박; Hanja: 河泊) is the Goguryeo god of the Amnok River or, according to an alternative interpretation, the sun god Haebalk (Korean: 해밝). According to legend, his daughter Yuhwa married Haemosu and gave birth to Dongmyeong of Goguryeo, the founder of Goguryeo.

== Mythological overview ==
Habaek, the god of the Amnok River, had three daughters: Yuhwa (Korean: 유화; Hanja: 柳花), Wuihwa (Korean: 위화; Hanja: 葦花), and Hweonhwa (Korean: 훤화; Hanja: 萱花). The eldest of his daughters, Yuhwa, was confronted by Hae Mo-su while she was bathing in a river, and eventually she married him without her father's permission. Outraged by the act, Yuhwa's father challenged Hae Mo-su to a duel of metamorphosis.

Habaek transformed into a carp, a deer, and a quail, only to be caught by Hae Mo-su when he transformed into an otter, a wolf, and a hawk respectively. Defeated and recognizing Hae Mo-su's supremacy, Habaek consented to the marriage.

However, after the official marriage ceremony was held, Yuhwa escaped Hae Mo-su's chariot before they could ascend to heaven and she returned to her father. Because his daughter's actions brought disgrace to him, Habaek had his lips stretched out and he exiled her to a stream in Dongbuyeo, condemning her to a mortal life. Yuhwa was later freed by fishermen, who brought her to the local king, Geumwa, and she later gave birth to Chumong.

== Inspiration ==
He is often compared to the Chinese god Hebo due to the same spelling in Chinese characters. However, the two gods are considered as separate deities, since Habaek is the god of Amnok (Yalu) River where Hebo is the god of Yellow River. The story of Habaek also lacks mentions of Hebo's accomplishments (and vice versa) which are integral to his identity such as the Heavenly Questions, only discussing individuals who are important to the history of Korea.

Similar to Interpretatio graeca in the West, it is believed that Habaek borrowed the name from Hebo and was inspired by his concept of being a river god, but was seen as a separate and autonomous god of the Goguryeo people and their Amnok River (equivalent to Hebo and the Han Chinese to their Yellow River).

== Etymology ==
Unlike China's Hebo, Habaek goes through several names including Habaek "河伯", Habak "河泊" and Haebalk "해밝", interchanging when necessary and depending on the source. In fact, the Chinese characters for Habaek, "河伯/河泊" is used as a general title that means "River God" in Asian mythology, not specifically alluding to the Chinese god, Hebo (see Hebo's etymology) as the character "河 (Ha)" was alluding to the Amnok River, previously known as "Cheongha (靑河) River", and not the Yellow River. The same is applied to Japan's Kawa-no-kami, also known as Kahaku (河伯) (see Kawa-no-kami's etymology).

This applies the same for Habaek's other name Haebalk "해밝", which literally means "bright sun" in native Korean, alluding to being a general term for a "Sun God". This aligns with Lady Yuhwa's pregnancy story where she bore Chumong after the sunlight touched her uterus being the daughter of a sun god.

== Legacy ==
King Dongmyeong (Chumong)'s descendants of Goguryeo worshiped Habaek due to his importance in Chumong's conception story and also for being a god. This was later carried over to the Baekje people as King Onjo (the second son of Chumong) was also originally from Goguryeo and was also related to Habaek.

Habaek is also mentioned in the Shoku Nihongi when Emperor Kanmu talks about his mother's lineage.

== In popular culture ==
- Portrayed by Park Young-tae in the 2006 MBC drama Jumong.
- Portrayed by Nam Joo-hyuk in the 2017 tvN Monday-Tuesday drama The Bride of Habaek.

== See also ==
- Lady Yuhwa
- Hae Mo-su
- Hebo - Chinese god of the Yellow River which Habaek took heavy inspirations from.
- Kawa-no-Kami - Also known as Kahaku. Japanese god of rivers.
