= Hae Mo-su of Buyeo =

Korean historical figure

Hae Mo-su
- Successor: Dongmyeong of Goguryeo
- Spouse: Lady Yuhwa

- Hae Mo-su of Buyeo
- Hangul: 해모수
- Hanja: 解慕漱
- RR: Hae Mosu
- MR: Hae Mosu

Hae Mo-su (Korean: 해모수; Hanja: 解慕漱) was the founder of Buyeo. According to the Samguk sagi, Hae Mo-su was the father of Goguryeo's founder, Ko Chumong (Korean: 주몽; Hanja: 朱蒙) also known as Dongmyeong of Goguryeo. According to the Samguk yusa, Hae Mo-su was the son of heaven, riding in a chariot of five dragons, to establish Bukbuyeo (Northern Buyeo).

== Connection with Jumong ==
According to legend, Chumong is the child of Hae Mo-su and Yuhwa, daughter of Habaek, the Goguryeo god of the Amnok River or according to an alternative interpretation, the sun god Haebalk (Korean: 해밝).

Hae Mo-su does not appear in older Chinese records or on the Gwanggaeto Stele that describes the founding of Goguryeo. It is thought that Goguryeo integrated the founding legend of Buyeo after the former conquered the latter.

== Family ==
- Consorts: Lady Yuhwa (유화부인)
  - Son: Buru of Buyeo (해부루)
  - Son: Dongmyeong of Goguryeo (동명성왕)

== Popular culture ==
- Portrayed by Huh Joon-ho in the 2006–2007 MBC TV series Jumong.
- Part of the "Heaven's Brethren" item set, a piece of Armor called "Hae Mo-su's Adamant" in the 2000 pc game Diablo II.

== See also ==
- List of Korean monarchs
- History of Korea
