= Xituanshan =

Bronze Age archaeological site in Jilin, China

- 西團山 (Chinese) (Chinese)
- Seodansan
- Location within China
- 43.803352°N 126.497415°E
- Type: Burials
- Periods: Bronze Age 9th-6th centuries BCE.
- Cultures: Xituanshan
- Location: Jilin Province
- Region: Huanxi Township, Chuanying District

Site notes
- Elevation: 196 m (643 ft)
- Area: 80,000 km^{2} (31,000 sq mi)
- Excavation dates: 1948, 1949, 1950
- Discovered: 1930s

Xituanshan

Chinese name
- Traditional Chinese: 西團山
- Simplified Chinese: 西团山
Transcriptions
Standard Mandarin
- Hanyu Pinyin: Xītuánshān

Korean name
- Hangul: 서단산
- Hanja: 西團山
Transcriptions
- Revised Romanization: Seodansan
- McCune–Reischauer: Sŏdansan

Xituanshan (Chinese: 西团山; pinyin: Xī tuánshān, Korean: 서단산; Hanja: 西團山, 9th-6th centuries BCE) is a Late Bronze Age group of stone burials in Jilin, China. It was designated a Major National Historical and Cultural Site by the Chinese government in 2001.

The site gave its name to a particular style of objects and architecture called the Xituanshan Culture, distributed throughout Jilin, Changchun and southern Heilongjiang.

== Site ==
Xituanshan is a low-lying granite mountain to the west of Jilin City that faces Dongtuanshan across the Songhua River. Together, the two mountains were referred to in the past as the twin tuanshan peaks (Chinese: 团山相峙).

The site comprises 11 gulleys on Xituanshan's southwest slope, over which nine stone cist tombs are distributed. On excavation, various stone tools, pottery pieces, pig jaws, and pig tusks were found. In two graves, remains of plant seeds were found in pots: Setaria lutescens and Eriochloa villosa have been suggested to be wild ancestors of Foxtail millet and Broomcorn millet, which has been used to suggest that the people buried at Xituanshan practised agriculture.

=== Excavation ===
Surveys were conducted on Xituanshan during the 1930s by Japanese archaeologist Mikami Tsugio and Chinese archaeologist Li Wenxin. In 1948 and 1949, researchers from Northeastern University's History Department conducted excavations on burials. In 1950, the new government formally established a Northeast Archaeology Group headed by Pei Wenzhong, which also conducted excavations and excavated the tombs.

== Culture ==
A total of 116 cemeteries and settlements have been identified as having similar architecture or object styles to those found at Xituanshan; these are collectively referred to as the Xituanshan Culture. Only 20 sites have been excavated, the majority of which are centred on Jilin City.

Most sites are found in the regions of Siping and Liaoyuan in Jilin Province, and southern Heilongjiang, in addition to neighbouring areas. Chinese archaeologist Jin Xudong has suggested that the Dongliao River marks the northern boundary of the Xituanshan Culture, where its people interacted with the Baoshan Culture (Chinese: 宝山文化; pinyin: Bǎoshān wénhuà). The Xituanshan Culture is thought to have developed from local Neolithic cultures.

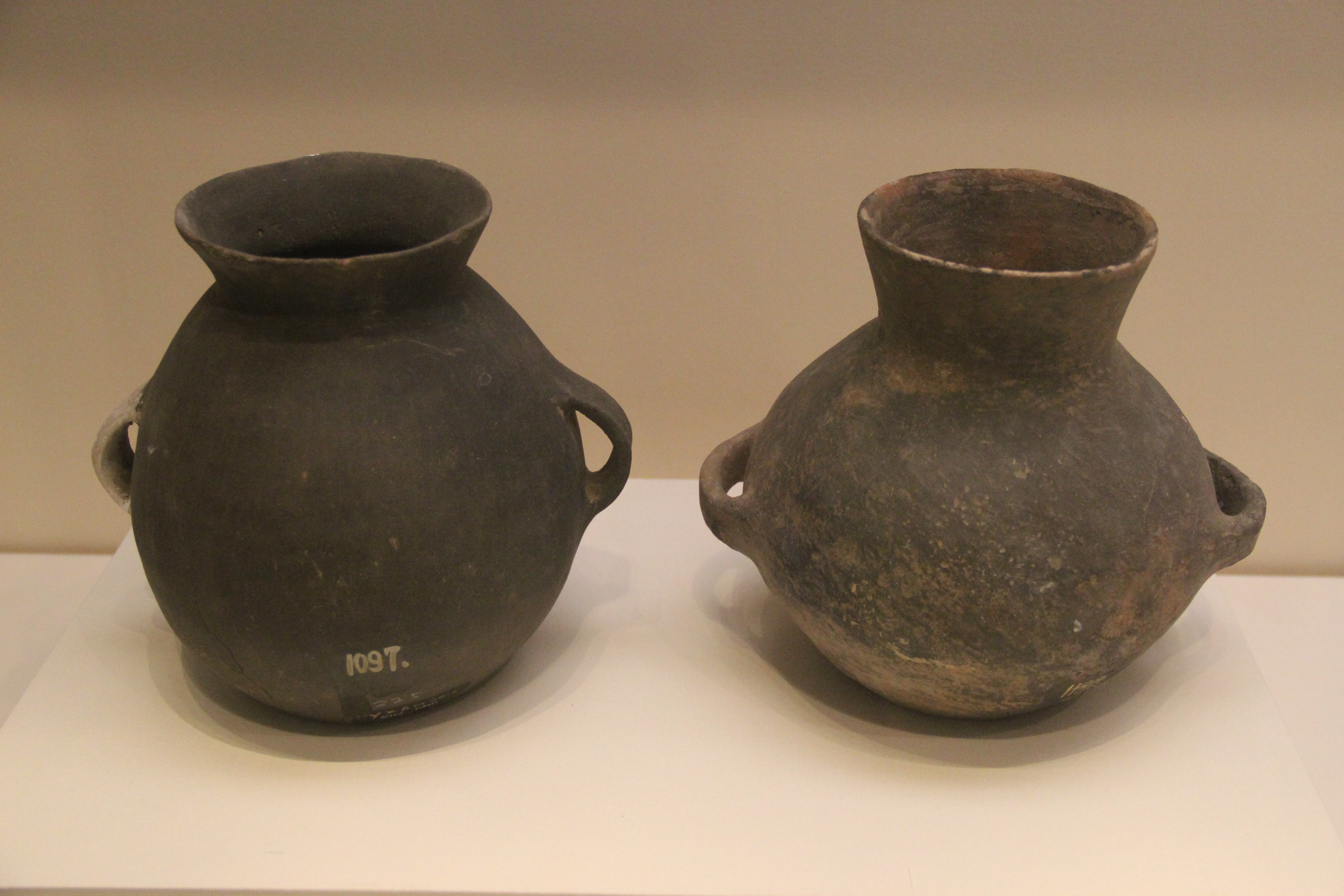
Xituanshan culture pottery

People hunted and fished, as suggested by finds of wild animal bones and fish hooks; however, mortars and grind stones have also been excavated, which suggest that people practised agriculture. While only wild plant species have been found at Xituanshan site, domesticated species of plants have been found in Middle Period settlements. In 1980, excavators also discovered carbonised soy beans at Yangdun Damenghai.

=== Structures ===
Xituanshan buildings were made up to 1.5 m below ground level against mountain rock surfaces or using overlapping stones. People also engineered their environments, as shown by a retaining wall built at Houshishan to protect the settlement from water run-off and soil creep. Buildings at several sites located on hills or promontories also appear to have been enclosed by defensive earthen walls.

Grave walls were constructed using stone slabs or piles of smaller stones, but earth tombs appear in the Late Period. Young infants were buried in jars.

=== Artifacts ===
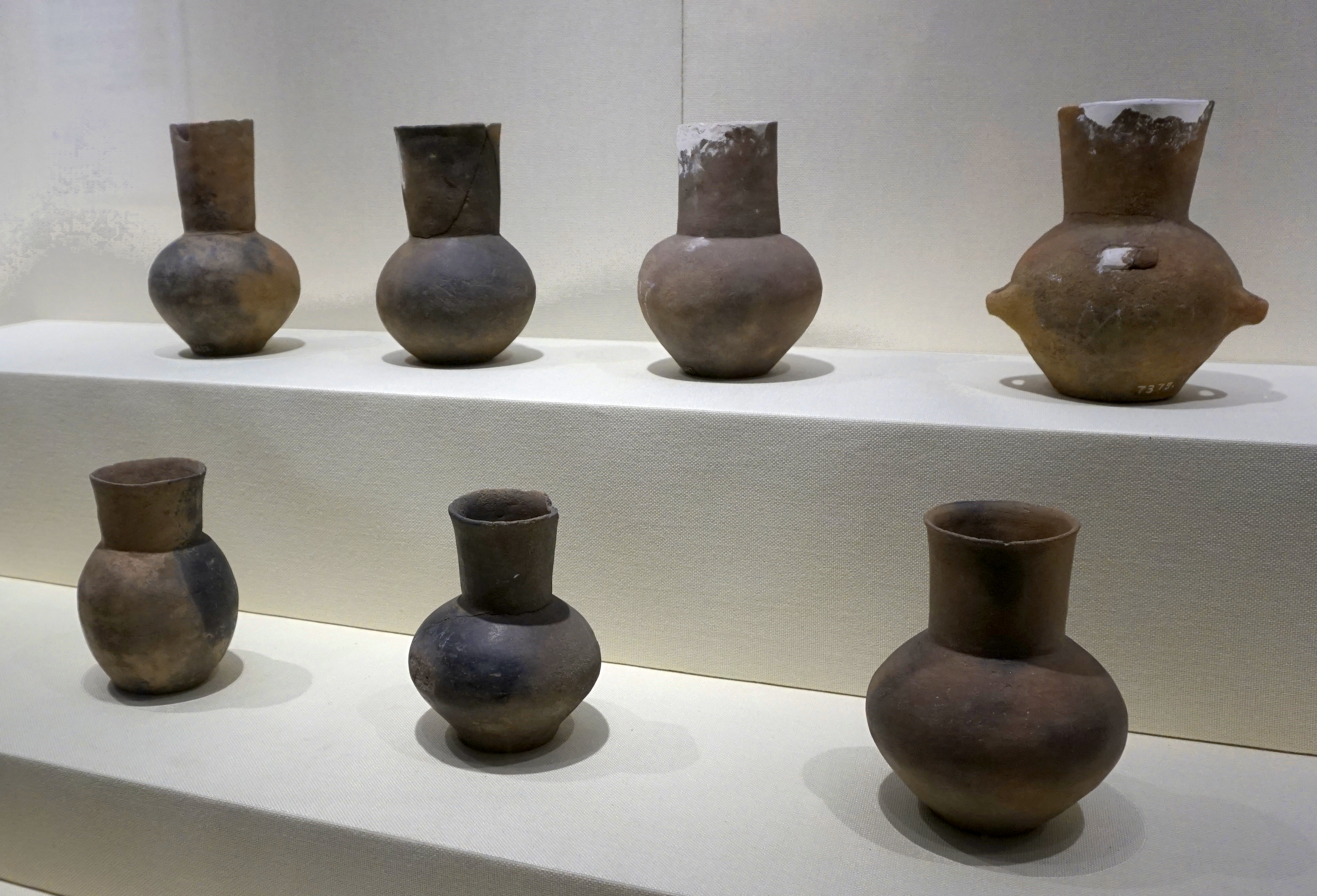
Ceramic pots from Houshishan in the Jilin Provincial Museum

Objects excavated include stone, textile, and bronze. Textiles made from hemp, goat, and dog hair were excavated from graves at Houshishan and Xingxingshao. Bronze artefacts are predominantly small weapons and tools, such as axes, blades, arrows, mirrors, and fish hooks, as well as decorative beads. Small bracelets made from bronze pieces and wooden combs decorated with bronze are particular to the site and are not found elsewhere in the region at the same time. Jade axes and beads have also been found, in addition to awls made from deer antler and ornaments made from pig tusks.

=== Chronology ===
The Xituanshan culture is divided into three periods according to radiocarbon dates, and these periods are represented by different sites:

- Early Period (1275–1105 BCE):
  - Xingxingshao (星星哨)
  - Xituanshan
- Middle Period (465–315, 395–245 BCE):
  - Houshishan (猴石山)
  - Changsheshan (长蛇山)
- Late Period (290–140 BCE):
  - Tuchengzi (土城子)
  - Yangdun Dahaimeng (杨屯大海猛)

== See also ==
- History of Manchuria
- Liaoning bronze dagger culture
- Mumun pottery period
