= Lady Yuhwa =

Korean noblewoman

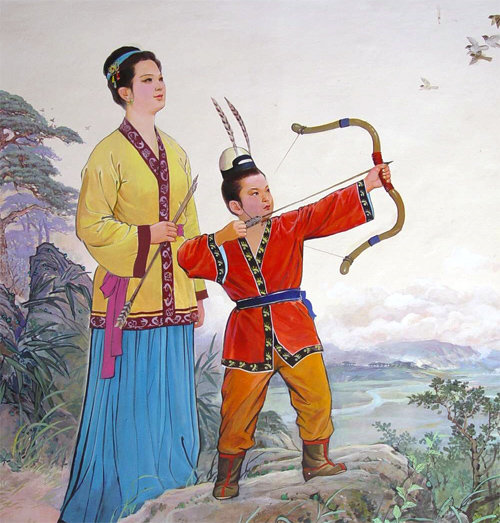
- Lady Yuhwa and young Ko Chumong
- Died: B.C. 24; Buyeo
- Burial: Buyeo
- Issue: Dongmyeong of Goguryeo
- Father: Habaek

- Lady Yuhwa
- Hangul: 하백녀
- Hanja: 河伯女
- Revised Romanization: Habaengnyeo
- McCune–Reischauer: Habaengnyŏ

Birth name
- Hangul: 하유화
- Hanja: 河柳花
- Revised Romanization: Ha Yuhwa
- McCune–Reischauer: Ha Ryuhwa

Habaengnyeo (Korean: 하백녀; Hanja: 河伯女) or Habaengnyeorang (Korean: 하백녀랑; Hanja: 河伯女郞) was the daughter of Habaek (Korean: 하백; Hanja: 河伯), and the mother of Dongmyeong of Goguryeo (Ko Chumong), the founder of the kingdom of Goguryeo. She was also given the name Yuhwa (Korean: 유화; Hanja: 柳花) in Samguk Sagi and Samguk Yusa.

Lady Yu-hwa was posthumously worshipped as one of Goguryeo's national gods along with her son, King Dongmyeong, and identified with Susin (Korean: 수신; Hanja: 隧神; lit. 'Cave deity'), the goddess of caves.

== Mythological overview ==
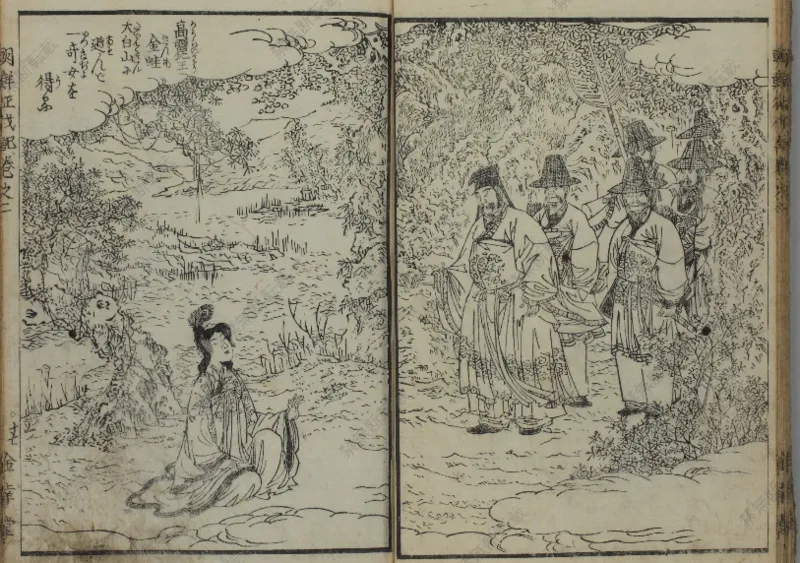
Lady Yuhwa being found by King Geumwa by Sadahide in his book Chōsenseihatsuki (1854)

Habaek, the god of the Amnok River, had three beautiful daughters: Yuhwa, Hwonhwa (Korean: 훤화; Hanja: 萱花), and Wihwa (Korean: 위화; Hanja: 葦花). The sisters were playing on the riverside, but ran away when they saw Hae Mo-su (Korean: 해모수; Hanja: 解慕漱) approaching them. To lure the ladies, Hae Mo-su built an exquisitely decorated palace and held a banquet. After the sisters came into the palace and became drunk, Hae Mo-su attempted to block the exit, and was able to capture Yuhwa.

Outraged by kidnapping of Yuhwa, Habaek sent his messenger to scold Hae Mo-su. Ashamed by his own actions, Hae Mo-su tried to let Yuhwa go, but Yuhwa refused to leave because she had fallen in love with him. To solve the problem, Hae Mo-su summoned a chariot drawn by five dragons and went to Habaek's palace. When they arrived, Habaek challenged Hae Mo-su to a duel of metamorphosis.

Habaek transformed into a carp, a pheasant, and a deer, only to be caught by Hae Mo-su when he transformed into an otter, a hawk, and a wolf respectively. Witnessing the talent of Hae Mo-su, Habaek held a banquet to celebrate the marriage. Once the couple became drunk, Habaek put them into a leather bag, and loaded it into the dragon chariot to ascend the couple to Heaven. However, Hae Mo-su woke up in the middle of the journey, and ran away to Heaven alone by cutting the leather bag with Yuhwa's golden hairpin.

When Yuhwa came back alone, Habaek saw her as a disgrace to the family. Habaek had her lips stretched out, and exiled her to Wubalsu or Wubal Pond (Korean: 우발수; Hanja: 優渤水), located at the south of Taebaeksan or Taebaek Mountain (Korean: 태백산; Hanja: 太白山) along with two servants.

One day a fisherman reported to Geumwa of Buyeo that a strange creature was strolling underwater. The king ordered the capture of the creature, and Yuhwa was pulled out from the water. Because her lips were stretched, they had to be cut three times for her to speak. The king realized that she was the concubine of Son of the Heaven, thus kept her in a detached palace where the sunlight followed Yuhwa and made her pregnant.

== Family ==
- Father: Habaek (하백)
  - Sister: Wihwa (위화)
  - Sister: Hweonhwa (훤화)
  - Husband: Hae Mo-su of Buyeo (해모수왕)
    - Son: Buru of Buyeo (해부루)
    - Son: Dongmyeong of Goguryeo (동명성왕)

== Popular culture ==
- Portrayed by Oh Yeon-soo in the 2006–2007 MBC TV series Jumong.

== Sources ==
- Samguk Yusa, by Il-yeon

== See also ==
- List of Korean monarchs
- History of Korea
- Three Kingdoms of Korea
