= List of Goguryeo people =

This is a partial list of people who lived in Goguryeo from 37 BCE-668 CE and those of Goguryeo descent.

== Rulers ==
Goguryeo (37 BC - 668 CE) was one of the Three Kingdoms of Korea. Goguryeo rulers may have used the title of Taewang (太王, "Greatest King").

#	Posthumous name	Hangul (Hanja)	Personal names	Period of reign
Legendary line
1	Dongmyeong	동명성왕 (東明聖王), 동명왕 (東明王)	Jumong 주몽 (朱蒙), Chumo 추모 (鄒牟), Sanghae 상해 (象解)	37-19 BCE
2	Yuri	유리왕 (琉璃王), 유리명왕 (琉璃明王)	Yuri 유리 (琉璃, 類利), Yuryu 유류 (孺留), Nuri 누리 (累利)	19 BCE - 18 CE
3	Daemusin	대무신왕 (大武神王), 대해주류왕 (大解朱留王)	Muhyul 무휼 (無恤)	18-44
4	Minjung	민중왕 (閔中王)	Saekju 색주 (色朱)	44-48
5	Mobon	모본왕 (慕本王)	U 우 (憂), Aeru 애루 (愛婁), Mangnae 막래 (莫來)	48-53
Great Imperial line
6	Taejo	태조[대]왕 (太祖[大]王), 국조왕 (國祖王)	Gung 궁 (宮), Eosu 어수 (於漱)	53-146
7	Chadae	차대왕 (次大王)	Suseong 수성 (遂成)	146-165
8	Sindae	신대왕 (新大王)	Baekgo 백고 (伯固), Baekgu 백구 (伯句)	165-179
Hwando-Guknae line
9	Gogukcheon	고국천왕 (故國川王), 국양왕 (國襄王)	Nammu 남무 (男武)	179-197
10	Sansang	산상태왕 山上太王	Jeong-u 정우 廷優, Wigung 위궁 位宮	197-227
11	Dongcheon	동천왕 東川王, 東襄王	Uwigeo 우위거 憂位居, Gyoche 교체 郊彘	227-248
12	Jungcheon	중천왕 中川王, 中襄王	Yeonbul 연불 然弗	248-270
13	Seocheon	서천왕 西川王, 西襄王	Yangno 약로 藥盧, Yagu 약우 若友	270-292
14	Bongsang	봉상왕 烽上太王, 鴙葛王	Sangbu 상부 相夫, Sapsiru 삽시루 插矢婁	292-300
15	Micheon	미천왕 美川太王, 好攘王	Eulbul 을불 乙弗, Ubul 우불 憂拂	300-331
16	Gogugwon	고국원왕 故國原王	Sayu 사유 斯由, Yu 유 劉, Soe 쇠 釗	331-371
17	Sosurim	소수림왕 小獸林王	Gubu 구부 丘夫	371-384
18	Gogugyang	고국양왕 故國攘王	Yiryeon 이련 伊連, Eojiji 어지지 於只支	384-391
19	Gwanggaeto the Great	국강상광개토경평안호태왕 國彊上廣開土境平安好太王	Damdeok 담덕 談德, An 안 安	391-413
Pyongyang line
20	Jangsu	장수태왕 長壽太王	Georyeon 거련 巨連, Goryeon 고련 高璉	413-490
21	Munjamyeong	문자명왕 文咨明王	Na-un 나운 羅雲, Go-un 고운 高雲	491-519
22	Anjang	안장왕 安藏王	Heung-an 흥안 興安, Go-an 고안 高安	519-531
23	Anwon	안원왕 安原王	Bojeong 보정 寶廷, Gojeong 고정 高廷	531-545
24	Yangwon	양원왕 陽原王, 陽崗上王	Pyeongseong 평성 平成	545-559
25	Pyeongwon	평원왕 平原王	Yangseong 양성 陽成, Tang 탕 湯, Goyang 고양 高陽	559-590
26	Yeongyang	영양왕 嬰陽王, 평양왕 平陽王	Go Won 고원 高元, Daewon 대원 大元	590-618
27	Yeongnyu	영류왕 營留王	Go Geonmu 고건무 高建武, Seong 성 成, Gomu 고무 高武	618-642
28	Bojang	보장왕 寶藏王	Go Jang 고장 高藏, Bojang 보장 寶藏	642-668

== Royal family ==
- So Seo-no
- Anseung
- Ko Tŏngmu
- Pyeonggang

== Political leaders ==
- Myeongnim Dap-bu
- Ŭl P'aso
- Go Uru
- Myeongnim Eosu
- Eum-u
- Sang-nu
- Ch'ang Chori
- Wang San-ak
- Yŏn Chayu
- Yŏn T'aejo

== Military leaders ==
- Yu Yu
- Mil U
- Yu Ok-gu
- Go Noja
- Gal Ro
- Dae Jo Yeong
- Maeng Gwang
- On Dal
- Ŭlchi Mundŏk
- Kang I-sik
- Yŏn Kaesomun
- Yŏn Namgŏn
- Yŏn Namsaeng
- Yang Manch'un
- Go Yeon-mu
- Geom Mojam
- Bu Wiyeom

== Buddhist monks ==
- Dorim
- Uiyeon
- Damjing
- Hyechong
- Eji
- Hyegwan
- Bodeok

== Other ==
- Go Un
- Yi Jeonggi
- Yi Nab
- Yi Sago
- Yi Sado
- Go Seonji

== See also ==
- List of Silla people
- List of Baekje people
- List of Goryeo people
- List of Joseon people
