= AD 172 =

172 in various calendars
- Gregorian calendar: 172; CLXXII
- Ab urbe condita: 925
- Assyrian calendar: 4922
- Balinese saka calendar: 93–94
- Bengali calendar: −422 – −421
- Berber calendar: 1122
- Buddhist calendar: 716
- Burmese calendar: −466
- Byzantine calendar: 5680–5681
- Chinese calendar: 辛亥年 (Metal Pig); 2869 or 2662 — to — 壬子年 (Water Rat); 2870 or 2663
- Coptic calendar: −112 – −111
- Discordian calendar: 1338
- Ethiopian calendar: 164–165
- Hebrew calendar: 3932–3933
- Hindu calendars
- Vikram Samvat: 228–229
- Shaka Samvat: 93–94
- Kali Yuga: 3272–3273
- Holocene calendar: 10172
- Iranian calendar: 450 BP – 449 BP
- Islamic calendar: 464 BH – 463 BH
- Javanese calendar: 48–49
- Julian calendar: 172; CLXXII
- Korean calendar: 2505
- Minguo calendar: 1740 before ROC 民前1740年
- Nanakshahi calendar: −1296
- Seleucid era: 483/484 AG
- Thai solar calendar: 714–715
- Tibetan calendar: ལྕགས་མོ་ཕག་ལོ་ (female Iron-Boar); 298 or −83 or −855 — to — ཆུ་ཕོ་བྱི་བ་ལོ་ (male Water-Rat); 299 or −82 or −854

Year 172 (CLXXII) was a leap year starting on Tuesday of the Julian calendar. At the time, it was known as the Year of the Consulship of Scipio and Maximus (or, less frequently, year 925 Ab urbe condita). The denomination 172 for this year has been used since the early medieval period, when the Anno Domini calendar era became the prevalent method in Europe for naming years.

== Events ==
=== By place ===
==== Roman Empire ====
- Emperor Marcus Aurelius crosses the Danube with an expeditionary force. He subdues the Marcomanni and their allies and then, in a pact signed with the Germanic tribes, he imports them into the Roman Empire to occupy areas that have been depopulated by the plague.
- The Sarmatians attack the lower Danube frontier.
- Miracle in Moravia: As the Roman army is encircled by the Quadi under intense heat, a violent thunderstorm sweeps away the Quadi in a torrent of water and mud, and refreshes the parched legionaries.
- Avidius Cassius, governor of Syria, suppresses an agrarian revolt in Egypt and is made supreme commander of the Roman army in the East.

==== Egypt ====
- The Bucolic War broke out in Egypt. The Egyptians, led by Isidorus, fought against the Roman Empire under Marcus Aurelius.

==== Asia ====
- Last (5th) year of Jianning era and start of Xiping era of the Chinese Han dynasty.
- Battle of Jwawon: Goguryeo Prime Minister Myeongnim Dap-bu defeats the Chinese Han dynasty forces in Manchuria.

=== By topic ===
==== Religion ====
- Tatian produces his Diatessaron, a harmony of the four gospels.
- Montanism spreads through the Roman Empire.

== Births ==
- Lu Su, Chinese general and politician (d. 217)
- Xu Miao, Chinese official and politician (d. 249)

== Deaths ==
- Dou Miao (or Huansi), Chinese empress
- Hou Lan, Chinese eunuch-official and politician
- Marcus Macrinius Vindex, Roman praetorian prefect
