= Myeongnim Eosu =

Prime Minister of Goguryeo from 230 to 254

- Hangul: 명림어수
- Hanja: 明臨於漱
- RR: Myeongnim Eosu
- MR: Myŏngnim Ŏsu

Myeongnim Eosu (Korean: 명림어수; Hanja: 明臨於漱; ?–254) was the prime minister of Goguryeo during the reigns of Kings Dongcheon and Jungcheon.

== Background ==
Myeongnim Eosu was a member of the Yeonna-Bu Myeongnim House, and possibly related to Myeongnim Dap-bu, the first prime minister of Goguryeo. Myeongnim Eosu is recorded to have served in the government with the position of Wutae before he became prime minister of Goguryeo.

== Prime minister ==
=== Reign of King Dongcheon ===
In the year 230, during the 4th year of the reign of King Dongcheon, prime minister of Goguryeo Go Uru died, and Myeongnim Eosu rose to the position of prime minister. He assisted the King in the Goguryeo-Wei Wars.

=== Reign of King Jungcheon ===
Go Yeon-bul, the son of King Dongcheon, became the 12th ruler of Goguryeo in the year 248, after the death of his father. The prime minister at this time was still Myeongnim Eosu. The new king gave the prime minister responsibilities over military affairs in 250. In 254, Prime Minister Myeongnim Eosu died of unknown causes and was replaced by Eum-u, a Biryu-Bu noble.

== See also ==
- Three Kingdoms of Korea
- Goguryeo

== Sources ==
- Samguk Sagi, Goguryeo Bon-gi

Preceded by Go Uru	Prime Minister of Goguryeo); 230 –254	Succeeded by Eum-u
