= Go Uru =

Prime Minister of Goguryeo (died 230)

- Hangul: 고우루
- Hanja: 高優婁
- RR: Go Uru
- MR: Ko Uru

Go Uru (Korean: 고우루; Hanja: 高優婁; ? – 230) was the prime minister of the ancient Korean kingdom of Goguryeo during the reigns of Kings Sansang and Dongcheon during a period of 24 years.

== Background ==
Go Uru was a descendant of Goguryeo's founder, King Jumong, and of noble origins. However, the exact line of his ancestry or his family are unknown.

== Successor of Eul Pa-So ==
After the death of prime minister Ŭl P'a-so in the year 203, King Sansang gave the position of Prime Minister to Go Uru. Go Uru remained prime minister for 24 years until his death in 230. Go Uru was succeeded by Wutae Myeongnim Eosu.

== See also ==
- Three Kingdoms of Korea
- Goguryeo

Preceded by Ŭl P'a-so	Prime Minister of Goguryeo; 203 –230	Succeeded by Myeongnim Eosu
