= Gaeru =

Gaeru may refer to:

- Dokonjō Gaeru (Gutsy Frog) a manga/anime
- Alternative spelling for Gyeru (Gyeh-ru/Gyeh-Ru)
- Gaeru of Baekje - Historical Korean king
