= Queen U of Goguryeo =

Queen consort of Goguryeo (c. 160–234)

Queen U 왕후 우씨

Queen consort of Goguryeo
- Tenure: 180–197; 197/8–227

Queen dowager of Goguryeo
- Tenure: 227–234
- Born: c. 160–5; Jenabu or Yeonnabu, Goguryeo
- Died: 234; Goguryeo
- Spouse: Gogukcheon of Goguryeo (m. 180; d. 197); Sansang of Goguryeo (m. 197/8; d. 227)
- House: U clan
- Father: U So

Queen U (Korean: 왕후 우씨; Hanja: 王后 于氏; d. 234), sometimes romanized as Queen Woo, was the queen of Goguryeo as the wife of both King Gogukcheon (Go Nammu) and later his younger brother King Sansang (Go Yeonu). She was famous for maintaining supreme authority. Her second marriage is a well-known example of Goguryeo's levirate marriage custom.

== Life ==
=== During King Gogukcheon's reign ===
Lady U was the daughter of U So (우소; 于素). Her birthplace is unclear, but it may have been the region of Jenabu (제나부; 提那部) or Yeonnabu (연나부; 椽那部). She was married to King Gogukcheon in 180 AD and became his queen consort soon afterwards. However, a rebellion began in 190 when the king tried to stop Lady U's relatives (including Eobiryu and Jwagaryeo) from abusing their power. King Gogukcheon died without issue in 197.

=== During King Sansang's reign ===
After King Gogukcheon's death, Queen U met with his brother Prince Balgi to discuss the throne's successor. Balgi believed that he would ascend to the throne, and his ill-mannered behavior and ambition disconcerted U. U later met with Balgi's younger brother Prince Yeonu, whom, unlike Balgi, she found polite and courteous. U chose to support Yeonu and plotted to accuse Balgi of treason.

According to the historical source Samguk sagi, during the ensuing conflict, Yeonu was injured by a knife, and U loosened her skirt scrap and used the fabric to cover the wound. The two then returned to the palace hand-in-hand. Meanwhile, Balgi fled in anger to Liaodong and requested support from Gongsun Du, head of the Gongsun clan. Gongsun Du loaned Balgi 30,000 troops to invade Gorguryeo. Knowing this, Balgi's youngest brother, Prince Gyesu, successfully defeated Balgi's forces. Balgi then committed suicide due to his guilt for bringing a great crisis to his royal family and country.

After Balgi's death, Yeonu ascended the throne as King Sansang with Queen U's support and eventually made her his primary spouse, or the queen consort, later that year. However, Sansang and U were not able not have children. After praying in a mountain at night, Sansang received a prophecy that he would have a son with another woman.

Upon knowing that her husband had a relationship with another woman, U became very angry and sent many soldiers to kill this woman. However, the woman was pregnant with Sansang's son, and the soldiers refused to kill her for the sake of the unborn child. Sansang later formally made this woman a concubine with the title "Little Queen" (소후; 小后). Not long after this, the Little Queen gave birth to a boy, Uwigeo, in 209, and she and Uwigeo continued to face pressure and threats from U. Four years later, Uwigeo was named the crown prince.

=== During King Dongcheon's reign ===
After King Sansang died in 227, Prince Uwigeo ascended the throne as King Dongcheon, despite U's plotting against him since he was young. As a test of his generosity and patience, she once had him cut the mane of his horse, and on another occasion she ordered a servant to spill soup on his clothes. Despite this, Dongcheon was never angry. Rather than retaliate against U, he granted her clan political influence by appointing them to the highest position of state minister, and he continued to honour her as the queen dowager (왕태후; 王太后).

U remained the queen dowager until her own death in 234, the eighth year King Dongcheon's reign. Just before her death, she wrote a letter requesting that she be buried next to Sansang's tomb instead of Gogukcheon's tomb. When King Dongcheon read this, he planted seven layers of pine trees around Gogukcheon's tomb to hide and cover it.

== In popular culture ==
- Portrayed in the 2020 manhwa The Queen's Empire.
- Portrayed by Jeon Jong-seo in the 2024 TVING series Queen Woo.
