= Buyeo (disambiguation) =

Buyeo (夫餘) was an ancient kingdom in Northeast Asia.

Buyeo may also refer to:

- Buyeo County, in South Chungcheong Province, South Korea
- Buyeo language, the language of the Buyeo kingdom
- Fuyu, Jilin, a city in Jilin Province, China
- Queen Mother Buyeo
