= Levirate marriage =

Obligatory marriage between a widow and a brother of the deceased

Levirate marriage is a type of marriage in which the brother of a deceased man is obliged to marry his widowed sister-in-law. Levirate marriage has been practiced by societies where exogamous marriage (i.e. marriage outside the clan) is forbidden.

== Etymology ==
The term levirate is derived from the Latin lēvir, meaning "husband's brother;" it is unrelated to Leviticus or Levite.

== Background and rationale ==
Levirate marriage can, at its most positive, serve as protection for the widow and her children, ensuring that they have a male provider and protector. Levirate marriage can be a positive in a society where women must rely on men to provide for them, especially in societies where women are under the authority of, dependent on, in servitude to or regarded as possessions of their husbands, and to ensure the survival of the clan. The practice of levirate marriage is strongly associated with patriarchal societies. The practice was extremely important in ancient times (e.g., Ancient Near East), and remains so today in parts of the world. Having children enables the inheritance of land, which offers security and status.

A levirate marriage might only occur if a man died childless, in order to continue his family line. The anthropologist Ruth Mace also found that the practice of widow inheritance by younger brothers, common in many parts of Africa, serves to reduce population growth, as these men will be forced to marry older (and hence, less fertile) women.

== Judaism ==
In the Hebrew Bible, a form of levirate marriage, called yibbum, is mentioned in Deuteronomy 25:5–10, under which the brother of a man who dies without children is permitted and encouraged to marry the widow. Either of the parties may refuse to go through with the marriage, but then both must go through a ceremony, known as halizah, involving a symbolic act of renunciation of a yibbum marriage. Sexual relations with one's brother's wife are otherwise forbidden by Leviticus 18 and Leviticus 20.

Jewish custom has seen a gradual decline of yibbum in favor of halizah, to the point where in most contemporary Jewish communities, and in Israel by mandate of the Chief Rabbinate, yibbum is prohibited.

This started already in time of Mishnah, "The opinion of Abba Shaul, who said, 'The mitzvah of ḥalitza takes precedence over the mitzvah of levirate marriage'" (Yebamot 3a). "Now that they do not have intent for the sake of fulfilling the mitzvah, the Sages say, The mitzvah of performing ḥalitza takes precedence over the mitzvah of consummating the levirate marriage" (Babylonian Talmud, Yebamot 39b). In Yemen, however, the practice of Levirate marriage was observed by the Jewish community there until their immigration to the Land of Israel. In 1950, the Rabbinate of Israel, along with the Chief Sephardic Rabbi, forbade its practice amongst the Yemenites, citing a need for "uniformity amongst the Jewish groups," and only permitted those who were already married through levirate marriage from outside the country.

== Islam ==
Islamic law (Sharia) clearly lays down rules for marriage, including who may marry whom, and although the Quran does not prohibit a man from marrying his brother's widow, it does insist that if it were to be done, it should be treated as a normal marriage with the wife's consent and additional mahr.

O you who have believed, it is not lawful for you to inherit women by compulsion. And do not make difficulties for them in order to take [back] part of what you gave them unless they commit a clear immorality. And live with them in kindness. For if you dislike them – perhaps you dislike a thing and Allah makes therein much good.

— al-Nisa 4:19, Sahih International translation

While not being an Islamic tradition in and of itself, it has historically been widespread in the muslim world and is deemed permissible, with the consent of the wife, by most Muslim scholars, and is even recommended, depending on the circumstance, by some.

It has recently come under strict scrutiny in some parts of the world like Afghanistan, under the Taliban.

== Eurasia ==
=== Scythia ===
The levirate custom was revived in Scythia if there were shaky economic conditions in the decedent's family. Khazanov, citing [Abramzon, 1968, p. 289 - 290], mentions that during World War II, the levirate was resurrected in Central Asia. In these circumstances, adult sons and brothers of the deceased man held themselves responsible to provide for his dependents. One of them would marry the widow and adopt her children, if there were any.

=== Central Asia and Xiongnu ===
The levirate custom survived in the society of Northeastern Caucasus Huns until the 7th century CE. The Armenian historian Movses Kalankatuatsi states that the Savirs, one of Hunnish tribes in the area, were usually monogamous, but sometimes a married man would take his brother's widow as a polygynous wife. Ludmila Gmyrya, a Dagestani historian, asserts that the levirate survived into "ethnographic modernity" (from the context, probably 1950s). Kalankatuatsi describes the form of levirate marriage practised by the Huns. As women had a high social status, the widow had a choice whether to remarry or not. Her new husband might be a brother or a son (by another woman) of her first husband, so she could end up marrying her brother-in-law or stepson; the difference in age did not matter. Hungarians also practiced levirate marriages. Koppány's rebellion against the Christian king Stephen I and claim to marry Sarolt, the widow of his relative Géza, was qualified as an incestuous attempt by 14th-century Hungarian chronicles, but was fully in line with the pagan custom.

=== India ===
In 2017, the Indian Army removed a rule which restricted payment of monetary allowances to widows of gallantry awardees if she marries someone other than the late husband's brother. Previously, the payment of an allowance was continued until her death or until she re-married, unless the new husband was the late husband's brother.

The most famous instance of levirate marriage in India was the wedding of the Panchala princess Draupadi to the five Pandava brothers. It is a main plot point of the epic Mahabharata, though heavily discussed in the text as being controversial. (Polygamy, however, was common at the time.)

=== Indonesia ===
According to the adat (customary practice) of the Karo people in North Sumatra, Indonesia, polygyny is permitted. A study of Kutagamber, a Karo village in the 1960s, noted one instance of the practice, as a result of levirate. The Indonesian term for it is "turun ranjang" (lit.: get down off one's bed).

=== Japan ===
The Japanese had a custom of levirate marriage called aniyome ni naosu (兄嫁に直す) during the Meiji period.

=== Kurds ===
Levirate marriages among the Kurds are very common and also among the Kurds in Turkey, especially in Mardin. Levirate is practised in Kurdistan: a widowed woman stays with her husband's family. If she is widowed when her children are young, she is obliged to marry her deceased husband's brother. This form of marriage is called levirate. Sororate marriage is another custom: When a man loses his wife before she bears a child or she dies leaving young children, her lineage provides another wife to the man, usually a younger sister with a lowered bride price. Both levirate and sororate are practiced to guarantee the well being of children and ensure that any inheritance of land will stay within the family.

=== Kyrgyz ===
"The Kyrgyz people practice levirate whereby the wife of a deceased male is very often married by a younger sibling of the deceased." "Kirghiz ... followed levirate marriage customs, i.e., a widow who had borne at least one child was entitled to a husband from the same lineage as her deceased spouse."

=== Korea ===
The Korean kingdom of Goguryeo also had a custom of levirate marriage. An example of this was king Sansang of Goguryeo marrying the queen of Gogukcheon of Goguryeo, who was his older brother's wife.

=== Manchu ===
The existence of levirate marriage is supported by the case of Korean Princess Uisun who was brought to the Later Jin dynasty to marry the Manchu prince Dorgon and married his nephew after he died.

== Africa ==
=== Central African Republic ===
Levirate marriage is commonly practiced among Goula who mostly live in northern part of Central African Republic.

=== Cameroon ===
Among the Mambila of northern Cameroon, in regard to "Inheritance of wives: both levirates are practised throughout the tribe".

=== Kenya ===
As among the Maragoli of western Kenya, likewise "in the Luo case widows become mostly remarried to the deceased husband's brother".

In the highlands of Kenya, it is "Nandi custom for a widow to be 'taken over' ... by a brother ... of her deceased husband." "According to customary law, it is tantamount to adultery for a widow to be sexually involved with a man other than a close agnate of her late husband."

=== Nigeria ===
In some parts of Nigeria, it is a common practice for a woman to marry her late husband's brother if she had children. This enabled the children to retain the father's family identity and inheritance. Although less common today, it is still practiced:

Levirate marriage is considered a custom of the Yoruba, the Igbo, and the Hausa-Fulani ... . ... levirate marriages ... are commonest among the [I]gbo ... . ... Under customary law among the Yoruba, ... A brother or son of the deceased husband ... was traditionally allowed to inherit the widow as a wife ... . The inheritance of the youngest wife of the deceased by the eldest son ... continues to be practiced in Yoruba land ... . ... Under Igbo customary law, ... a brother or son of the deceased Igbo husband ... was traditionally allowed to inherit the widow as a wife. Levirate marriage is also considered in the tradition of the Urhobo people, a major ethnic group in the Delta State.

=== Somalia ===
In Somalia, levirate marriage is practiced and is called Dumaal, and provisions are made under Somali customary law or Xeer with regard to bride price (yarad). The widow is usually given a choice in the matter. In the past few decades since the start of the Somali Civil War, this type of marriage has fallen out of favor due to strict Islamic interpretations that have been imported to Somalia.

=== South Sudan ===
Levirate marriages are very common among South Sudan's Nilotic peoples, especially among the Dinka and Nuer people.

An alternate form, the ghost marriage, occurs when a groom dies before marriage. The deceased groom is replaced by his brother who serves as a stand in to the bride; any resulting children are considered children of the deceased spouse.

=== Zimbabwe ===
In Zimbabwe, levirate marriage is practiced amongst the Shona people, and provisions are made under Zimbabwe customary law, with regard to bride price (roora). The widow is usually given a choice in the matter, as well as the widower. In the past few decades, this type of marriage has fallen out of favor due to increased rural-to urban migration as well as improved literacy for women and girls.

== Americas ==
=== Pre-colonial Inca civilization ===
Spanish chronicler, Juan de Betanzos, described the practice of levirate marriage which he saw observed in Peru in the early 16th-century by the people ruled by the Inca: "If the first husband of a woman died and the woman wanted to marry, she would be married to the closest relative of her husband. If children remained from her first husband, she should rear them as her own. If the first husband left no children, the second should be from the same lineage and the lineage would continue and the blood of those of Cuzco would not be mixed with that of some other nation or disappear."

== In popular culture ==
Levirate marriages serve as a plot-element in various works of fiction:

- In William Shakespeare's iconic play Hamlet, the titular character's paternal uncle, Claudius, marries Hamlet's mother, after the death of Hamlet's father. It is later revealed by the late king's ghost that Claudius murdered his brother, in order to seize the throne and marry his sister-in-law.
- The plot of Holy Matrimony (1994) is based on a levirate marriage, but the real-life Hutterites don't have such custom.
- In the TV series Deadwood, Seth Bullock is married to his brother's widow. This is a plot point used to mitigate guilt in the adulterous affair between Alma (another widow), and Seth (2005).
- In the Tamil novel Arukattuthurai (2006), Aruldas, (younger brother of Samuel) marries his sister-in-law Samuthiravalli, nearly three years after Samuel goes missing.
- In A Song of Ice and Fire, Lord Eddard Stark marries his brother Brandon's betrothed, Catelyn Tully after the death of Brandon.
- In Hell on Wheels (2011–2016), it makes mention of Eva's late husband Gregory Toole having killed himself, his brother having tradition to marry her as his brother's widow.

== See also ==
- Avunculate
- Genealogy of Jesus
- Posthumous marriage
- Polyandry
- Polygyny
- Sororate marriage
- Widow conservation
