= Sang-nu =

Prime Minister of Goguryeo from 271 to 294

Prime Minister Sang-nu Kuksang
- 상루

Prime Minister of Goguryeo
- In office 271 BC – 294 BC
- Preceded by: Eum-u
- Succeeded by: Ch'ang Chori

- Sang-nu
- Hangul: 상루
- Hanja: 尙婁
- Revised Romanization: Sang-nu
- McCune–Reischauer: Sangnu

Sang-nu (Korean: 상루; Hanja: 尙婁; died 294) was the prime minister of Goguryeo during the reign of King Seocheon, and the son of previous Prime Minister Eum-u.

== Background ==
Sang-nu, like his father, was from the Biryu-Bu of Goguryeo. His last name and ancestry are also unknown, but it is known that he and his father possessed a considerable amount of power over the nobles. Sang-Noo was the first Prime Minister to have inherited the position of prime minister from his father.

== Life ==
Very little is mentioned on this figure. This lack of mention in historical records may signify that prime minister Sang-nu was an excellent government official, or an incompetent one. This cannot be known. Sang-nu died in the year 294, during the 3rd year of the reign of King Bongsang and was succeeded by Ch'ang Chori.

== See also ==
- Three Kingdoms of Korea
- Goguryeo

== Sources ==
- Samguk Sagi, Goguryeo Bon-Gi

Preceded by Eum-u	Prime Minister of Goguryeo); 271 –294	Succeeded by Ch'ang Chori
