= Eum-u =

Prime Minister of Goguryeo from 254 to 271

- Hangul: 음우
- Hanja: 陰友
- Revised Romanization: Eum-u
- McCune–Reischauer: Ŭmu

Eum-u (Korean: 음우; Hanja: 陰友; ? – 271) was the prime minister of Goguryeo during the reigns of Kings Jungcheon and Seocheon.

== Background ==
Prime Minister Eum-u's last name is unknown, and therefore, his ancestry cannot be traced. It is known, however, that he was from the Biryu-Bu of Goguryeo, and fathered at least one son, Sang-nu, who would succeed Eum-u as prime minister of Goguryeo.

== Life ==
Historical records provide few details on the life and background of prime minister Eum-u. Eum-u became prime minister of Goguryeo in the year 254, succeeding Myeongnim Eosu. The only other fact that is revealed is, Eum-u died in the year 271, and was succeeded by his son Sang-nu.

== See also ==
- Three Kingdoms of Korea
- Goguryeo

== Sources ==
- Samguk Sagi, Goguryeo Bon-Gi

| Preceded by Myeongnim Eosu | Prime Minister of Goguryeo); 254 –271 | Succeeded by Sang-nu |
