= Queen Woo =

2024 South Korean television series

- Promotional poster
- Hangul: 우씨왕후
- Hanja: 于氏王后
- RR: Ussiwanghu
- MR: Ussiwanghu
- Genre: Sageuk; Action
- Written by: Lee Byoung-hak
- Directed by: Jung Se-kyo
- Starring: Jeon Jong-seo; Kim Mu-yeol; Ji Chang-wook; Jeong Yu-mi; Lee Soo-hyuk; Park Ji-hwan
- Country of origin: South Korea
- Original language: Korean
- No. of episodes: 8

Production
- Running time: 50 minutes
- Production companies: Andmarq; Compass Pictures; CJ ENM Studios
- Budget: ₩30 billion

Original release
- Network: TVING
- Release: August 29 – September 12, 2024

Queen Woo (Korean: 우씨왕후) is a 2024 South Korean sageuk television series starring Jeon Jong-seo, Kim Mu-yeol, Ji Chang-wook, Jeong Yu-mi, Lee Soo-hyuk and Park Ji-hwan. The series is about a struggle to establish a new king within 24 hours. It was released on TVING from August 29, to September 12, 2024. It is also available for streaming on Viu and will be on Paramount+ in selected regions.

== Synopsis ==
As soon as the death of King Gogukcheon of Goguryeo is announced, a fierce battle between tribes will begin. Queen Woo, who became the target of five tribes seeking power, struggles to establish a new king within 24 hours. So begins the journey of the life of 'Woo', who became the first woman in history to become queen twice.

== Cast ==
=== Main ===
- Jeon Jong-seo as Woo Hee / Queen Woo of Goguryeo
  - Song Si-an as teen Woo Hee
  - Kim Ha-eun as child Woo Hee

The queen of Goguryeo who has beauty and intelligence. She tries to protect her family and tribe by marrying one of her husband's younger brothers when the king dies.

- Kim Mu-yeol as Eul Pa-so
  - Ahn Seok-hyun as child Eul Pa-so

Prime minister of Goguryeo and the king's soldier.

- Ji Chang-wook as Go Nam-mu / King Gogukcheon of Goguryeo
  - Park Do-ha as teen Go Nam-mu

Woo Hee's husband who is the king of Goguryeo with a brilliant mind.

- Jeong Yu-mi as Woo Sun
  - Jung Ye-na as teen Woo Sun

Woo Hee's older sister and her head maid.

- Lee Soo-hyuk as Go Bal-gi

Third prince of Goguryeo who is one of three candidates for succession to the throne.

- Park Ji-hwan as Mugol

A commander who protects King Go Nam-mu.

=== Supporting ===
- Jeon Bae-soo as Woo So

Head of Woo family, Hee and Sun's father.

- Jo Han-chul as Woo Do

Head of Woo family, So's brother.

- Kim Do-yoon as Song Woo

The king's closest aide.

- Lee Hae-woo as Mochi

A member of the royal guard.

- Kang Young-seok as Go Yeon-u / Sansang of Goguryeo

Fourth prince of Goguryeo.

- Jung Jae-kwang as Go Gye-su

Fifth prince of Goguryeo.

- Song Jae-rim as Go Pae-ui

Dethroned crown prince of Goguryeo.

- Park Jung-won as Yoo-ah

Queen Woo's loyal female warrior.

- Oh Ha-nee as Sa-bi

Head shaman of the royal palace.

- Lee Do-yeop as Myungrim Eoru
- Park Bo-kyung as Yeon Bi

Jolbon's ruler who is trying to destroy the Go royal family.

- Won Hyun-jun as Noe-eum

The leader of the White Tiger Tribe.

== Production ==
Queen Woo was originally supposed to be a two-hour film that director Jung Se-kyo wrote even before he worked as an assistant director on War of the Arrows (2011). When the production decided to make it into a drama, they planned 12 episodes like the twelve hours of the Chinese zodiac, but they were eventually reduced to eight to keep a fast pace. The script was rewritten about 90 times by Lee Byoung-hak over the course of three and a half years.

The production teamed up with historians for the costumes and makeup, and referenced Goguryeo murals for the hairstyles.

Jung Se-kyo explained that he wanted to dramatize Queen Woo's story because he was fascinated by the fact that she chose the king to be crowned with her own hands, instead of remaining helpless in the palace, and by the motive that pushed her to become queen twice. The titular character is played by Jeon Jong-seo, in her first costume drama, who said that she was attracted to Woo Hee "because she is an ambitious, honest and progressive woman," and that she was honored to portray an important figure who had played a key role in Korean history. Kim Mu-yeol was directly approached by the director for the part of Eul Pa-so after having worked together in 2011 in War of the Arrows; Lee Soo-hyuk was instead offered the role of Noe-eum, but the actor insisted on playing Go Bal-gi.

== Reception ==
=== Critical response ===
Upon the release of the first promotional photos, the clothing, hairstyles, and accessories of the main characters were criticized as anachronistic and historically inaccurate for resembling styles from the Chinese Qin dynasty and Warring States period. For instance, the appearance of Eul Pa-so was noted to closely resemble a character from The Qin Empire. Hong Seok-kyung, a professor of journalism and information at Seoul National University, defended the series, stating that some similarities could be plausible and that, since there is no extensive contemporary evidence, the production team was entitled to take creative liberties.

The first part of the series was met with mixed reviews. While some appreciated the female-led narrative, the fast pace, the sets and the fight scenes, others criticized the acting, the low volume of the voices and the gratuitous use of intimate scenes, claiming that they often felt out of place and interrupted the storyline. Reviews have noted an excessive amount of degrading violence against women: an often cited scene is when the king's younger brother, Go Bal-gi, bends his wife over a table and, while having intercourse, impales her in the back with his sword. A few minutes later, he stabs a wall in frustration, accidentally killing a woman on the other side, and orders his guards to chop off the heads of all the remaining maids in the palace. The second part was appreciated for its greater content of action scenes, but the open ending left viewers and critics perplexed. For Pierce Conran of South China Morning Post, the series is dull, dry and confusing.

=== Accolades ===
Award ceremony	Year	Category	Nominee	Result	Ref.
APAN Star Awards	2024	Male Acting Award	Park Ji-hwan	Nominated	
