= Insider (South Korean TV series) =

2022 South Korean television series

- Promotional poster
- Hangul: 인사이더
- RR: Insaideo
- MR: Insaidŏ
- Genre: Action; Suspense thriller
- Written by: Moon Man-se
- Directed by: Min Yeon-hong
- Starring: Kang Ha-neul; Lee Yoo-young; Heo Sung-tae
- Music by: Kim Jun-seok (Movie Closer); Jeong Se-rin (Movie Closer)
- Country of origin: South Korea
- Original language: Korean
- No. of episodes: 16

Production
- Executive producer: Hwang Ra-kyung
- Producers: Min Hyun-il; Lee Seong-jin; Jo Jun-hyung
- Editor: Kim Na-young
- Production companies: Ace Factory; SLL
- Budget: ₩14.46 billion

Original release
- Network: JTBC
- Release: June 8 – July 28, 2022

Insider (Korean: 인사이더) is a 2022 South Korean television series starring Kang Ha-neul, Lee Yoo-young, and Heo Sung-tae. It aired on JTBC from June 8 to July 28, 2022, every Wednesday and Thursday at 22:30 (KST) for 16 episodes.

== Synopsis ==
The series revolves around a judicial trainee whose life turns upside down when he goes on an undercover investigation, and ends up struggling to try to recover his normal life.

== Cast ==
=== Main ===
- Kang Ha-neul as Kim Yo-han, a judicial trainee who lives with his grandmother alone. He goes to jail for an undercover investigation at the suggestion of senior prosecutors.
- Lee Yoo-young as Oh Soo-yeon, a successful businesswoman who made a great fortune through her connections.
  - Um Chae-young as young Oh Soo-yeon
- Heo Sung-tae as Yoon Byung-wook, the chief prosecutor of the 2nd Division of Financial Tax Investigation at the Central District Prosecutors' Office.

=== Supporting ===
==== People around Kim Yo-han ====
- Kim Si-eun as Park Ro-sa, a police officer.
- Moon Sung-keun as Do Won-bong, the outcast king who once shook the political and financial world.
- Ye Soo-jung as Shin Dal-soo, Kim Yo-han's grandmother.

==== Prosecutors' Office ====
- Yoo Jae-myung as Noh Young-guk, director of the Judicial Research and Training Institute.
- Kim Sang-ho as Mok Jin-hyung, the chief prosecutor of Northern District Prosecutors' Office.
- Park Sung-geun as Hong Sang-wook, the chief of the investigation division at the Supreme Prosecutors' Office.
- Kang Shin-hyo as Hong Jae-sun, Hong Sang-wook's son and classmate of Kim Yo-han.

==== Seongju Prison ====
- Sung Ji-ru as Heo Sang-soo, director of Seongju Prison.
- Kang Young-seok as Jang Seon-oh, a gambling genius who took over the Seongju Prison.
- Choi Dae-hoon as Noh Seung-hwan
- Jo Hee-bong as Ryu Tae-hoon
- Choi Moo-sung as Song Doo-cheol
- Cha Yeop as Kim Gil-sang
- Han Jae-young as Jo Hae-do
- Yoon Byung-hee as Kim Woo-sang
- Han Gyu-won as Uhm Ik-soo

==== Seocho-dong Cartel ====
- Heo Dong-won as Yang Jun
- Jung Man-sik as Yang Hwa
- Kim Ji-na as Jin Su-min (Director Jin)

=== Extended ===
- Song Jae-hee as Kim Tae-soo, Kim Yo-han's father.
- Choi Ki-beom as a prisoner in the same cell as Kim Yo-han.
- Kim Min-seung as Woo Min-ho
- Jung Hwi-wook as Kwon Dae-il
- Lee Ki-chan as Woo Sang-gi
- Han Seong-su as Lee Tae-kwang
- Han Bo-reum as Annie Stephen
- Yoo Ha-bok as Kim Jeong-gyu
- Ha Ji-young as No Seung-hwan's wife
- Lee Ha-yool as Kim Woo-jae

=== Special appearances ===
- Jung Woong-in as a second generation chaebol
- Fan Bingbing as Lam, the representative of the Macau Triad.

== Production and release ==
It was reported that the first script reading of the cast was held on May 21, 2021.

The series was initially scheduled for release in the second half of 2021, but was pushed back to 2022.

== Original soundtrack ==
=== Part 1 ===
Released on June 23, 2022
No.	Title	Lyrics	Music	Artist	Length
1.	"Howling"	Han Kyung-soo	Han Kyung-soo; Jo Se-hee	Im Yoon-seong	3:22
2.	"Howling" (Inst.)		Han Kyung-soo; Jo Se-hee		3:23
Total length:					6:45

=== Part 2 ===
Released on July 13, 2022
No.	Title	Lyrics	Music	Artist	Length
1.	"You've Got Me Wrong"	Lee Chi-hoon; Choi Byul-bit; Snnny	Snnny	The Vane	3:27
2.	"You've Got Me Wrong" (Inst.)		Snnny		3:27
Total length:					6:53

== Viewership ==
Insider : South Korea viewers per episode (thousands)

Season	Episode number																Average
Season	1	2	3	4	5	6	7	8	9	10	11	12	13	14	15	16	Average
1	565	709	750	755	765	802	734	719	683	664	744	720	760	718	710	797	725

Source: Audience measurement performed nationwide by Nielsen Korea.

Average TV viewership ratings
Ep.	Original broadcast date	Average audience share (Nielsen Korea)	
Ep.	Original broadcast date	Nationwide	Seoul
1	June 8, 2022	2.568% (8th)	N/A
2	June 9, 2022	3.274% (5th)	3.413% (5th)
3	June 15, 2022	3.382% (2nd)	3.188% (4th)
4	June 16, 2022	3.306% (5th)	2.605% (9th)
5	June 22, 2022	3.184% (3rd)	3.032% (3rd)
6	June 23, 2022	3.414% (4th)	3.108% (5th)
7	June 29, 2022	3.087% (7th)	2.693% (8th)
8	June 30, 2022	3.104% (8th)	3.025% (7th)
9	July 6, 2022	2.756% (5th)	2.345% (7th)
10	July 7, 2022	2.928% (6th)	2.669% (7th)
11	July 13, 2022	2.947% (7th)	2.750% (6th)
12	July 14, 2022	3.139% (4th)	2.943% (4th)
13	July 20, 2022	2.781% (5th)	2.640% (4th)
14	July 21, 2022	2.609% (9th)	2.202% (9th)
15	July 27, 2022	2.944% (5th)	2.713% (3rd)
16	July 28, 2022	3.231% (5th)	2.662% (7th)
Average		3.041%	2.799% (Note: This average ratings is calculated based on the published ratings, the exact average ratings is unknown due to one ratings not published.)
In the table above, the blue numbers represent the lowest ratings and the red numbers represent the highest ratings.; N/A denotes rating that was not released.; This series aired on a cable channel/pay TV which normally has a relatively smaller audience compared to free-to-air TV/public broadcasters (KBS, SBS, MBC and EBS).

== Accolades ==
Name of the award ceremony, year presented, category, nominee(s) of the award, and the result of the nomination
Award ceremony	Year	Category	Nominee / Work	Result	Ref.
APAN Star Awards	2022	Best New Actor	Kang Young-seok	Nominated	
APAN Star Awards	2022	Best Supporting Actor	Heo Sung-tae	Won	
