= Ch'ang Chori =

Goguryeo politician (fl. 4th–5th centuries)

Prime Minister Ch'ang Chori Kuksang
- 창조리

Prime Minister of Goguryeo
- In office 294 BC – ?
- Preceded by: Sang-nu
- Succeeded by: Wang San-ak

- Ch'ang Chori
- Hangul: 창조리
- Hanja: 倉助利
- RR: Chang Jori
- MR: Ch'ang Chori

Ch'ang Chori (Korean: 창조리; Hanja: 倉助利; ?-?) was the prime minister of Goguryeo during the reigns of Kings Bongsang and Micheon.

== Background ==
Ch'ang Chori's origins or ancestry is not mentioned in historical records. It can be inferred that Prime Minister Ch'ang Chori came from a notable noble family because he served in high government positions such as Taesaja and Taejubu.

== Biography ==
=== Reign of King Bongsang ===
Ch'ang Chori is first mentioned to have served as Taesaja of the South Province, and later as Taejubu. He rose to the position of Prime Minister in the year 294, succeeding Prime Minister Sang-nu. In 296, Emperor You of the Xianbei Former Yan Kingdom, invaded Goguryeo. With this invasion, Ch'ang Chori urged the King to assign Taehyŏng general Ko Noja to the position of Castlelord of Shin Fortress. The Former Yan forces were defeated due to this assignment. When King Bongsang became corrupt and violent, Ch'ang Chori resigned from the position of Prime Minister and planned a coup to overthrow the tyrant and place Ko Ŭlbul, the King's nephew, on the throne. Ch'ang Chori staged the coup in the year 300, and overthrew King Bongsang, who committed suicide upon being banished.

=== Reign of King Micheon ===
Ch'ang Chori was reinstated to the position of prime minister under King Micheon. Samguk Sagi describes the benign rule of King Micheon, and his advisor Prime Minister Ch'ang Chori. The year of his death is unknown.

== See also ==
- Three Kingdoms of Korea
- Goguryeo
- Micheon of Goguryeo

== Sources ==
- Samguk Sagi, Goguryeo Bon-Gi

Preceded by Sang-nu	Prime Minister of Goguryeo; 294 –?	Succeeded by Wang San-ak
