= Reverse (2026 TV series) =

2026 South Korean television series

- Promotional poster
- Hangul: 리버스
- RR: Ribeoseu
- MR: Ribŏsŭ
- Genre: Mystery; Revenge; Thriller
- Based on: Reverse: Memory and Truth (Note: Reverse: Memory and Truth is a 2022 audio movie released on Naver Vibe.) by Lim Gun-joong
- Written by: Lim Gun-joong
- Directed by: Lim Gun-joong
- Starring: Seo Ji-hye; Go Soo; Kim Jae-kyung
- Country of origin: South Korea
- Original language: Korean
- No. of episodes: 8

Production
- Executive producer: Kim Hyo-jin
- Producers: Kim Young-mo; Jang Hyun-deok; Bae Sung-eun; Kim Sung-min; Kim Deok-jin; Ahn Byung-kyu
- Production companies: Outrun Brothers Pictures; Another Pictures; Naega Miraeda (NGM) Studios; Studios IN

Original release
- Network: Wavve
- Release: April 17 – May 8, 2026

Reverse is a 2026 South Korean mystery revenge thriller television series written and directed by Lim Gun-joong, and starring Seo Ji-hye, Go Soo, and Kim Jae-kyung. Based on the 2022 Naver Vibe audio movie Reverse: Memory and Truth by Lim, the series follows a woman who loses her memory in a mysterious villa explosion, as she uncovers a shocking conspiracy involving her fiancé and the powerful Seokwang Group. It was released on Wavve from April 17, to May 8, 2026, and also available for streaming on Viu.

== Synopsis ==
After surviving a devastating villa explosion that leaves her with no memory of her past, Myo-jin seeks to rebuild her life with the help of her fiancé, Jun-ho, the promising successor to Seokwang Group. However, their lives are upended when they begin to face the harrowing reality of the blast. The series follows their journey as a devoted romance transforms into a cold-blooded pursuit of revenge once the truth behind the explosion is revealed.

== Cast and characters ==
=== Main ===
- Seo Ji-hye as Myo-jin, a woman suffering from amnesia after being involved in a mysterious villa explosion
- Go Soo as Jun-ho, Myo-jin's husband and the successor to Seokwang Group
- Kim Jae-kyung as Hui-su, Myo-jin's friend and the owner of the villa where the incident occurred

=== Supporting ===
- Yoon Sun-ah as An Seung-hui, a gallery director who helps Jun-ho
- Lee Hyun-kyoung as Doctor Jeong, a psychiatrist who councels Myo-jin
- Shim Hyung-tak as Detective Woo, a police officer who investigates Myo-jin's case
- Im Won-hee
- Yoon Je-moon
- Choi Moo-sung
- Ku Sung-hwan as Jae-yong, owner of Haengbok Pub who becomes unexpectedly embroiled between Hae-gwang and Pil-joo
- Kim Min as Hae-gwang, a Korean Chinese fixer
- Kang Young-seok as Woo-shik
- Hwang Se-in
- Ryu Phillip
- Yoo Hyun-soo
- Kang Seong-ha
- Park Mi-hyun
- Cha Soon-bae
- Im Kang-sung
- Lee Jung-hyun as Pil-ju, Hae-gwang's right-hand man

== Production ==
=== Development ===
In February 2025, production company Outrun Brothers Pictures confirmed that the 2022 Naver Vibe audio movie Reverse: Memory and Truth would be adapted into an eight-episode television series. The project is a co-production between Outrun Brothers Pictures, Another Pictures, Naega Miraeda (NGM) Studios, and Studios IN. Director Lim Gun-joong, who wrote and directed the original audio movie, returned as both screenwriter and director for the adaptation. It received the highest evaluation score from the Korea Creative Content Agency (KOCCA) during the 2024 OTT Specialized Content Production Support project.

=== Casting ===
The lead cast was confirmed to include Seo Ji-hye, Go Soo, and Kim Jae-kyung. While the original audio movie featured voices by Lee Sun-bin and Lee Joon-hyuk, the drama version opted for a different lineup for its central characters. Actor Im Won-hee, who participated in the 2022 audio movie, was the only original cast member confirmed to join the OTT series. Other supporting cast include Yoon Je-moon, Shim Hyung-tak, Choi Moo-sung, Ku Sung-hwan, Kim Min, Kang Young-seok, Hwang Se-in, Lee Hyun-kyoung, Ryu Phillip, Yoo Hyun-soo, Kang Seong-ha, Park Mi-hyun, Cha Soon-bae, Im Kang-sung, and Lee Jung-hyun.

== Release ==
Originally scheduled for an August 2025 debut, Reverse was postponed to February 2026 before being finalized for an April 17, 2026, premiere. The series is set to be released as part of the "Monthly Wavve" programming lineup on Wavve. It is also available for streaming on Viu.
