= Kang Young-seok =

South Korean actor (born 1990)

Kang Young-suk
- 강영석
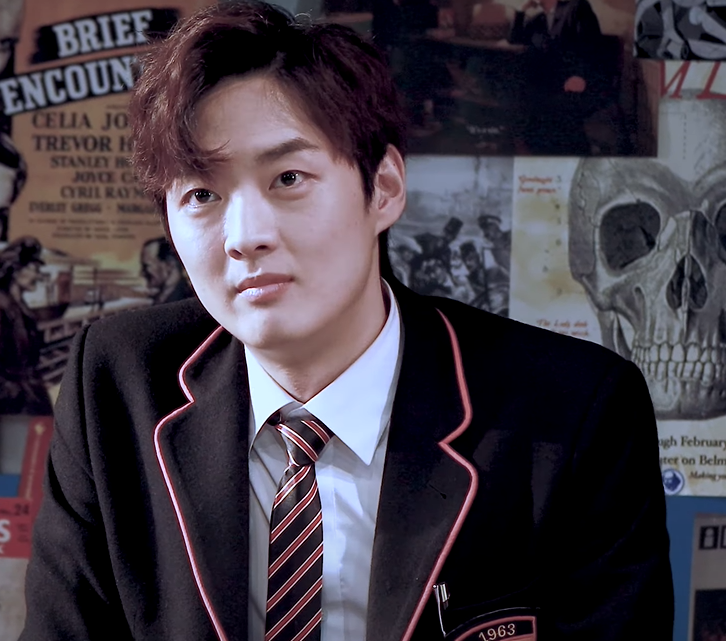
- Kang in 2019
- Born: August 12, 1991 (age 35); Seoul, South Korea
- Education: Chung-Ang University – Department of Theatre and Film
- Occupation: Actor
- Years active: 2011–present
- Agent: TH Company

Korean name
- Hangul: 강영석
- Hanja: 姜泳錫
- RR: Gang Yeongseok
- MR: Kang Yŏngsŏk
- Website: th-company.co.kr/actors/kang_youngsuk/

Kang Young-suk (Korean: 강영석; August 12, 1991), is a South Korean actor. In 2011, he made his debut as a musical actor in the production Hwarang. In 2014, he ventured into theater with his first play, titled B Adult Year. From 2017 onwards, he began by taking on minor roles and gradually worked his way up to more prominent supporting roles on television. He is known for his supporting roles in Should We Kiss First?, Revolutionary Love, 100 Days My Prince, Military Prosecutor Doberman, Insider, Mental Coach Jegal, Poong, the Joseon Psychiatrist, The Kidnapping Day, Welcome to Samdal-ri, and Queen Woo.

== Early life and education ==
During his time at Gaepo High School, Kang participated in sports but realized it wasn't his calling, leaving him unsure of his future path. It was during this period that he saw the musical Romeo and Juliet, igniting his curiosity about acting. Without hesitation, he enrolled in an acting academy and found it to be enjoyable. He devoted himself to his studies, often staying late to study scripts and even taking on cleaning duties. His hard work paid off, leading to his acceptance into the Department of Theatre and Film at Chungang University. He received support and faced no opposition from his parents as he pursued this path.

== Career ==
Kang Young-suk was initially disappointed when he couldn't find a suitable job, so he decided to explore audition opportunities. In 2011, he successfully landed a role in musical Hwarang after auditioning.

After being discharged from the military in 2014, Kang ventured into theater with his first play, titled B Adult Year. In the following year, he was recommended for auditions by friends for acting projects. While some may view his quick success in landing roles in the play Model Students (2015), the musical Bachelor's Vegetable Store (2015), and the musical Thrill Me (2015) one after another as luck, Kang attributes it to his diligent preparation and hard work in every audition. Kang's next role was Professor V, a genius physics professor who turns into a vampire in the musical Mama Don't Cry.

The play Old Wicked Song, which premiered in 2015, returned to the Dongsung Arts Center Dongsung Hall stage in September 2016. The story revolves around Mashkan, an eccentric professor with contrasting personalities, and Stephen, a pianist, who find solace and growth through music. The role of pianist Stephen was played by Kang and Lee Hyun-wook in double casting. Stephen, a talented pianist, struggles with inner turmoil and disconnects from the joy of music despite his skill.

This was followed by another musical, Black Mary Poppins. Set in Germany in the 1920s, it is a musical thriller that reveals the truth about four siblings involved in a fire and a mysterious murder that occurred in the mansion of renowned psychologist Dr. Gratzen, and the story of their missing nanny. Kang and Jeon Sung-woo played the role of Hermann, the second child, a painter with a masculine and free personality, but lonely and easily shaken. The musical was performed at Daehakro T.O.M Theater 1 starting on October 13, 2016.

In 2017, Kang was cast in the musical History of Fools in a triple casting as the main character, Seo Min-ki, alongside Park Si-hwan and Park Jeong-won.

The play Save the Earth, based on director Jang Jun-hwan's film of the same name, falls into the science fiction genre involving aliens. It is a psychological game between two characters: Byeong-gu, who has a deep wound in his heart, and Kang Man-sik, the person who inflicted the wound and holds the key to solving the problem. Kang, Park Young-soo, Jeong Wook-jin, and Key in the main role of Byeong-gu, took turns performing at Chungmu Arts Center's Black Theater from August 10 to October 22, 2017.

== Filmography ==
Key
†	Denotes films that have not yet been released

=== Film ===
Year	Title	Role	Notes	Ref.
2021	Waiting for Rain	Bookworm		
2022	The Test Takers	Student 5	Short film	
2022	When I Sleep	Plane passenger		
2022	President Jeong Yak-yong	Jang Hee-cheol		
2024	Cabriolet	Jeong Ki-seok		
2025	The First Ride	Kye Geum-bok		

=== Television series ===
Year	Title	Role	Ref.
2017	The Bride of Habaek		
2017	Revolutionary Love	Jang Cheol-min	
2018	Should We Kiss First?	Min Woo-sik	
2018	100 Days My Prince	Gwon Hyeok	
2020	When My Love Blooms	Kang Jun-woo	
2021	Undercover	Jeong Cheol-hoon	
2022	Military Prosecutor Doberman	Kang Ha-jun	
2022	Insider	Jang Seon-oh	
2022	Mental Coach Jegal	Go Young-to	
2023	Poong, the Joseon Psychiatrist	Jeon Kang-il	
2023	The Kidnapping Day	Jayden	
2023–2024	Welcome to Samdal-ri	Bu Sang-do	
2024	Queen Woo	Go Yeon-u / Sansang of Goguryeo	
2026	Reverse	Woo-shik	

== Stage ==
=== Musical ===
Musical play performance
Year	Title		Role	Theater	Date	Ref.
Year	English	Korean	Role	Theater	Date	Ref.
2011	Hwarang	화랑	Mu-rang-ro	SH Art Hall, Daehangno	August 20, 2011 - September 4, 2011	
2011	Hwarang	화랑	Mu-rang-ro	SH Art Hall, Daehangno	October 8, 2011 - October 23, 2011	
2015	The Bachelor's Vegetable Store	총각네 야채가게	Yoon Min	KEPCO Arts Center	November 13, 2015 - December 31, 2015	
2016	Thrill Me	쓰릴 미	Na	Yes 24 Stage 2	February 19 - June 12, 2016	
2016	Mama Don't Cry	마마 돈 크라이	Professor V	Uniplex 2	May 1 - August 28, 2016	
2016–2017	Black Mary Poppins	블랙메리포핀스	Hermann	Daehak-ro T.O.M. 1	October 14, 2016 - January 15, 2017	
2017	History of Fools	찌질의 역사	Seo Min-gi	Yes24 Stage 3	June 3 - August 27, 2017	
2018	The Man Who Had a Dream	홀연했던 사나이	Seungdol-i	Chungmu Art Center Middle Theater Black Box	February 6, 2018 - April 15, 2018	
2018–2019	Those Days	그날들	Sang-gu	Centum City Sohyang Theater Shinhan Card Hall Busan	Dec 23–30	
2018–2019	Those Days	그날들	Sang-gu	Daejeon Arts Center Art Hall	Jan 5–6	
2018–2019	Those Days	그날들	Sang-gu	Blue Square Shinhan Card Hall Busan	Feb 22–May 6	
2018–2019	Those Days	그날들	Sang-gu	Gyeongsangnam-do Culture and Arts Center Grand Performance Hall Guri	June 7–8	
2020	Charmy	차미	Oh Jin-hyuk	Chungmu Art Centre Middle Theatre Black	April 14 - July 5, 2020	
2020–2021	Amadeus	아마데우스	Wolfgang Amadeus Mozart	Gwanglim Art Centre BBCH Hall	November 17, 2020 - February 28, 2021	

=== Theater ===
Theater play performance
Year	Title		Role	Theater	Date	Ref.
Year	English	Korean	Role	Theater	Date	Ref.
2014	B Adult Year	B성년	Hallway	Hyehwa-dong Theater Experiment Room 1	July 3–13, 2014	
2015	Model Students	모범생들	Min-young/Myung-jun	Daehakno Free Theatre	May 8 – August 2	
2016	Old Wicked Songs	올드위키드송	Stephen	Dongsung Art Centre Dongsung Hall	September 24 - October 23, 2016	
2016–2017	Old Wicked Songs	올드위키드송	Stephen	Daehak-ro Dream Art Centre 1	November 8 - January 22	
2017	Model Students	모범생들	Myung-jun	Daehak-ro Dream Art Center 4	June 4, 2017 - August 27, 2017	
2017	Save the Earth	지구를 지켜라	Byeong-gu	Chungmu Art Center Middle Theater	August 10 - October 22, 2017	
2018	The Miracle of Namiya General Store	나미야 잡화점의 기적	Kohei	Yes24 Stage 1	August 21 to October 21	
2019	Another Country	어나더컨트리	Debbienish	Interpark Uniplex	May 21 - August 18, 2019	
2019	R&J	알 앤 제이	Student 2	Lee Hae-rang Theater	June 28 - September 29	
2019	The History Boys	히스토리보이즈	Daykin	Doosan Art Centre Yeongang Hall	September 20 - October 27, 2019	
2019	The Legend of Georgia McBride	조지아 맥브라이드의 전설	Casey	Uniplex 2nd Theater	November 27, 2019 – February 23, 2020	
2020	Another Country	어나더컨트리	Guy Bennett	Seogyeong University Performing Arts Centre SKON 1	June 10 - August 23, 2020	
2021	R&J	알 앤 제이	Student 2	Lee Hae-rang Theater	February 5, 2021 - May 2, 2021	

== Awards and nominations ==
Awards and nominations
Award ceremony	Year	Category	Nominee / Work	Result	Ref.
APAN Star Awards	2022	Best New Actor	Military Prosecutor Doberman; Insider	Nominated	
