= Sororate marriage =

Husband marrying the sister of his wife

Sororate marriage is a type of marriage in which a husband marries or engages in sexual relations with his wife's sister, usually after the death of his wife or if his wife has proven infertile. The fraternal equivalent is levirate marriage.

From an anthropological standpoint, this type of marriage strengthens the ties between both groups (the wife's family or clan and the husband's) and preserves the contract between the two to provide children and continue the alliance.

The Inuit (formerly known as Eskimos) of northern Alaska, Canada and Greenland follow or followed this custom. It is followed by the Chiricahua group of the Western Apache, who are Athabaskan speaking, as is levirate marriage.

Sororate marriage is practiced by the Sioux (Lakota) tribes, and some Western Mono tribes in California, such as the Wuksachi or Waksachi.

Sororate marriage is practiced by the Swazi people and for the same reasons as stated. This type of marriage is made in Bhutan. The former King Jigme Singye Wangchuck (the current king's father) is married to four wives, all of whom are sisters. There is evidence that sororate marriage existed in ancient China.

== Judaism ==
Levirate marriage was encouraged among ancient Jewish cultures; the chief example of sororate marriage found in the Hebrew Bible is that of sisters Rachel and Leah to one husband Jacob, the forebear of the Twelve Tribes of Israel. Such a marriage as Jacob's during the lifetime of the first wife was subsequently prohibited by the Law of Moses (Leviticus 18:18). However, upon the death of his wife, a man was considered free to marry his late wife's sister and, if the deceased left issue (children), it was considered especially meritorious for the widower to do so.

== Christianity ==
Christian views on sororate marriage have varied widely over time and between denominations. In the Catholic Church, the current canon law of the Latin Church permits a widower to marry the sister of his deceased wife. Together with consanguineous relatives, some Lutherans have prohibited marriage within close degrees of affinity, such as siblings-in-law, who are considered to fall within the prohibited degrees of kinship. The 1646 Westminster Confession prohibited marriages between siblings-in-law, stating that, "The man may not marry any of his wife's kindred nearer in blood than he may of his own, nor the woman of her husband's kindred nearer in blood than of her own." However, the clause forbidding the marriage of a deceased wife's sister or a deceased husband's brother was removed in 1887 from the revision of the Westminster Confession created by the Presbyterian Church in the United States. John Wesley, founder of Methodism, believed the Levitical law permitted marriage with a deceased wife's sister.

== Kurds ==
Sororate is a custom which is practiced among the Kurds like Levirate marriage: When a man loses his wife before she bears a child or she dies leaving young children, her lineage provides another wife to the man, usually a younger sister with a lowered bride-price. Both Levirate and Sororate are practiced to guarantee the well-being of children and ensure that any inheritance of land will stay within the family.

== See also ==
- Marriage with a deceased wife's sister
