= Queen Mother Buyeo =

Queen Mother Buyeo (Korean: 부여태후) was a queen mother regent of Korea.

She was the consort of prince Go Jaesa and the mother of king Taejodae of Goguryeo. She is called Buyeo because she was a Buyeo person, and her real name is unknown. Her son became king in 53 AD, when he was seven years old, and she ruled as regent for 7 years during his minority.
