= Henogamy =

Social custom allowing exactly one child in a family to marry

Henogamy is a social custom allowing exactly one of the children (or male children) in a family to marry.

Henogamy typically exists in order to preserve family property. It is practised by the Nambudiri Brahmin caste in the state of Tamil Nadu, India.
