= Wang San-ak =

Prime Minister Wang San-ak Kuksang
- 왕산악

Prime Minister of Goguryeo
- In office ?–?
- Preceded by: Ch'ang Chori
- Succeeded by: Yŏn Chayu

- Wang San-ak
- Hangul: 왕산악
- Hanja: 王山岳
- RR: Wang Sanak
- MR: Wang Sanak

Wang San-ak (Korean: 왕산악; Hanja: 王山岳, ?-?) was the prime minister of Goguryeo during the reign of King Yangwon (6th century AD).

According to the Samguk Sagi, written in 1145, the geomungo was invented by him by using the form of the ancient Chinese instrument guqin (also called chilhyeongeum, literally "seven-string zither"). After his death, the instrument was passed down to Ok Bogo, Son Myeong-deuk, Gwi Geum, An Jang, Cheong Jang, and Geuk Jong, while being widely spread over the kingdom.

== See also ==
- Three Kingdoms of Korea
- Goguryeo

== Sources ==
- Samguk Sagi, Vol 32, Goguryeo Bon-Gi

Preceded by Eventually Ch'ang Chori	Prime Minister of Goguryeo ?–?	Succeeded by Eventually Yŏn Chayu
