= Chadae of Goguryeo =

7th King of Goguryeo (r. 146–165)

Chadae 차대
- Taewang

King of Goguryeo
- Reign: 146 – 165 A.D.
- Coronation: 146 A.D.
- Predecessor: Taejodae
- Successor: Sindae
- Born: Go Suseong; 121 A.D.
- Died: 165 A.D.
- Burial: Maseongo
- Issue: Go Chuan
Posthumous name
- Chadae Taewang
- House: Go
- Dynasty: Goguryeo
- Father: Go Jaesa
- Occupation: King

- Chadae of Goguryeo
- Hangul: 고수성
- Hanja: 高遂成
- RR: Go Suseong
- MR: Ko Susŏng

Monarch name
- Hangul: 차대왕
- Hanja: 次大王
- RR: Chadaewang
- MR: Ch'adaewang

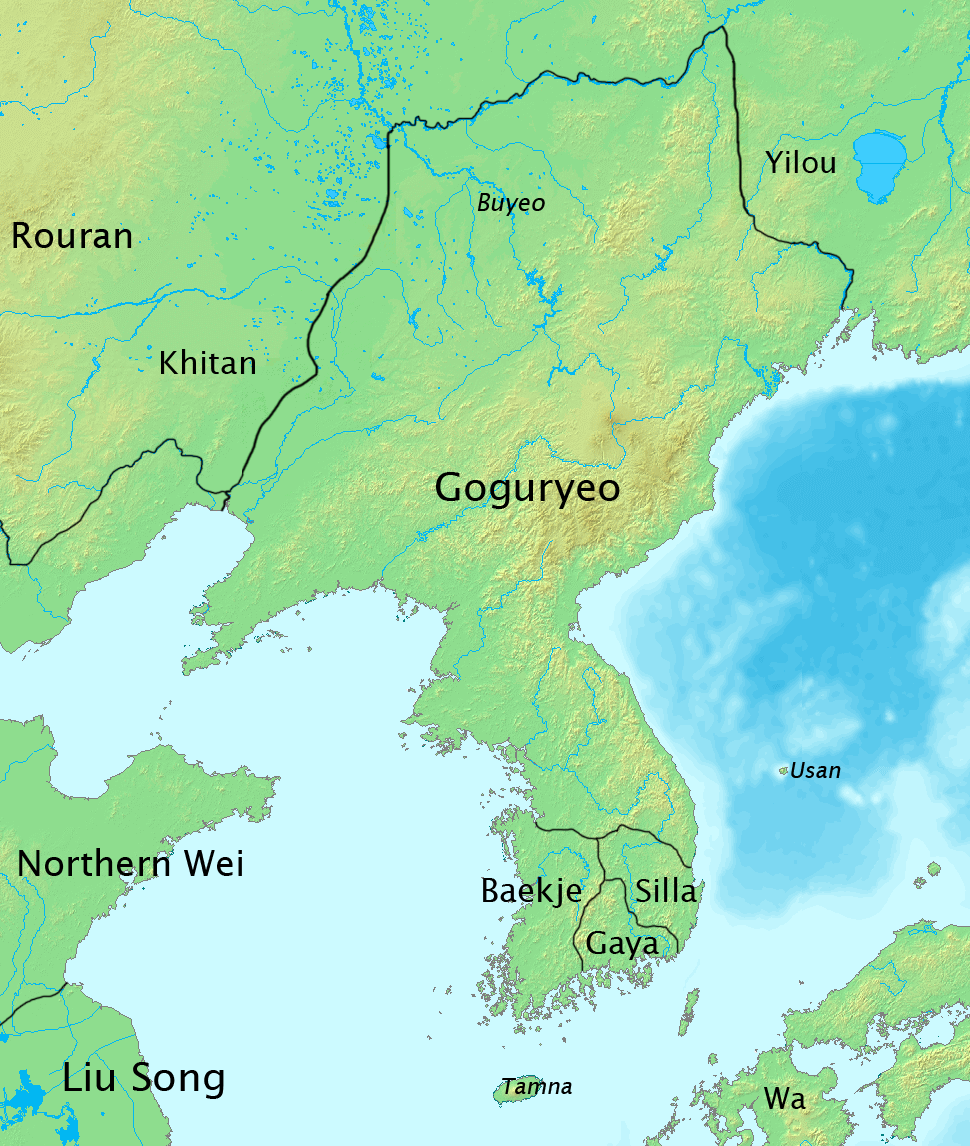
Map of Goguryeo

Chadae (71–165, r. 146–165) was the seventh king of Goguryeo, the northernmost of the Three Kingdoms of Korea. Although his wife is unknown, he had at least a son named Prince Chu'an (추안; 鄒安) who escaped from the palace after King Sin ascended the throne and then asked the king to spare his life and pardoned later.

== Background and rise to the throne ==
According to the Samguk sagi, he was the younger brother of the previous king Taejo the Great. He was said to be brave but cruel.

During his brother's reign, Chadae successfully repelled attacks by Han dynasty China, and gained power within the Goguryeo court. After eliminating opponents, including Go Bok-jang, he eventually received the throne from Taejo, who was probably forced to abdicate in 146.

== Reign ==
Chadae continued to consolidate power even after rising to the throne. In the third year of his reign, he ordered the deaths of Taejo's two sons, forced one of his brothers to commit suicide, and persecuted his youngest brother Baekgo (later King Sindae).

Following several natural disasters and civil unrest, he was killed by his minister Myeongnim Dap-bu, according to the Samguk sagi. According to the Samguk yusa, the subsequent king Sindae killed both Chaedae and Taejo.

== See also ==
- History of Korea
- Three Kingdoms of Korea
- List of Korean monarchs

Chadae of Goguryeo House of Go Born: 71 Died: 146
Regnal titles
Preceded by Taejodae	King of Goguryeo; 146–165	Succeeded by Sindae
