= Kyeru =

Ancient Korean city-state

- Hangul: 계루
- Hanja: 桂婁
- RR: Gyeru
- MR: Kyeru

Kyeru (Korean: 계루; Hanja: 桂婁) was an ancient Korean city-state that formed within the former realm of Gojoseon. Ruled by the Kyeru clan (계루부; 桂婁部), it later became a member of the confederation of Jolbon together with Sono, Jeolno, Sun-no, and Gwan-no, and was given to King Dongmyeong. A number of the members of the Go clan in the Kyeru lineage became kings of Goguyreo, including King Yuri and King Taejo, the second and sixth kings, respectively.

== See also ==
- Buyeo kingdom
- Jumong
- Goguryeo
