= Sindae of Goguryeo =

8th King of Goguryeo (r. 165–179)

Sindae 신대
- Taewang

King of Goguryeo
- Reign: 165 – 179 A.D.
- Coronation: 165 A.D.
- Predecessor: Chadae
- Successor: Gogukcheon
- Born: Go Baekgo; 89 A.D. Gungnae Seong
- Died: 179 A.D. (aged 90); Gungnae Seong
- Issue: Balgi; Nammu; Yeonu; Gyesu
Posthumous name
- Sindae Taewang
- House: Go
- Dynasty: Goguryeo
- Father: Go Jaesa
- Occupation: King

- Sindae of Goguryeo
- Hangul: 고백고; 백구
- Hanja: 高伯固; 伯句
- RR: Go Baekgo; Baekgu
- MR: Ko Paekko; Paekku

Monarch name
- Hangul: 신대왕
- Hanja: 新大王
- RR: Sindaewang
- MR: Sindaewang

King Sindae (Korean: 신대왕, 89–179; r. 165–179) was the eighth ruler of Goguryeo, the northernmost of the Three Kingdoms of Korea. The Samguk sagi records him as the half-brother of the sixth king Taejo and the seventh king Chadae. Other records indicate he may have been Taejo or Chaedae's son.

== Background ==
He remained quiet under the harsh reign of Chadae, secluding himself in the mountains. After Myeongnim Dap-bu assassinated Chadae, Sindae was invited to ascend the throne by court officials. At that time he was already 77 years old. The Samguk yusa indicates that Sindae himself killed Taejo and Chadae to become king. He tried to stabilize the court by incorporating Chadae's son and other opponents into his administration. To strengthen royal power, he created the supreme ministerial post of guksang(國相), and appointed Myeongnim Dap-bu to the office.

== Reign ==
In 169 and 172, Goguryeo was attacked by China, but successfully continued resistance to control the border. Goguryeo united with the Xianbei and attacked the Yuju and Byeongju districts of the Later Han dynasty of China; however, their alliance brought no great victory. The Later Han invaded Goguryeo in the eleventh month of 172, but were destroyed by Myeongnim Dap-bu's army at Jwawon(坐原), gaining success to expand its territory into western side of the kingdom.

== Death ==
In 176, he named his second son Nammu as the crown prince (subsequent king Gogukcheon), which consolidated the tradition of patrilineal succession. Sindae died in the twelfth lunar month of 179, at the age of 91.

== Family ==
- Unknown wife
  - 1st son: Prince Balgi (발기; 發岐); committed suicide after King Sansang ascended the throne.
  - 2nd son: Prince Nammu (남무; 男武)
  - 3rd son: Prince Yeonu (고연우; 高延優)
  - 4th son: Prince Gyesu (계수; 罽須); an active general during the reign of both king Gogukcheon and Sansang.

== In popular culture ==
- Portrayed by Bae Gi-beom in the 2024 TVING original series Queen Woo

== See also ==
- History of Korea
- Three Kingdoms of Korea
- List of Korean monarchs

Sindae of Goguryeo House of Go Born: 89 Died: 179
Regnal titles
Preceded by Chadae	King of Goguryeo; 165–179	Succeeded by Gogukcheon
