= Ŭl P'aso =

Goguryeo kuksang (Prime Minister) (died 203)

- Hangul: 을파소
- Hanja: 乙巴素
- RR: Eul Paso
- MR: Ŭl P'aso

Ŭl P'aso (Korean: 을파소; Hanja: 乙巴素; died 203) was the kuksang (Prime Minister) of Goguryeo under its 9th ruler King Gogukcheon.

Ŭl P'aso was a native of Chwa-mul village (좌물촌; 左勿村) near the West Amnok River Valley. He was the descendant of Ŭl So (을소; 乙素), a government minister under King Yuri (r.19 BC - AD 18), but by the time of King Gogukcheon he belonged to a farming family, probably in the sense of managing an estate rather than himself guiding the plough, since he was literate and had enough connections to have a "reputation" for wisdom. During the twelfth year of reign of King Gogukcheon (190), powerful aristocrats from the tribe of Yŏnna (연나부; 椽那部), who were relatives of the queen, seized land from the commoners. When the king attempted to punish them, they rose up in rebellion but were crushed by the royal army. The king asked the four tribes to select a man of wisdom to serve him. King Gogukcheon's sudden shift from an aristocratic to meritocratic style of government resulted in the discovering of many talented people throughout the kingdom. Among these selected individuals was An Ryu (안류; 晏留), who was a student and neighbor of Ŭl P'aso. An Ryu rejected the king's request but recommended Ŭl to the king, and Samguk sagi says that the king summoned Ŭl to the capital, and eventually gave him the position of Prime Minister in 191.

Ŭl P'aso helped the king rule the kingdom wisely, but was constantly attacked politically by jealous nobles, for it was precisely their power the King had brought him in to undermine. The king threatened them with extermination if they continued to disobey, and since he had begun his reforms by executing or banishing the followers of his maternal relatives for encroaching on royal power, they believed him and quieted down. Ŭl died in 203, during the reign of King Sansang, the successor of King Gogukcheon.

== See also ==
- Three Kingdoms of Korea
- Goguryeo

Preceded by Myeongnim Dap-bu	Prime Minister of Goguryeo; 191–203	Succeeded by Go Uru
