= Battle of Jwawon =

172 Conflict between Chinese Han and Korean Goguryeo forces

Date	172
Location	Jwawon, Manchuria
Result	Goguryeo victory (according to samguk sagi)

Belligerents
Goguryeo	Han

Commanders and leaders
Myeongnim Dap-bu	Geng Lin †

Strength
8,000–10,000	Around 10,000

The Battle of Jwawon (좌원전투; 坐原戰鬪) was a battle between the forces of the Han's Xuantu Commandery and Goguryeo. It resulted in a victory under the command of Myeongnim Dap-bu during the 26th year of the reign of King Sindae, the 8th ruler of Goguryeo.

== The coup d'etat of 165 ==
In 165, the news of the death of Goguryeo's 7th king spread throughout the land. The man responsible for the death of the king was Myeongnim Dap-bu, a Joui seonin and court official. Myeongnim Dap-Bu invited the dead ruler's youngest and only surviving brother, Prince Go Baek-gu, to the kingdom's capital to become the next ruler of Goguryeo.

The Prince became Goguryeo's 8th King Sindae, during that year. This coup was the first successful military revolt in Goguryeo's history. Myeongnim Dap-Bu was given the position of Guksang (국상, 國相, Prime Minister), and became the first Prime Minister of Goguryeo. Myeongnim Dap-Bu was never recorded to have abused his position, but strengthened the nation's strength economically, politically, and militarily. Meanwhile, the Han Empire assembled a large army and prepared to invade Goguryeo in the year 172.

== The Battle of Jwa-Won ==
In 169 AD, Xuantu governor Geng Lin invaded Goguryeo, killing hundreds. Goguryeo submitted to the rule of Liaodong Commandery.

According to Samguk Sagi, in 172 AD, Geng Lin led another military campaign against Goguryeo. In preparation for the invasion, Myeongnim Dap-Bu filled in the local wells, and made sure that the surrounding land could yield no food supply to the enemy forces. In addition, a moat was made, and many lines of defense were made outside of Goguryeo's capital, Guknae Fortress, at a place called Jwa-Won. The Goguryeo forces retreated into the fortress, and protected it upon the arrival of the enemy troops. After days of siege, the Han army was exhausted, and began to retreat. Myeongnim Dap-bu took advantage of the enemy's retreat and ambushed the Han army as they were beginning to retreat.

The 172 campaign, the battle of Jwa-Won, was not recorded in the Book of the Later Han or the Records of the Three Kingdoms, while the 169 campaign was documented. The battle of Jwa-Won only appears in Samguk Sagi. The Records of the Three Kingdoms only state that sometime around 175 AD, King Sindae asked to be governed by Xuantu Commandery.

== See also ==
- Han conquest of Gojoseon

== Sources ==
- Samguk Sagi
- Book of the Later Han
- Records of the Three Kingdoms
- 《三国史记》："八年 冬十一月 汉以大兵向我 王问群臣 战守孰便 众议曰 汉兵恃众轻我 若不出战 彼以我为怯 数来 且我国山险而路隘 此所谓 一夫当关 万夫莫当者 也 汉兵虽众 无如我何 请出师御之 答夫曰 不然 汉国大民众 今以强兵远斗 其锋不可当也 而又兵众者宜战 兵少者宜守 兵家之常也 今汉人千里转粮 不能持久 若我深沟高垒 淸野以待之 彼必不过旬月 饥困而归 我以劲卒薄之 可以得志 王然之 婴城固守 汉人攻之不克 士卒饥饿引还 答夫帅数千骑追之 战于坐原 汉军大败 匹马不反 王大悦 赐答夫坐原及质山 为食邑"
