= Myeongnim Dap-bu =

Prime minister of Goguryeo (died 179)

- Hangul: 명림답부
- Hanja: 明臨答夫
- RR: Myeongnim Dapbu
- MR: Myŏngnim Tappu

Myeongnim Dap-bu (67? – 179, Chinese: 明臨答夫; Korean: 명림답부) was the first Guksasang (국좌상 "Prime Minister") of Goguryeo, and was known for his overthrowing of the tyrannical King Chadae and his victory against Han China at the Battle of Jwawon.

== Rise to Power ==
Myeongnim Dap-bu was a Joui Seonin (조의 선인) of the Yeonna province of Goguryeo. He rose through the ranks during King Taejo's reign, and was in the courts by the time of Taejo's death. When Chadae rose to the throne in 146, Myeongnim Dap-bu faced many challenges and suffered under the tyrant's reign.

Finally, in 165, during the 20th year of King Chadae's reign, Myeongnim Dap-bu led an army and assassinated the king with the support of some of the nobles and court officials. Aged 99, Myeongnim Dap-bu took control of the Goguryeo government.

He invited Prince Go Baek-go, the younger brother of King Taejo, to become the next king. Go Baek-go was proclaimed the 8th King of Goguryeo during that year, and Myeongnim Dap-bu was given the position of Guksang (국상, 國相, Prime Minister), and became the first to receive the title in the history of Goguryeo. Myeongnim Dap-bu served faithfully under the new king, and defeated Han Chinese forces at the Battle of Jwawon.

== Death and Accomplishments ==
Myeongnim Dap-bu died in 179, aged 113 (112 by Western convention), after leading Goguryeo forces to victory against a tremendous Han army. Myeongnim Dap-bu served Goguryeo and brought about many benefits during the 60 years at which he was active in the kingdom's affairs. He assassinated a tyrant, strengthened royal power, defeated invaders, and finally, he led a fully successful revolution against a corrupt government.

== Controversial views ==
Historians have shared many different views on the figure of Myeongnim Dap-bu. Goguryeo's first Prime Minister possessed tremendous political power and influence, almost enough to be considered dictatorial. However, King Sindae was not a puppet ruler under influence of Myeongnim Dap-bu, like King Bojang was with Generalissimo Yŏn Kaesomun. No historical texts suggest that Myeongnim Dap-bu abused his power or was particularly cruel or violent. From this, many historians and scholars infer that Myeongnim Dap-bu was a true patriot and a forgotten hero.

== See also ==
- Goguryeo
- Chadae of Goguryeo
- Sindae of Goguryeo

== Sources ==
- Samguk Sagi, Goguryeo Bon-Gi, Sindae-gi

Preceded by none	Prime Minister of Goguryeo; 67 AD –179 AD	Succeeded by Ŭl P'a-so
