= Jungcheon of Goguryeo =

12th King of Goguryeo (r. 248–270)

- Hangul: 고연불
- Hanja: 高然弗
- RR: Go Yeonbul
- MR: Ko Yŏnbul

Monarch name
- Hangul: 중천왕, 중양왕
- Hanja: 中川王, 中壤王
- RR: Jungcheonwang, Jungyangwang
- MR: Chungch'ŏnwang, Chungyangwang

King Jungcheon (224–270, r. 248–270) was the 12th ruler of Goguryeo, the northernmost of the Three Kingdoms of Korea

== Family ==
- Father: King Dongcheon (동천왕; 東川王)
  - Grandfather: King Sansang (산상왕; 山上王)
- Consorts and their respective issue(s):
1. Queen, of the Yeon clan (왕후 연씨; 王后 椽氏); born in Yeonnabu (연나부; 椽那部).
  1. Unnamed son
  2. Prince Yakro (약로, 藥盧; d. 292)
  3. Prince Dalga, the Lord of An (안국군 달가, 安國君 達賈; d. 292) – had a virtue appearance that made him killed by the jealous King Bongsang.
  4. Prince Ilu (일우, 逸友; d. 286) – killed by King Seocheon.
  5. Prince Sobal (소발, 素勃; d. 286) – killed by King Seocheon.
  6. Unknown princess – married Myeongrim Holdo (명림홀도; 明臨笏覩) from Yeonnabu in 256.
2. Lady Gwanna (관나부인, 貫那夫人; d. 251); born in Gwannobu (관노부; 灌奴部) and said to have a beautiful face which made the king favoured her so much, but executed in around 251 – No issue.

== Background and rise to the throne ==
He was the son of King Dongcheon and was made heir to the throne in the 17th year of his father's reign. Upon his father's death in 248, Jungcheon followed him on the throne.

== Reign ==
=== Deaths within the royal family ===
In the 11th month of that year, Jungcheon's younger brothers Go Ye-mul, Go Sa-gu and others sought to betray him, but were caught and executed.

He married Lady Yeon, probably from the Yeonna-bu region. In 251, he came across a beautiful woman with nine-feet black hair from Gwanna region. Needless to say, two wives of Jungcheon argued severely at all times, trying to fend off each other out of king's eyesight. Eventually, Lady Gwanna was put to get drowned by angered king in the Yellow Sea. Although Lady Gwanng had one son with Jungcheon, he never got an opportunity to be a crown prince and in 255, Yak-ro, a son with Lady Yeon got the seat in 255, later Seocheon of Goguryeo.

=== War with the Wei ===
In 259 at the king's 12th year of reign, the Cao Wei general Yuchi Kai (尉遲楷) invaded with his army. The king sent 5,000 cavalry to fight them in the Yangmaek region; the Wei forces were defeated and about 8,000 people slain.

== Death ==
In 270, the king died at the age of 46, and was buried in Jungcheonji-won.

== See also ==
- History of Korea
- Three Kingdoms of Korea
- List of Korean monarchs

Jungcheon of Goguryeo House of Go Born: 224 Died: 270
Regnal titles
Preceded by Sansang	King of Goguryeo; 248–270	Succeeded by Seocheon
