= Gogukcheon of Goguryeo =

9th King of Goguryeo (r. 179–197)

Gogukcheon 고국천
- Taewang

King of Goguryeo
- Reign: December 179 – May 197 A.D.
- Coronation: December 176 A.D.
- Predecessor: Sindae
- Successor: Sansang

Crown Prince of Goguryeo
- Crown Prince: March 176 – December 179 A.D.
- Coronation: March 176 A.D.
- Predecessor: Go Aig
- Successor: Uwigo
- Born: Go Nammu; Before 176 A.D. Goguryeo Gungnae Seong
- Died: May 197 A.D. Goguryeo Gungnae Seong
- Burial: Gogukcheon Won
- Consort: Lady Wu
Posthumous name
- Gogukcheon Taewang; Gugyang Taewang
- House: Go
- Dynasty: Goguryeo
- Father: Sindae
- Occupation: King

- Gogukcheon of Goguryeo
- Hangul: 고남무
- Hanja: 高男武
- RR: Go Nammu
- MR: Ko Nammu

Monarch name
- Hangul: 고국천왕, 국양왕
- Hanja: 故國川王, 國壤王
- RR: Gogukcheonwang, Gugyangwang
- MR: Kogukch'ŏnwang, Kugyangwang

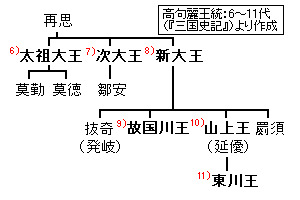
Genealogy of Goguryeo, 6th King ~ 11th King

King Gogukcheon (Korean: 고국천왕 died 197, r. 179–197) was the ninth monarch of Goguryeo, one of the Three Kingdoms of Korea. According to Samguk sagi, King Gogukcheon's height was recorded as 9 chi.

== Family ==
- Father: King Sindae (신대왕; 新大王)
- Consort: Queen, of the U clan (왕후 우씨; 王后 于氏); daughter of U So (우소; 于素) – No issue.

== Background and reign ==
Gogukcheon was the second son of Goguryeo's eighth king, Sindae. Though his older brother, Go Balgi (고발기), was originally the crown prince, the court officials supported Gogukcheon, who was made crown prince in 176.

However, this record is an error caused by Kim Busik's erroneous quotation of 《Tongdian》, who thought that I-imo was the same person as King Gogukcheon, and the established theory in the Korean history academia is that King Gogukcheon's older brother Gobalgi[拔奇] and King Sansang's older brother Gobalgi[發岐] are the same person. And it is believed in the Korean history academia that King Gogukcheon was not the second son of King Sindae, but the first son of King Sindae.

In 180, Gogukcheon married Lady U, the daughter of U So of the Jena-bu, further consolidating central power. Lady U remained queen after her husband's death due to her marriage with Gogukcheon's brother and subsequent king Sansang. During his reign, the names of five 'bu', or powerful regional clans, become names of districts of the central kingdom, and rebellions by the aristocracy were suppressed, notably in 191.

In 184, Gogukcheon sent his younger brother, Prince Gye-su to fight the Chinese Han dynasty invasion force of the governor of Liaodong. Though Prince Gye-Su was able to block the army, the king later directly led his armies to repel Han forces in 184. In 191, King Gogukcheon adopted a meritocratic system for selecting government officials. As a result, he discovered many talented people from all over Goguryeo, the greatest of them being Ŭl P'a-so, who was given the position of Prime Minister.

The ancient text Samguk sagi says that Gogukcheon went hunting one day in 194 and encountered a starving village. He gave some of his clothes and food to one of the villagers, and felt that the starvation of his people was his responsibility. Gogukcheon worked to improve the lives of farmers and peasants in his kingdom. Jindae law is a grain loan system enacted by Gogukcheon in 194. This system allowed people to borrow grain from March to July and pay back in October. This system was maintained by the age of Joseon dynasty as "Hwangok", which indicates the law was highly preserved more than a thousand years.

== Death and succession ==
Though Gogukcheon's ascension signaled a change from fraternal succession to father-son succession by primogeniture, he was succeeded by his brother Sansang. Gogukcheon's posthumous name was derived from his burial area, Gogukcheon-won (故國川原,고국천원).

== In popular culture ==
- Portrayed by Ji Chang-wook in the 2024 TVING original series Queen Woo.

== See also ==
- History of Korea
- Three Kingdoms of Korea
- List of Korean monarchs

Gogukcheon of Goguryeo House of Go Died: 197
Regnal titles
Preceded by Sindae	King of Goguryeo; 179–197	Succeeded by Sansang
