= Taejo of Goguryeo =

6th King of Goguryeo (r. 53–121/146)

King of Goguryeo
- Reign: 53 AD – debated over 146 or 121 AD
- Predecessor: King Mobon
- Successor: King Chadae
- Regent: Queen Mother Buyeo
- Born: Go Gung / Eosu; 47 AD
- Died: 165 AD (aged 118)
- Issue: Confirmed: Prince Makgeun (막근; 莫勤) Prince Makdeok (막덕; 莫德); Unconfirmed/disputed: Prince Suseong Prince Baekgo Prince Ingo
Regnal name
- King Gukjo (국조왕; 國祖王)
- House: House of Go
- Father: Go Jaesa
- Mother: Queen Mother Buyeo

Korean name
- Hangul: 고궁; 어수
- Hanja: 高宮; 於漱
- RR: Go Gung; Eosu
- MR: Ko Kung; Ŏsu

Monarch name
- Hangul: 태조왕; 국조왕
- Hanja: 太祖王; 國祖王
- RR: Taejowang; Gukjowang
- MR: T'aejowang; Kukchowang

King Taejo (claimed 47 – 165) was the sixth monarch of Goguryeo, the northernmost of the Three Kingdoms of Korea, from AD 53 to 146. Under his reign, the young state expanded its territory and developed into a centrally ruled kingdom. His 93-year reign is thought to be the third longest of any monarch in the world, although his claim was disputed.

== Background ==
Taejo's father was the youngest son of Goguryeo's second king, Yuri, Ko Chaesa (재사; 再思), the head of the Ko house of the Gyeru lineage, one of the five powerful houses of the royal court. His mother was from Buyeo (Queen Mother Buyeo).

Although the unpopular Mobon had named his son Ik as the crown prince, after Mobon's death in 53, the Goguryeo court nominated Chaesa to be the next king. Citing his advanced age, Chaesa declined and his seven-year-old son, Kung became King Taejo. His mother then acted as regent for the young king.

== Expansion and centralization ==
During the first year of his reign, he centralized the kingdom by turning the five clans into five provinces ruled by a governor from that clan, who were under the direct control of the king. He thereby firmly established royal control of the military, economy, and politics.

He conquered the states of Eastern Okjeo in 56, Galsa in 68, Jona in 72, and Juna in 74. He absorbed regional forces into the central bureaucracy, and traveled throughout his territories to strengthen royal control.

He fought on various occasions with China's Han dynasty and disrupted trade between Lelang and Han. In 55, he ordered the construction of a fortress in the Liaodong Commandery. He attacked Chinese border regions in 105, 111, and 118. In 122, Taejo allied with the Mahan confederacy of central Korea and the neighboring Yemaek tribe to attack Liaodong, greatly expanding the realm of Goguryeo. He launched another major attack in 146.

== Death ==
In the 94th year of his reign, Taejo's younger brother Suseong took the throne to become King Chadae. Although not found in the more orthodox Samguk sagi, the Samguk yusa says that Chadae soon killed both of Taejo's sons, and that the subsequent king Sindae, younger half-brother to Taejo and Chadae, killed both of his brothers in 165.

According to Samguk sagi and Samguk yusa, Taejo died aged 118, after ruling for 93 years. This claim, if taken at face value, would make him the longest living and reigning king in Korean history and also among the longest lived in world history.

According to the Chinese historical work Book of Later Han (in volume 85), Taejo died in the year 121, and his son Chadae stepped up. After Emperor An of Han decided not to initiate another battle with Goguryeo, Chadae settled peace with the Han dynasty in the following year. The imperial edict for this event was recorded as well. This date of death would involve a reign of 68 years—still one of the thirty longest reigning monarchs—and a lifespan of 74 years, in contrast to a nigh-supernatural 118-year longevity.

== Controversy surrounding rise to power ==
Jumong, the founder of Goguryeo, declared his surname to be Go. However, his son Yuri chose to use the surname Hae (해; 解). The three successors of Jumong and Yuri all utilized the surname Hae as well, instead of Go. After the last of these Hae rulers, a boy with the surname Go rose to the throne after deposing the last Hae ruler and his appointed successor. From viewing these historical facts, some scholars have come to the conclusion that the difference in surname was not a coincidence, but a clear indication that Jumong's immediate successors were not his descendants. The Hae rulers indicate the brief rule of the Sono-clan and the rise of King Taejo may indicate that the Go rulers of the Gyeru-clan regained power.

Another point of great interest among select scholars is the bestowing of the posthumous title of Taejo, which means "Grand Ancestor," on the sixth ruler of Goguryeo and not the first. Scholars have therefore stated that this fact is further proof that different families ruled early Goguryeo before the consolidation of power under King Taejo. These are highly controversial at present times among historians and scholars.

== See also ==
- History of Korea
- Three Kingdoms of Korea
- List of Korean monarchs

Taejo of Goguryeo House of Go Born: 47 Died: 146
Regnal titles
Preceded by Mobon	King of Goguryeo; 53–146	Succeeded by Chadae
