= Seocheon of Goguryeo =

13th King of Goguryeo (r. 270–292)

- Hangul: 고약로; 고약우
- Hanja: 高藥盧, 高若友
- RR: Go Yakro; Go Yaku
- MR: Ko Yangno; Ko Yagu

Monarch name
- Hangul: 서천왕; 서양왕
- Hanja: 西川王; 西壤王
- RR: Seocheonwang; Seoyangwang
- MR: Sŏch'ŏnwang; Sŏyangwang

King Seocheon of Goguryeo (died 292, r. 270–292) was the 13th ruler of Goguryeo, the northernmost of the Three Kingdoms of Korea. He was the second son of King Jungcheon, and was confirmed as Crown Prince in 255. He ascended the throne upon his father's death in 270. In the first lunar month of 271, he married Usu, the daughter of the daesaja of Seo-bu, to be his queen.

In 280, the Sushen people invaded and the king sent his younger brother Go Dal-ga to repel them. Dal-ga took the fortress, Dallo and killed its lord, and moved about 600 Sushen households to southern Buyeo. Subjugating 6 or 8 villages of Sushen, King Seocheon made Dal-ga the Prince of National Peace (Anguk-gun) and gave him control of the army, and of the Sushen and Yangmaek tribes. In 286, Seocheon's younger brothers Go Il-u and Go So-bal led an insurrection, but the rebellion failed and they were slain.

King Seocheon died in 292, after 23 years on the throne. He was buried at Seocheonwon, and accordingly received the temple name of "Seocheon." His mausoleum is considered to have been stolen around 296 when another nomadic people invaded Goguryeo in the reign of Bongsang.

== Family ==
- Father: King Jungcheon (중천왕; 中川王)
  - Grandfather: King Dongcheon (동천왕; 東川王)
- Mother: Queen, of the Yeon clan (왕후 연씨; 王后 椽氏)
- Wife: Queen, of the U clan (왕후 우씨; 王后 于氏); daughter of U Su (우수; 于漱) from Yeonnobu (연노부) who formally became the queen consort in spring in 271.
  - Son: Prince Sangbu (상부, 相夫; d. 300)
  - Son: Prince Dolgo (돌고, 咄固; d. 293) – accused for a treason and forced to commit suicide; father of King Micheon.

== See also ==
- History of Korea
- Three Kingdoms of Korea
- List of Korean monarchs

Seocheon of Goguryeo House of Go Died: 292
Regnal titles
| Preceded by Jungcheon | King of Goguryeo; 270–292 | Succeeded by Bongsang |
