= Bongsang of Goguryeo =

14th King of Goguryeo (r. 292–300)

- Hangul: 고상부; 삽시루
- Hanja: 高相夫; 歃矢婁
- RR: Go Sangbu; Sapsiru
- MR: Ko Sangbu; Sapsiru

Monarch name
- Hangul: 봉상왕; 치갈왕
- Hanja: 烽上王, 雉葛王
- RR: Bongsangwang; Chigarwang
- MR: Pongsangwang; Ch'igarwang

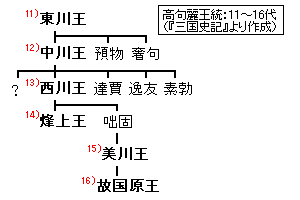
Genealogy of the 11th-16th Goguryeo kings

Bongsang (died 300, r. 292–300) was the 14th king of Goguryeo, the northernmost of the Three Kingdoms of Korea. He was the eldest son of King Seocheon.

From his youth, he is said to have been arrogant and dissolute, full of mistrust and envy. As soon as he was crowned, Bongsang charged his popular uncle Go Dal-ga (Prince An-guk) with treason and had him slain, upsetting his people.

In the eighth lunar month of 293 the Xianbei chieftain Murong Hui invaded. Bongsang fled to the mountain of Sinseong. The sohyeong of the north, Go No-ja, led five hundred cavalry out to meet the king, and went on to defeat the Xianbei forces. King Bongsang promoted Go No-ja to daehyeong, a position of the 5th rank, giving him Gongnim as stipend land.

The following month, the king feared that his younger brother Go Dol-go was plotting against him, and forced him to commit suicide. Dol-go's son, the subsequent king Micheon fled and preserved his own life. In the eighth month of 296, Murong Hui invaded once more, but was repelled.

The following month, a heavy frost and hail fell and destroyed the crops, but the king carried on with reconstructing the palace with gaining massive complaints from his people. In spite of continuous resentment, King didn't listen to the counsels of his ministers, while some of Goguryeo people chose to flee away from forced labor.

In the end, his ministers carried out a coup in the eighth lunar month of 300. Bongsang and his two sons committed suicide. He was buried in Bongsan-won. The ministers found the escaped prince, and set him on the throne as King Micheon.

== Family ==
- Father: King Seocheon (서천왕; 西川王)
  - Grandfather: King Jungcheon (중천왕; 中川王)
  - Grandmother: Queen, of the Yeon clan (왕후 연씨; 王后 椽氏)
- Mother: Queen, of the U clan (왕후 우씨; 王后 于氏)
  - Grandfather: U Su (우수; 于漱)
- Wife: Unknown queen
  - Both of their two sons were committed suicide by hanging himself with his father.

== See also ==
- History of Korea
- Three Kingdoms of Korea
- List of Korean monarchs

Bongsang of Goguryeo House of Go Died: 300
Regnal titles
Preceded by Seocheon	King of Goguryeo; 292–300	Succeeded by Micheon
