= Dongcheon of Goguryeo =

11th King of Goguryeo (r. 227–248)

Dongcheon 동천
- Taewang

King of Goguryeo
- Reign: May 227 – September 248 A.D.
- Predecessor: Sansang
- Successor: Jungcheon

Crown Prince of Goguryeo
- Reign: January 213 – May 227 A.D.
- Coronation: January 231 A.D.
- Predecessor: Nammu
- Successor: Yeonbul
- Born: Go Uwigeo/Wigung/Gyoche; September 209 A.D. Gungnae Seong
- Died: September 248 A.D. Gungnae Seong
- Burial: Siwon
- Issue: Yeonbul; Yemul; Sagu
Regnal name
- Dongyang Taewang
Posthumous name
- Dongcheon Taewang
- House: Go
- Dynasty: Goguryeo
- Father: Goguryeo
- Mother: Lady Sohu
- Occupation: King

- Dongcheon of Goguryeo
- Hangul: 우위거; 위궁
- Hanja: 憂位居; 位宮
- RR: Uwigeo; Wigung
- MR: Uwigŏ; Wigung

Monarch name
- Hangul: 동천왕; 동양왕
- Hanja: 東川王; 東壤王
- RR: Dongcheonwang; Dongyangwang
- MR: Tongch'ŏnwang; Tongyangwang

Childhood name
- Hangul: 교체
- Hanja: 郊彘
- RR: Gyoche
- MR: Kyoch'e

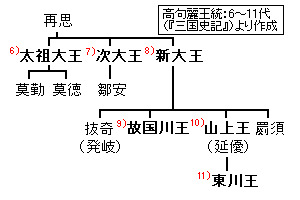
Genealogy of Goguryeo monarchs from 6th to 11th king

King Dongcheon (209–248, r. 227–248) was the 11th monarch of Goguryeo, the northernmost of the Three Kingdoms of Korea.

== Family ==
- Father: King Sansang (산상왕; 山上王)
  - Grandfather: King Sindae (신대왕; 新大王)
- Mother: Little Consort (소후; 小后)
- Consorts and their respective issue(s):
1. Unknown queen
  1. Prince Yeonbul (연불; 然弗)
  2. Prince Yemul (예물, 預物; d. 248)
  3. Prince Sagu (사구, 奢句; d. 248)
2. Unknown concubine; the people of the East Sea offer a beautiful woman to the king

== Background ==
He was the grandson of Goguryeo's eighth ruler, Sindae and the son of the tenth ruler, Sansang. His mother was King Sansang's royal concubine, from the Jutong-chon of Gwanno-bu. He was made crown prince in 213, and rose to the throne upon Sansang's death.

== Reign ==
In 238, Dongcheon was able to ally with the Wei, one of the three Chinese kingdoms in the northwestern area, in order to destroy the Gongsun family and erase its influence over Liaodong Peninsula and other areas bordering Goguryeo. The war on the Gongsun was a victory, but Goguryeo's ally, Wei, eventually became a new threat.

Goguryeo consolidated its power and began to threaten the Chinese commanderies, under the nominal control of Wei. In 242, Dongcheon attacked a Chinese fortress near the mouth of the Yalu River leading to the Goguryeo–Wei War; in 244, Wei invaded Goguryeo and sacked Hwando. Dongcheon was forced to flee the capital. After staying in Okjeo, his forces managed to return to the long-standing capital of Hwando, in which many structures were severely destroyed, only to move its capital to present-day Pyongyang in 246. The exact location of the new capital is still disputed.

According to the 12th century Korean historical text, Samguk sagi, a Goguryeo general named Yu Yu (유유; 紐由) approached the Wei encampment and fooled the Wei commanders into thinking that Goguryeo had come to surrender. Yu Yu took this chance to murder an officer and then committed suicide, causing great confusion and discord in the Wei army. King Dongcheon received news of Yu Yu's death and ordered that a memorial be made for Yu Yu the Patriot. Then, he led his armies in the attack to push the Wei forces out of Goguryeo territory. General Mil U (밀우; 密友) and Yu Okgu (유옥구; 劉屋句) also repulsed the Wei forces. The Goguryeo forces won this battle, and regained all of the territory that had been lost from defeats against the Wei. This passage was not paralleled in Chinese records, and Hiroshi Ikeuchi points out its errors: the author of this passage in Samguk sagi regarded the region of South Okjeo and Lelang as identical, while in fact they are on opposite sides of the peninsula; also, the references to the "Eastern Department" for Yu Yu and Mil U are anachronistic, since Goguryeo did not divide the country into departments until the middle of the Goguryeo dynasty — that is, after Dongcheon's reign. As such, Ikeuchi considered the Samguk sagi's stories to be fictional. KHJ Gardiner notes that the Samguk Sagi "seeks to reverse the reality of a defeat" in several instances, including an earlier conflict in 208 against forces led by Gongsun Kang in support of a claimant to the Goguryeo throne. According to the Samguk Sagi, the claimant supported by Kang was defeated by Gyesu, a younger brother of Sansang of Goguryeo. However Gardiner doubts both the existence of Gyesu as well as his victory.

According to Mark E. Byington, the extent of destruction caused to Goguryeo was such that Chinese historical texts did not mention it for the next 50 years. Gina L. Barnes states that the Chinese account of routing Goguryeo was the last piece of direct information from China on Goguryeo's development until the 6th century.

In 243, he named his son Yeonbul the crown prince and successor to the throne. He attacked Silla, another of the Three Kingdoms to its south, in 245 but made peace in 248. The records are found in Samguk sagi under the annal of Isageum (Silla's ruler) that Dongcheon invaded the northern area of Silla, but the validity of a peace agreement has not been fully explained, since given that Goguryeo was under harsh attacks from the northern area, an invasion of Goguryeo into Silla would be logically incomprehensible. It is well accepted that this invasion indicated a sudden inflow of refugees from Goguryeo into a bordering area with Silla.

== Death and succession ==
Dongcheon fell ill and died during the fall of 248 after 22 years of rule. His tomb is said to be in South Pyongan Province near Pyongyang, North Korea. He is said to have been so loved that many people followed him in death. Crown Prince Yeon-Bul succeeded his father as King Jungcheon immediately after his father's death.

== See also ==
- History of Korea
- Three Kingdoms of Korea
- List of Korean monarchs
- Goguryeo–Wei Wars

== Notes ==
Dongcheon of Goguryeo House of Go Born: 209 Died: 248
Regnal titles
Preceded by Sansang	King of Goguryeo; 227–248	Succeeded by Jungcheon
