= Sansang of Goguryeo =

10th King of Goguryeo (r. 196–227)

Sansang 산상
- Taewang

King of Goguryeo
- Reign: May 197 – May 227 A.D.
- Predecessor: Gogukcheon
- Successor: Dongcheon
- Born: Go Yeonu/Iimo; Unknown; Gungnae Seong
- Died: May 227 A.D. Gungnae Seong
- Burial: Sansang Neung
- Consort: Lady Wu
- Issue: Uwigo
Posthumous name
- Sansang Taewang
- House: Go
- Dynasty: Goguryeo
- Father: Sindae
- Occupation: King

- Sansang of Goguryeo
- Hangul: 고연우; 이이모
- Hanja: 高延優; 伊夷謨
- RR: Go Yeonu; Iimo
- MR: Ko Yŏnu; Iimo

Monarch name
- Hangul: 산상왕
- Hanja: 山上王
- RR: Sansangwang
- MR: Sansangwang

King Sansang (died 227, r. 196–227 ) was the 10th ruler of Goguryeo, the northernmost of the Three Kingdoms of Korea. He was the third son of the eighth king Sindae and the younger brother of the ninth king Gogukcheon, who died without an heir.

== Family ==
- Father: King Sindae (신대왕; 新大王)
- Consort and their respective issue(s):
1. Queen, of the U clan (왕후 우씨; 王后 于氏); daughter of U So (우소; 于素) – No issue.
2. A woman from Jutong village (주통촌)
  1. Prince Uwigeo (우위거; 憂位居)

== Background and rise to the throne ==
Upon Gogukcheon's death, his queen Lady U supported Sansang's claim and had him placed on the throne. She then became Sansang's queen. This indicates that the custom of Levirate marriage was still practiced in Goguryeo, but also demonstrated Lady U's power in court.

In 208, the Chinese warlord Gongsun Kang sent aid to Balgi, the older brother of Sansang, in support of his claim to the Goguryeo throne. Accounts differ on whether or not Balgi succeeded. The 12th century Samguk Sagi says he was defeated by Gyesu, younger brother of Sansang, whereas Chinese records say that the invasion won, conquering territory where Balgi was settled. KHJ Gardiner notes that the Samguk Sagi "seeks to reverse the reality of a defeat" in several instances and doubts both the existence of Gyesu as well as his victory.

Goguryeo was invaded by warlord Gongsun Kang in 204 after the older brother of the Goguryeo King Sansang of Goguryeo, Balgi, went to Gongsun Kang and requested 30,000 soldiers to invade Goguryeo so that Balgi could become king. Around this time, Kang established the Daifang Commandery by separating the southern half from the Lelang commandery. In 209, Kang invaded Goguryeo again seized some of its territory and weakened Goguryeo.

Pressure from Liaodong forced Goguryeo to move their capital in the Hun River valley to the Yalu River valley near Hwando. In 217, he granted refuge to a thousand families from the Liaodong region.

== Successor ==
In the eleventh lunar month of 208, the king chased a sacrificial boar to the village of Jutongchon, where he met a young woman and spent the day with her. The queen heard of this and sent royal forces, failing to kill her owing to her assertion that she conceived. The woman gave birth to a son and became a royal concubine. The son was made crown prince in 213 and later became King Dongcheon.

Sansang died during 227, the 31st year of his reign, and was buried in Sansang-neung.

== In popular culture ==
- Portrayed by Kang Young-seok in the 2024 TVING original series Queen Woo.

== See also ==
- History of Korea
- Three Kingdoms of Korea
- List of Korean monarchs
- Gongsun Kang

== Bibliography ==
- de Crespigny, Rafe (2007), A Biographical Dictionary of Later Han to the Three Kingdoms, Brill

Sansang of Goguryeo House of Go Died: 227
Regnal titles
Preceded by Gogukcheon	King of Goguryeo; 197–227	Succeeded by Dongcheon
