= Relations between Gaya and ancient Japan =

International relations

Yamato Japan and the Gaya Confederacy, which were located directly across the Korea Strait from one another, had very close diplomatic and commercial ties since prehistory until the conquest of Gaya by Silla in 562 AD.

Until recently Japanese historians had believed that Gaya, once called Mimana in Japanese, was controlled by Japan for most of its existence as an overseas colonial possession. Though this theory has been largely refuted since the 1970s, it remains a sensitive and re-occurring issue in modern-day Korea–Japan relations. In 2010, a joint study group of historians sponsored by the governments of Japan and South Korea agreed that Gaya had never been militarily colonized by ancient Japan.

== Gaya and Japan ==
Around 300 BC the introduction into Japan of agriculture and metallurgy from the regions of Korea which would later become Gaya helped bring a transition from the hunter-gatherer Jōmon culture into the Yayoi culture, though it is unclear whether this transition occurred due to a large-scale or small-scale invasion by a mainland Asian group or by the adoption of imports by the native inhabitants of the Japanese islands. As the nations of Yayoi Japan gradually unified, Gaya was the first foreign country with which they established relations and by the beginning of the Kofun period around 250 AD Gaya remained the country with which Japan had the closest links. Many Japanese archaeological sites dating from the Yayoi and the subsequent Kofun period testify to these contacts, with one holding artifacts that were 70% of Gayan origin.

=== Commerce and migration ===
A thriving bilateral trade existed between Gaya and Japan. Gaya exported pottery, horse tack, and most crucially, iron and iron products, to Japan, and among the items Japan sent back to Gaya were bronze implements and jade magatama produced at Itoigawa. For most of its existence Gaya enjoyed a monopoly on major trade routes both between Japan and China and between Japan and the rest of Korea, and was thus an important intermediary between Japan and other Asian countries.

Due to its proximity to China the Gaya Confederacy was also politically and technologically ahead of Japan and played an important role in Japan's development as a nation. Mass migrations of Gayans to Japan, often to escape strife between Gaya and neighboring Korean states, allowed Japan to produce on its own some of the products it had previously needed to import. Japan's sue pottery style and its first iron production were founded by Gayan immigrants, and Gayan warriors and officials were widely employed by the Japanese government.

=== Military alliance ===
In 399 AD Japan formed a military alliance with Gaya and Baekje in opposition to the growing power of Goguryeo and Silla and from then on the Japanese often dispatched military forces to protect Gaya's territorial integrity, possibly in exchange for iron or other goods. The defeat of one such Japanese expedition to Gaya is described on the Gwanggaeto Stele constructed in 414 AD. Japanese mercenaries were also allowed to serve in Korea, and the characteristically Japanese keyhole-shaped burial mounds which started to appear in Gaya and Paekche at the end of the 5th century are believed to be the tombs of those who died in Korea. While the unity of the Gaya Confederacy was falling apart under pressure from neighboring states, one of the Gayan states, Ara Gaya, even formed a joint military mission with Japan in 540 AD which was staffed by Japanese officers.

In 554 AD Japanese soldiers fought alongside the armies of Gaya and Paekche at the Battle of Kwansan Fortress. The defeat of this alliance by Silla sealed the fate of Gaya which was conquered by Silla in 562 AD. By this time Paekche had already broken Gaya's monopoly on trade with Japan and would replace Gaya as Japan's most important conduit for foreign trade and mainland Asian culture.

== "Mimana" historical debate ==
The Nihon Shoki, an ancient text of Japanese history, states that Empress Jingū led a military expedition on the Korean peninsula which defeated the forces of Gaya, Paekche, and Silla, and made Gaya, which was referred to as Mimana, into a colony under the control of a Japanese administrative office called "Mimana Nihon Fu". By the calculation of Japanese historians, it was said that this event took place in either 249 AD or 369 AD, and that Japan's domination of Mimana lasted until 562 AD. Though scholars had doubts about some aspects of this story, it was accepted as historical fact in both Japan and in Western countries that Japan had indeed possessed a colony called Mimana on the Korea peninsula between these dates. This theory was particularly popular in Japan prior to and during Japan's occupation of Korea from 1910 to 1945 and was used as a justification for it. However, the theory continued to be supported well after 1945, including in the works of such influential Western Japanologists as George Sansom, John Whitney Hall, and Edwin Reischauer.

Apart from the Nihon Shoki, evidence which was cited at the time to prove Japan's conquest of Gaya/Mimana included the exhuming of contemporary Japanese weaponry and armor from archeological sites in Korea, the inscription on the Gwanggaeto Stele which indicates that Japanese forces were occupying Gaya, and the titles received by Japanese monarchs from China's Liu Song dynasty acknowledging Japan's control over southern Korea. Today however, Japanese artifacts in Korea are seen as evidence of Japanese armies and mercenaries dispatched at the request of Gaya and Paekche, the inscription on the Gwanggaeto Stele is regarded as an exaggeration to justify Kokuryo's attacks, and the titles granted by China are considered to be most likely purely symbolic. Historians have also called into question the historical reliability of the Nihon Shoki's account of events, as Japan was far behind Gaya technologically and still politically fractious at the time when Empress Jingu was alleged to have successfully invaded Korea.

In 1963 North Korean historian Kim Sŏk-hyŏng became the first scholar to call into question the existence of a Japanese colony in ancient South Korea. He instead put forward the so-called "branch kingdom theory", stating that "Mimana" was not in Korea at all but was a settlement of Gayan immigrants on the Japanese mainland in modern-day Okayama Prefecture which was eventually absorbed into Yamato Japan. Though Kim's theory is today not widely accepted outside of North Korea, it did spur other historians to pursue further research in this field. Hideo Inoue, the first Japanese historian to propose an alternative to the Japanese colonial theory, argued in a 1972 book that Mimana was actually a small self-governing settlement of Japanese immigrants living in Korea, though this idea is likewise not widely supported among academics.

The theory which is today dominant among both Korean and Japanese historians is the "diplomatic delegation theory", originally put forward by Masayuki Ukeda in 1974, which proposes that "Mimana Nihon Fu" as described in the Nihon Shoki was actually a sort of Japanese embassy handling diplomatic relations between the independent states of Gaya and Japan.

Rurarz describes five main theories about Mimana, the first of which was proposed by Suematsu. A second theory about Mimana was proposed by North Korean scholar Gim Seokhyeong, who suggested that Mimana was a political entity from the Korean Peninsula (possibly Gaya) who had a colony on the Japanese islands, somewhere around the modern-day city of Ōyama, Ōita in Ōita Prefecture; thus Nihongi should be understood as referring only to the Japanese islands and Jingū's conquest a description of a migration to a land in the Japanese Archipelago, not the Korean Peninsula. This is related to the so-called horserider invasion theory in which horse riders from the Korean Peninsula are hypothesized to have successfully invaded Japan, and in so doing introduced horses, not native to the islands, to Japan. A third theory has been proposed by Japanese scholar Inoue Hideo, who argued that ancient Japanese Wa people might have settled a region in the Korean peninsula as long ago as around the Neolithic, and the Mimana state was an enclave of this group. A fourth theory was put forward by South Korean scholar Cheon Gwan-u, who argued that the events present a history of the Korean Baekje state, which was allied with Yamato Japan, and whose leaders fled there after Baekje's fall in the 7th century. In this version, Mimana would refer to Baekje, or some poorly understood fragment of that state, that fought against Gaya. The fifth theory, which Rurarz describes as a "compromise version of recent young Japanese and Korean scholars" argues that there never was a Mimana state as such, and the term refers to Japanese diplomatic envoys active in the Korean peninsula in that era.

According to Han Yong-u, Yamato Japan could have established an office in Gaya in order to export iron to Japan; this theory suggests that Mimana was a diplomatic embassy, and Jingū's conquest would be a dramatization of efforts undertaken to establish that embassy.

In 2010, a joint study group of historians sponsored by the governments of Japan and South Korea agreed that Gaya had never been military colonized by ancient Japan, but Japanese were active in the 6th century, a declaration deemed by the newspaper Chosun Ilbo to be a turning point in relations between the two countries.

=== The "Mimana" controversy as an international issue ===
Scholar Mark Peterson has stated, "Today nothing offends the Korean sense of nationalism and resurrects the images of the brutal Japanese takeover more than to hear of one of its former kingdoms referred to by the Japanese name, Mimana – it has become one of the symbols of Japanese abuses in Korea over the centuries."

Still, the debate among historians on the status of Mimana did not become a source of tension between Korea and its neighbors until the Japanese textbook controversy of 1982 which catapulted the way the Japanese viewed their history into the international spotlight. The crisis was sparked by allegations that Japan's Ministry of Education had been changing the word used in grade school history textbooks to describe Japan's overseas conquests from "invasion" to the more innocuous "advance". However, the controversy expanded to other issues, including the fact that the textbooks still discussed ancient Japan's conquest and rule of Mimana. The South Korea government formally protested the books, condemning their descriptions of Mimana as "distorted and offensive" and eventually Japan agreed to check the books for errors within two years time.

Since then the issue of Mimana has been a reoccurring issue in Korea's international relations. Bill Gates recalled in 1997 that the release of the Korean edition of Microsoft Encarta which mentioned Japan's domination of Mimana was greeted with mass outrage in South Korea with one major newspaper calling for a boycott of Microsoft products.

Another major eruption of the controversy occurred in April 2001 when the Japanese government approved for use in schools a history textbook written by the Japanese Society for History Textbook Reform which endorsed the theory of Japan's colonial occupation of Mimana. South Korea issued a strongly worded protest the following month which was rebuffed by Japan on the grounds that complaints about textbooks had to be issued during the approval process rather than after it. Though the textbook was not widely adopted by schools, when it came up for re-certification one year later the Japanese government requested that references to Japan's "base of operations" in Mimana be deleted "in view of scholarly opinions at this time concerning historic relations between Japan and Korea".

Shortly thereafter, during the controversy over the Northeast Project of the Chinese Academy of Social Sciences, the South Korean government also reacted angrily to the government of China which had posted a summary of Korean history on the Foreign Ministry's website which implied that ancient Japan had controlled the southern Korean Peninsula. China responded by deleting its entire description of Korean history prior to 1945.
