= Haman County =

Coordinates: 35°14′N 128°20′E

Haman
- County
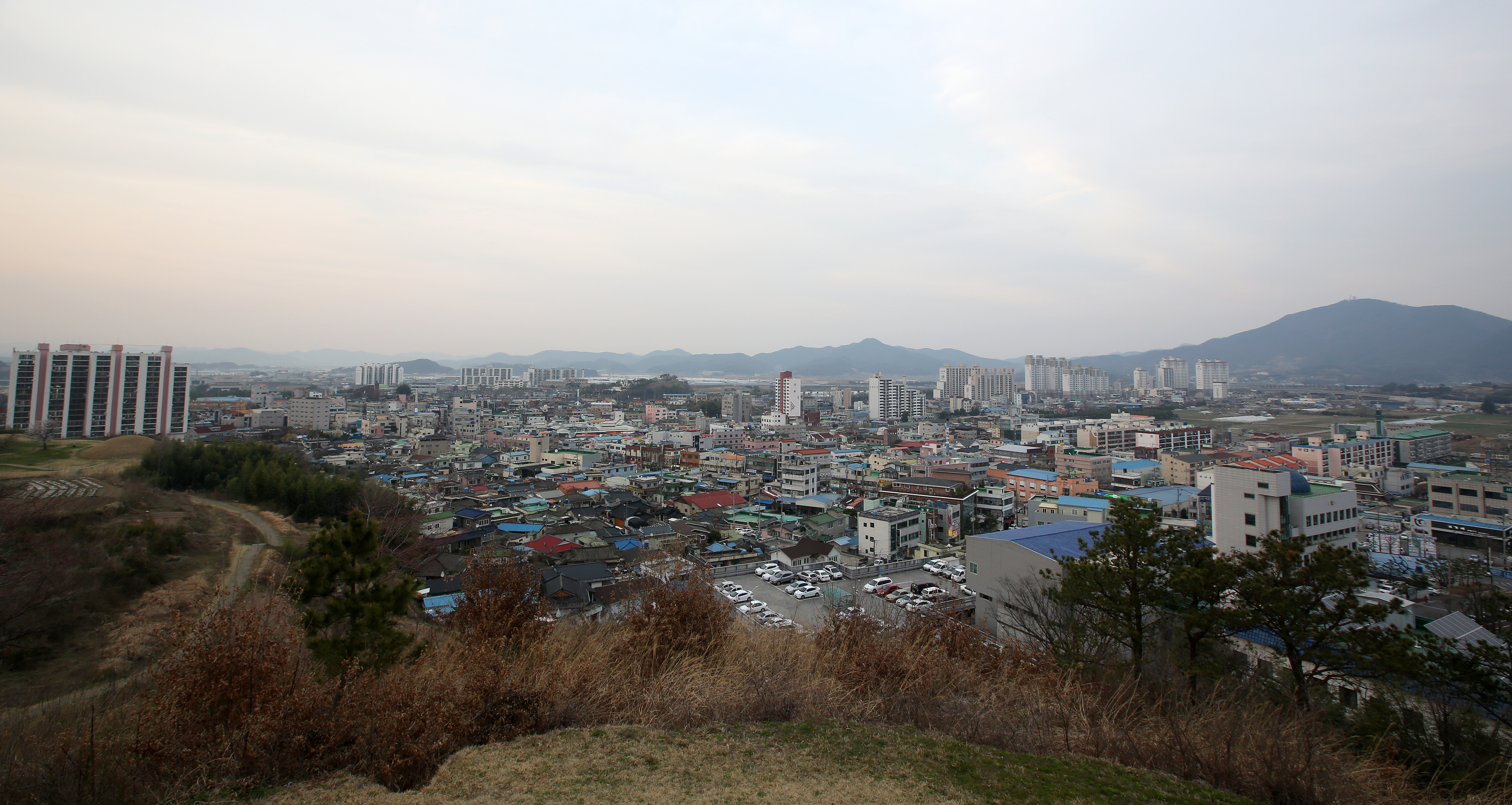

- Flag Emblem of Haman

- Location in South Korea
- Country: South Korea
- Region: Yeongnam
- Administrative divisions: 2 eup, 8 myeon

Area
  - Total: 417 km^{2} (161 sq mi)

Population (September 2024)
  - Total: 59,102
  - Density: 152.1/km^{2} (394/sq mi)
  - Dialect: Gyeongsang

Korean name
- Hangul: 함안군
- Hanja: 咸安郡
- RR: Haman-gun
- MR: Haman-gun

Haman County (Korean: 함안군) is a county in South Gyeongsang Province, South Korea. The local government is seated in the town of Gaya-eup. The county magistrate is Seok Gyu-jin.

In the early Common Era, Haman was the seat of Ara Gaya, a leading state of the Gaya confederacy. Many relics from this period are still preserved in the county. After the fall of Gaya, Haman was absorbed into Silla as Asirang County; in 757, it was renamed to its present moniker Haman.

It borders Changwon to the east and south, Changyeong County to the north and Uiryeong County to the west. It comprises 3.9% of South Gyeongsang Province. Haman stretches 29 km from east to west and 26 km from north to south. It is located roughly in the center of the province. The county is fairly mountainous with Gaya-eup being in the river valley. The highest peak in Haman is Mount Yeohang (770m). There are many tributaries of the Nakdong and Nam rivers in Haman. The Nam serves as the county line between Uiryeong and Haman and the Nakdong as the county line between Haman and Changyeong.

== Transportation ==
It is convenient in location being that the Namhae Expressway (Interchange 10) goes through the middle of it. It takes roughly 25 minutes from Haman Intercity Bus Terminal to Masan Intercity Bus Terminal in Hapseong-dong. Buses leave every 30–40 minutes. Uiryeong-gun can also be easily reach by bus from Haman Bus Terminal. However, other surrounding locations are hard to reach by bus from Haman. There are also two train stations that lie within Haman-gun (Gaya-eup and Gunbuk-myeon) making it possible to reach locations such as Suncheon, Jung-ri, Masan, Changwon and Busan by train. However, train schedules in Haman are sporadic making it more convenient to take a bus to Masan and travel onward from there. There are also a number of bike paths throughout Gaya-eup and downward into Haman-myeon. In other areas of the county, bike paths are lacking.

== Economics and Industry ==
Haman-gun is an agrarian county. It is particularly famous for the watermelon. There is a watermelon festival held every year in Hamju Park, Gaya-eup in April. It is grown and produced throughout the county in the tributaries of the Nakdong and Namgang rivers. The output per year is 48,217 tons. Some other agricultural products that are grown in Haman are the persimmon, melons, cherry tomatoes, peaches, lotus root, gold melons and grapes. There are a number of factories in Haman-gun with the heaviest concentration being in Chriwon-myeon and Chirseo-myeon.

There is also a market day held every five days in Gaya-eup in the Gaya Market. When the market is open, the farmers from all over the county come to the market to display their fresh produce. There are also many different kinds of vendor that sell meat, fish, snacks and clothes.

== Tourism ==
Haman-gun is not known for its tourism industry and visitors from other countries are rare, but the county does have historical sites, temples and mountains to explore. For example, Haman-gun has good places to hike led by Mount Yeohang (770m) in the village of Jueseo-ri in the township of Yeohang-myeon at Yeohangsan Provincial Park in Yeohangsan on secondary Rural Road 1021, which branches off Highway 79. There are four hiking courses originating at different points. Two other peaks are on Mount Bangeo in Gunbuk-myeon and Mount Jakdae in Chriwon-myeon, Ungok-ri.

The Ancient Tomb Complex in Dohang-ri and Malsan-ri in Gaya-eup is another site worth seeing in Haman. It contains around 1,000 tombs in mound form that are supposedly the tombs of kings. The largest royal tomb is Tomb 34 at 39.3m in diameter and 9.7m in height. There is also a museum that accompanies the park. The exhibits are in Korean so admission is free for foreign visitors.

Ipgok County Park in Sanin-myeon, Ipgok-ri is also a particular area of interest in Haman. It can be reached by taking bus 252-2 and 114-1 from any bus stop in Gaya going towards Jung-ri and Masan. It is 4 km from the town center. It is the biggest reservoir in Haman with a circumference of 4 km. There are a number hiking paths and it is frequently visited by local families and fishermen on the weekends. There are also some multiple purpose grounds for soccer and volleyball. It is a nice place to visit in spring to see the azaleas and in the fall to see the changing leaves. Hamju Park in Gaya-eup, Dohang-ri is another place the locals visit for leisure. There is also a stadium there and sports facilities.

== Cultural Events ==
There are two festivals in Haman. The first being the Araje Festival which is held on the weekend that April 15 falls. There are a number of cultural and sports events that commemorate the Ara Gaya.

There is also the Watermelon Festival which is also held on a weekend April at Hamju Park in Dohang-ri, Gaya-eup. There are a number of entertainment events, concerts and fireworks. There is also a display of carved watermelons which is quite interesting to see.

== Education ==
Educational facilities: 32 schools (elementary 19/middle 8 /high 5), covering 7,830 students. Some of the elementary schools have less than 30 students.

== Administrative divisions ==
Haman is divided into 8 myeon and 2 eup, as follows:

- Gaya-eup
- Beopsu-myeon
- Chirbuk-myeon
- Chilseo-myeon
- Chirwon-eup
- Daesan-myeon
- Gunbuk-myeon
- Haman-myeon
- Sanin-myeon
- Yeohang-myeon

== Twin towns – sister cities ==
Haman is twinned with:

- Dobong-gu, Seoul, South Korea
- Gangseo-gu, Seoul, South Korea
- Jangseong, South Jeolla, South Korea
- Liaoyang, Liaoyang, Liaoning, China

== See also ==
- Geography of South Korea
