= Silla–Goguryeo and Paekche–Kaya–Wa War =

4th to 5th century war in Korea

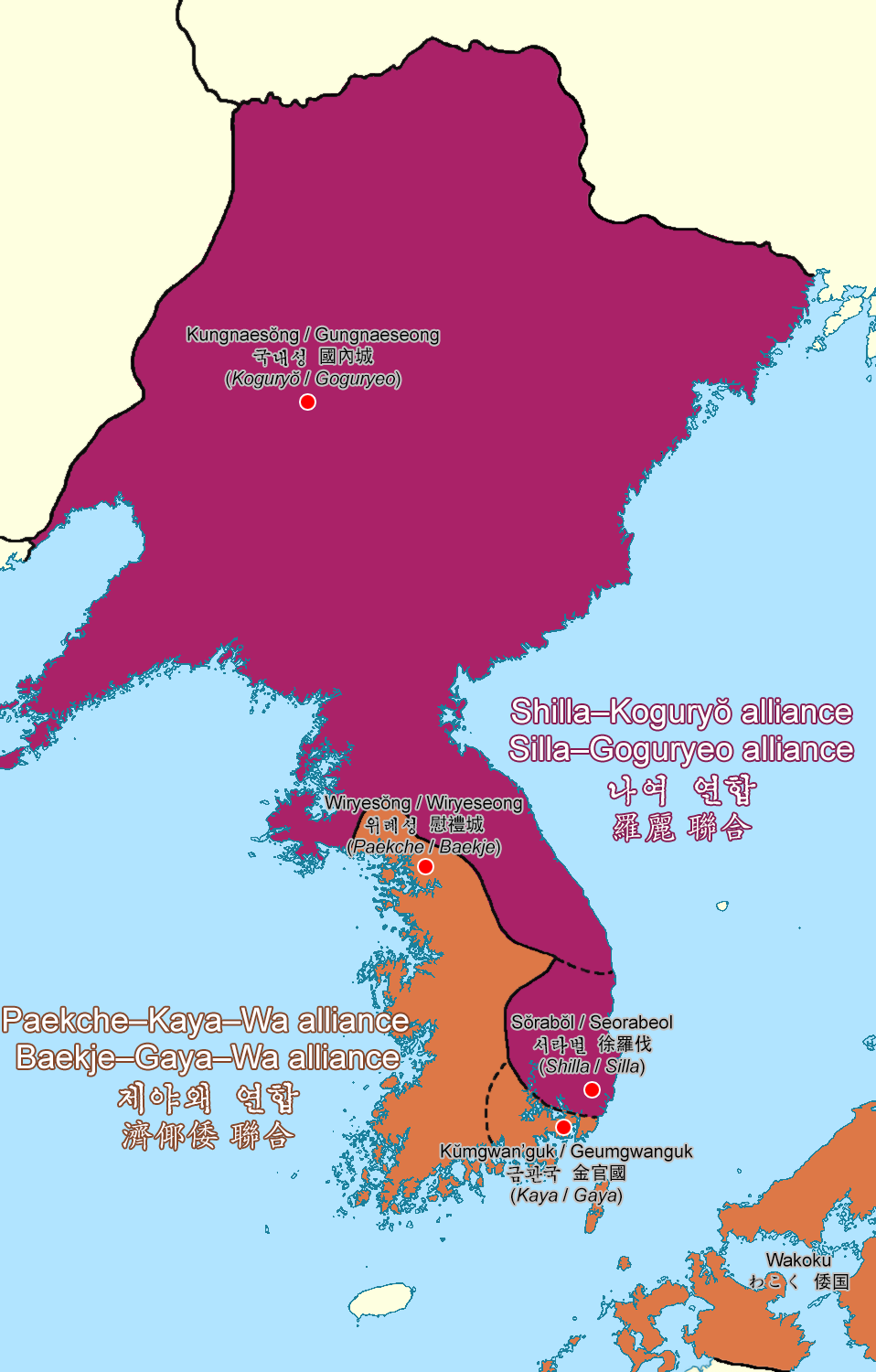
- The Silla–Goguryeo and Paekche–Kaya–Wa alliances. Mid 4th century to early 5th century.
Date	364–404 or 407
Location	Korean peninsula
Result	Silla and Goguryeo victory
Territorial changes	Goguryeo successfully helps Silla remove the Paekche–Kaya–Wa forces from its territory while strengthening its ties with the kingdom.

Belligerents
Silla; Goguryeo	Paekche; Kaya; Wa

Commanders and leaders
Naemul (Silla); Gwanggaeto the Great (Goguryeo)	Asin (Paekche); Isipum? (Kaya; unverifiable); Empress Jingū/Emperor Nintoku/Emperor Richū? (Wa; disputed; unverifiable)

The Silla–Goguryeo and Paekche–Kaya–Wa War (Korean: 나여–제야왜 전쟁; Hanja: 羅麗・濟倻倭 戰爭; RR: Nayeo–Jeyawae Jeonjaeng; MR: Nayŏ–Cheyawae Chŏnjaeng) was a series of conflicts that spanned for 40 years from the mid 4th century to the early 5th century between the Silla–Goguryeo alliance and the Paekche–Kaya–Wa alliance according to the Samguk sagi, Samguk yusa, Nihon Shoki, and inscriptions found in the Gwanggaeto Stele.

It was the first and only time where all four nations of Korea (Goguryeo–Silla–Paekche–Kaya) were involved in a single war, and Wa (Japan)'s first international conflict prior to the introduction of the Yamato Kingship and the following Battle of Baekgang that came after.

== Background ==
=== History ===
During the Three Kingdoms period, Korea was divided into three kingdoms (Goguryeo, Paekche, Silla) and one confederacy of smaller kingdoms (Kaya).

Goguryeo, a kingdom that was built by Prince Chumong (King Dongmyeong) of Buyeo alongside the native Koreans in the ruins of Old Chosŏn, expanded its territories southward, overthrowing and absorbing the Four Commanderies of Han that were established after the Han dynasty invaded and destroyed Old Chosŏn. The kingdom reclaimed most of the lost lands from the Han by the early 4th century and successfully repelled incoming invasions from the Chinese dynasties.

Paekche was a kingdom that arose from an earlier confederacy (Mahan confederacy) that was part of the Samhan period of Korea. It is said that King Dongmyeong's second son, Onjo moved to Mahan and united the people there to create a new kingdom. Paekche became a powerful naval kingdom that had good diplomatic ties with Japan.

Kaya was a confederacy that succeeded its former polity known as the Byeonhan confederacy, it was the only region in Korea that did not become a single nation, but remained as a key trading hub for kingdoms in East Asia. The confederacy was composed of smaller kingdoms, but was unilaterally managed under the leadership of Geumgwan Gaya.

Silla was built under the leadership of Hyeokgeose who united the old kingdoms of the Jinhan confederacy into one. It was considered relatively small and had rivalries with its neighboring kingdoms such as Paekche. It mostly depended on bigger kingdoms such as Goguryeo in its earlier years, and later the Tang dynasty. However, the kingdom quickly resisted its allies once they were deemed unprofitable (i.e. Silla–Tang War), and ultimately became the first kingdom to unify the peninsula in Korean history.

Outside of Korea, Japan (known as Wakoku) became heavily invested in Korean affairs due to trade and cultural dependence. Prior to the establishment of the Yamato Kingship, Wakoku (as well as the Korean kingdoms) was considered as a "primitive" or "barbaric" nation by the Chinese (see Dongyi), hence being given the characters "Wa (倭)" which meant "dwarf" or "small", and "Koku (國)" which meant "nation". Korean kingdoms did not share the same sentiment as the Chinese, instead deeming Wakoku as a valuable trading partner as well as a culturally compatible nation. Many new technologies were passed over to Japan through Toraijins from the kingdoms and provided Japan with cultural enlightenment such as Confucianism, Buddhism, Chinese characters (Kanbun/Kanji), medicine, lunar calendar, and cultural practices such as Sue ware production and weaving. Wakoku also understood the importance of the Korean kingdoms at the time, thus forming alliances with them and providing military support in exchange for their knowledge.

=== Premise of the war ===
During the late 4th century, friction between the kingdom of Silla and the confederacy of Kaya was beginning to emerge since the fall of the Lelang Commandery caused by Goguryeo. Prior to this, the two kingdoms' predecessors: Byeonhan and Jinhan, were known to show a strong sense of rivalry despite being recorded as "culturally and ethnically almost identical" by Chinese historians. This sentiment is believed to have been carried over even after the two confederacies evolved into newer polities.

The confederacy, known for its production of iron, often traded with the neighboring Korean kingdoms, as well as the Chinese Lelang Commandery and the Japanese Wakoku or "Wa". However, after the fall of the commandery by Goguryeo forces, Kaya lost an important trading partner. Silla, which was considered as the least influential kingdom at the time, was able to create an alliance with Goguryeo which opened up a new gateway for trade routes that expanded into the bigger continental regions rather than being confined within the peninsula. Sensing the threat and having pre-existing rivalry with Silla, Kaya in turn allied with Paekche and Wa of Japan, and attacked Silla for dominance over the region of southern Korea.

== Kaya–Silla War ==
The two factions tried to maintain an amicable relationship at first, with many of the Kaya royals marrying into the Silla aristocracy as it is stated in historical accounts that the two nations' customs and people were greatly similar. However, the two nations did not remain on good terms with the first war occurring during the reigns of King Suro of Kaya and King Talhae of Silla; in the year of 76, Suro attacked Silla which lasted an entire year where in 77, Silla was able to kill one thousand soldiers of Kaya and become victorious. Another war broke out in 94, where Kaya was able to take control over Maduseong (마두성), a fort established by Silla, and had several more skirmishes happening in the years of 102, 115, and another in 254. With more tensions arising due to political unrest and economic diversion, Kaya began to align itself more with the kingdom of Paekche and later Wa of Japan by the early 4th century. Paekche, a kingdom that already had a good relationship with Wa, begun militarily aiding Kaya in destroying Silla as Paekche also deemed the kingdom as a growing threat.

Silla, on the other hand, began to search for an ally in the region due to many of its neighbors already forming one. With no other choice, Silla decided to request an alliance with Goguryeo by declaring it as the "superior" kingdom. With two clear alliances being made in the Korean peninsula, cooperation began almost immediately with Kaya supporting invasion campaigns made by the Wa on Silla, providing them with provisions and military personnel. This caused Kaya and Silla to get involved in conflicts constantly, with allies from their respective alliances sending reinforcements. This ongoing Kaya–Silla battles allowed Wa to continue attacking Silla under Kaya's supervision.

== Silla–Wa War ==
Under the pressure of trying to maintain close allies within the Korean peninsula, Wa sent military aid to Kaya and Paekche. However, due to geographical proximity, Wa forces often fought skirmishes with Silla troops, resulting in full scale battles in the mid-late 4th century. In April of 364, it states that Wa led a massive attack on the kingdom of Silla, closing in on the capital of Seorabeol. Despite the uneven odds, it is said that King Naemul successfully repelled the incoming Wa forces with only a thousand troops by using a clever tactic.

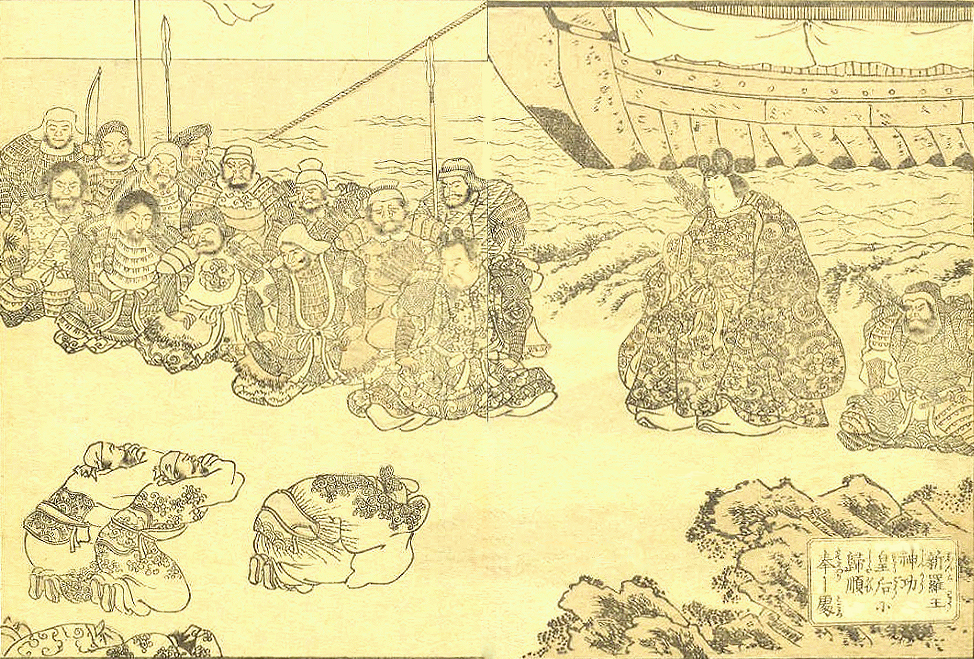
A depiction of an unknown Silla king and his ministers surrendering to Empress Jingū, drawn by Utagawa Kuniyoshi in 1860.

Japanese historians posit that this was in fact the Invasion of the Three Koreas (三韓征伐; Sankan Seibatsu); also known as the Invasion of Silla (新羅征伐; Shiragi Seibatsu) of Japan, led by Empress Jingū and her Grand Minister (Ōomi), Takenouchi no Sukune. According to the Nihon Shoki, Empress Jingū, who was the wife of Emperor Chūai and mother to Emperor Ōjin, was given a message from the heavens, instructing her to hastily invade Silla (Korea) stating that it was her "promised land". She allegedly returned to Japan victorious after three years.

However, due to the empress's inconsistent age and the nature of the Nihon Shoki being very generous to supposed accomplishments made by Japan, the theory is often scrutinized. Modern historians claim that "the message" the empress received was an invented reasoning for her to attack Silla in order to reclaim her supposed "promised land", and a good excuse to execute the invasion as Empress Jingū was a Silla royalty herself (through Amenohiboko, a prince of Silla) according to the Kojiki.

Similarly, the book claimed that Jingū's expedition helped her conquer a region in southern Korea in the 3rd century AD naming it "Mimana", a name that is read as "Imna" in Korea that is synonymous with Kaya. With Kaya being the center stage of the Silla–Goguryeo and Paekche–Kaya–Wa War, it can be deduced that the Nihon Shoki used the war as a reasoning for embellishing the claim that Japan successfully subjugated a Korean kingdom. This sentiment was in fact carried out by historians such as Suematsu Yasukazu who in 1949, proposed that Mimana (Kaya) was a Japanese colony on the Korean peninsula that existed from the 3rd to the 6th century. However, the claim is heavily criticized in modern times where in 2010, a joint study group of historians sponsored by the governments of Japan and South Korea agreed that Kaya (Mimana/Imna) had never been militarily colonized by ancient Japan.

Historically, it is said that Emperor Nintoku (Emperor Ōjin's son and Empress Jingū's grandson) was the reigning Tennō during the Silla–Wa War which likely passed on to his son, Emperor Richū's reign. However, similar to Empress Jingū's story, these claims are also found within the Nihon Shoki, therefore, historians remain skeptical.

== Goguryeo–Paekche War ==
Under the leadership of King Asin of Paekche, many battles were ensued from Paekche to Goguryeo to weaken the kingdom's military prowess. Since his ascension to the throne in November of 392, Asin faced many losses in his fight against Goguryeo during his reign. One of his biggest failures was in August of 393, where 10,000 Paekche troops had to retreat due to shortage of provisions, and another in July of 394, where he singlehandedly lost a battle against Goguryeo's 5,000 cavalries.

After receiving multiple provocations from Paekche, Gwanggaeto of Goguryeo ultimately led an army in 396 to counterattack Paekche. In the progress, he destroyed 58 villages out of 700 and arrived very close to Wiryeseong, the capital of Paekche. With no other choice, Asin sent 1,000 young men and women alongside 1,000 layers of silk, and declared to be "a forever inferior to the king of Goguryeo". As a result, Goguryeo forces retreated back to their kingdom, but while taking Asin's brother and 10 of his personal ministers back to Gungnae (capital of Goguryeo) as hostages.

Feeling humiliated, Asin organized another attack on Goguryeo. In May of 397, he broke the treaty forbidding Paekche from interacting with Wa of Japan by sending his son, Jeonji as a political hostage. Later, he began the construction of castle exteriors alongside reforming his political systems. Finally in August of 398, he dispatched another invasion to Goguryeo, but was called off very soon after a big meteorite hit his camp, believing it to be an ominous sign.

Later, due to political unrest and constant defeats, Asin decided to halt any invasions to Goguryeo, rather focusing on maintaining a good relationship with his people (who were also exhausted from the constant battles) and his ally nations. This allowed Paekche, Kaya and Wa to devise a plan to ultimately invade and subjugate Silla.

== Goguryeo–Wa War ==
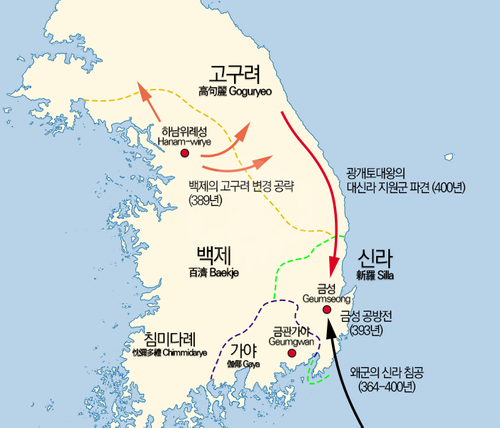
Travel routes of the Goguryeo–Wa War, one of the most significant battles that dictated the results of the long lasted war.

Also known as the Gwanggaeto's Rescue of Silla (광개토대왕의 신라 구원) in Korea, the Goguryeo–Wa War is one of the major battles that ultimately turned the tides for the bigger Silla–Goguryeo and Paekche–Kaya–Wa conflict.

In 400, recuperated forces of Paekche and its joint allied forces of Kaya and Wa invaded the kingdom of Silla where the army of Wa arrived the earliest. Sensing the looming danger, King Naemul of Silla sent a messenger to Gwanggaeto urgently requesting for aid as his "inferior" and "citizen", stating that the "forces of Wa have already crossed the border". Inspired by Naemul's bravery, Gwanggaeto replied with a military tactic then quickly amassed his soldiers and began his rescue mission of Silla.

According to the Gwanggaeto Stele, it is said that Gwanggaeto dispatched 50,000 soldiers to the capital of Silla. By the time Gwanggaeto and his Goguryeo forces arrived, the armies of Kaya and Paekche had already rendezvoused with the Wa forces. Upon seeing Goguryeo's arrival, Silla quickly joined its forces with the Goguryeo reinforcement and the five armies had a standoff. According to the stele, the collective number of the Goguryeo–Silla forces pushed the Wa–Kaya–Paekche armies out of the capital; having nowhere to go, the invading three armies retreated to Kaya, but were quickly pursued by Goguryeo–Silla troops into a castle in Alla (Ara Gaya; sometimes interpreted as Geumgwan Gaya) where they ultimately surrendered.

== Aftermath ==
A few more skirmishes happened after the Goguryeo–Wa War, however, the outcomes did not change and in 404, the alliance of Goruyeo and Silla became victorious.

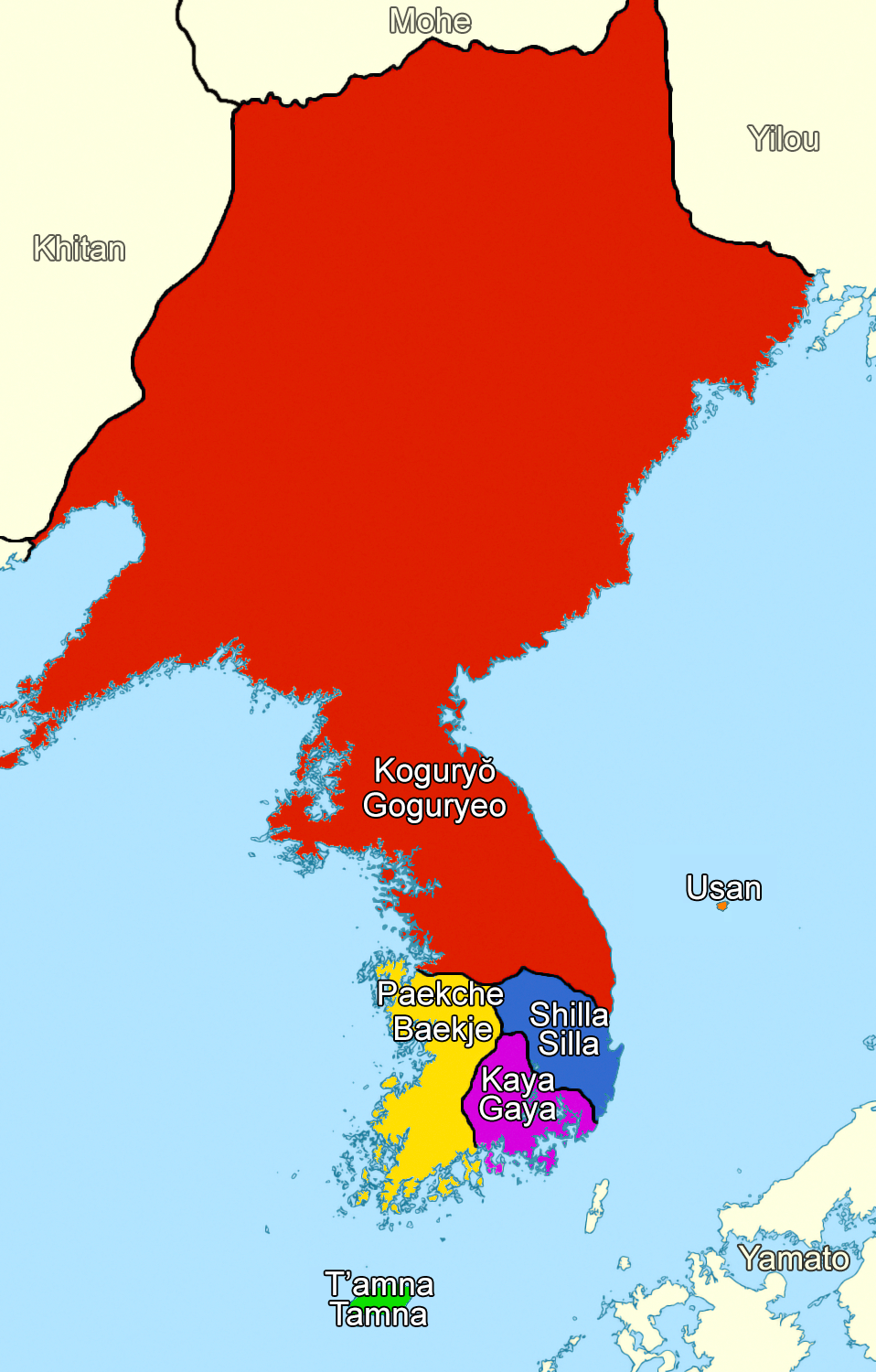
The Three Kingdoms of Korea (Goguryeo, Paekche, Silla) and Kaya confederacy. Mid-late 5th century.

The defeat of the invading armies marked the end of the 40 years war which resulted in Goguryeo making both Silla and Paekche its subjects, bringing about a short-lived alliance of the Three Kingdoms of Korea that lasted about 50 years. Goguryeo remained a super power, while Paekche and Wa lost influence in the regions.

King Asin of Paekche died a year later in 405 prompting his son Jeonji, who was in Japan as a political hostage at the time, to return to his home kingdom to become his successor. Jeonji, now king of Paekche, was known to have frequently attacked Goguryeo to avenge his father during his reign. However, Paekche's battle against Goguryeo did not end with Goguryeo, under King Jangsu, successfully invaded and conquered Paekche's once ancient capital of Wiryeseong by assassinating its king, Gaero of Baekje. Gaero's son, Munju of Baekje, had to move the capital from Wiryeseong to Komanaru in 475 right after ascending to the throne.

Kaya, specifically Geumgwan Gaya, did not recover from the loss. Geumgwan Gaya's leadership dwindled and was eventually succeeded to Daegaya, another city-state of Kaya in the 5th century. Daegaya allied with Paekche and Silla to attack Goguryeo, but failed. Similar to Geumgwan Gaya, due to multiple losses, the leadership of Daegaya was transferred over to Ara Gaya in the 6th century. However, despite the constant transfer of leadership, Kaya eventually capitulated to Silla in 532 AD where its royal houses was accepted into the Silla aristocracy.

Silla, though becoming a tributary state to Goguryeo, became the second most dominant kingdom within the peninsula after Goguryeo. They gained much land from Paekche and Kaya, and even absorbed the entire region of the latter when it later capitulated. However, the alliance/tributary relations with Goguryeo did not last, as Silla later allied with the Tang dynasty in order to defeat the remaining two kingdoms: Paekche and Goguryeo (Battle of Baekgang). After their defeat, Silla quickly removed the Tang, their once ally, from the peninsula (Silla–Tang War) ultimately becoming the only remaining nation in the region.

In Japan, anti-Silla sentiment began to grow after the war with many of the narratives that surrounded Silla being revised to paint a negative picture on the kingdom which may explain the legend of Japan's conquest of Silla by Empress Jingū. With one of its supportive allies gone and the growing threat of Silla, Japan began creating a stronger tie with Paekche, the only remaining ally in the peninsula. Even after Wa became the Yamato Kingship, Japan constantly sent military aids to Paekche later seen in the Battle of Baekgang where it battled with Silla yet again.

== Timeline ==
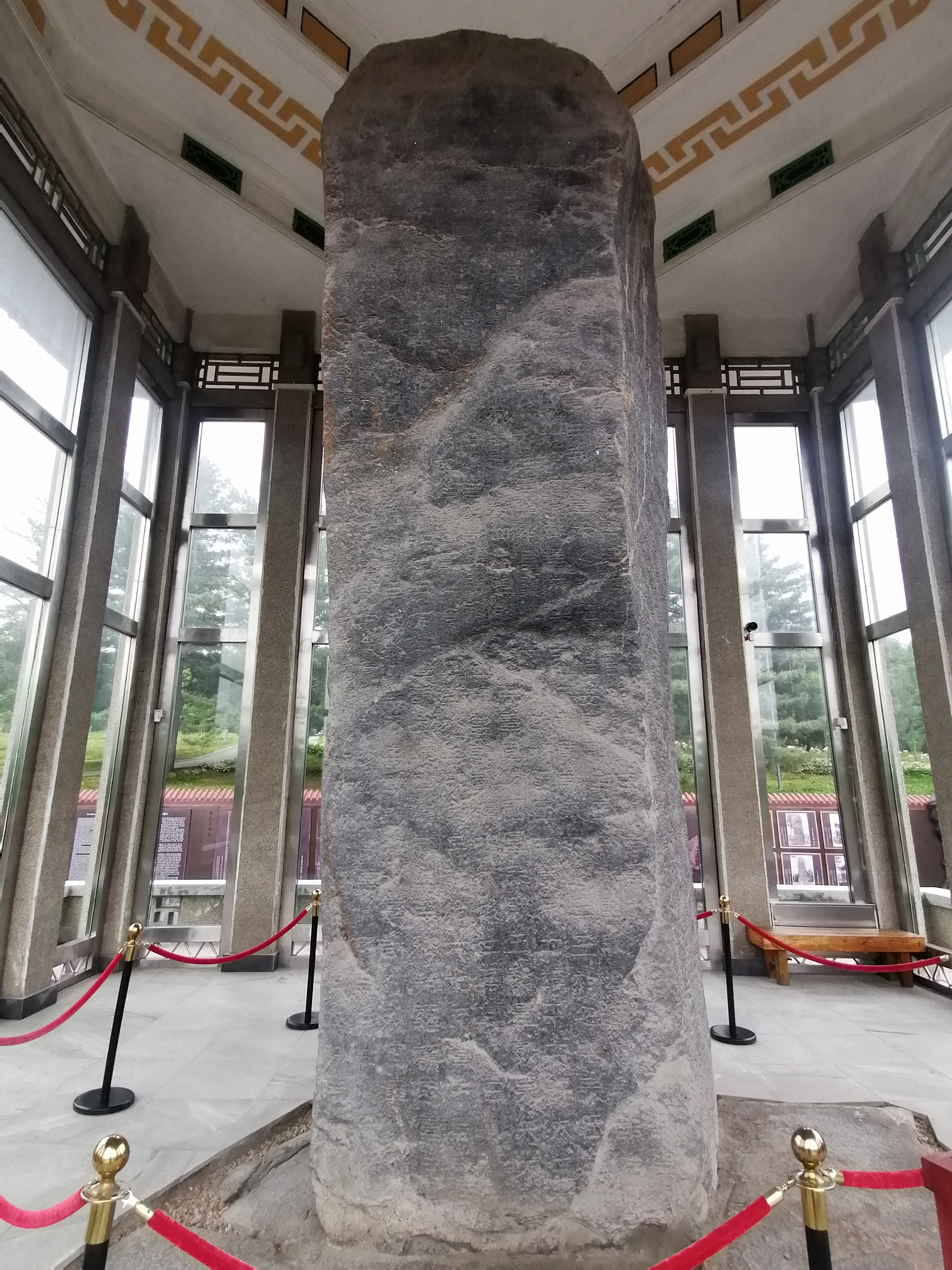
- The Gwanggaeto Stele of Goguryeo.
  396: Gwanggaeto the Great led his troops and attacked Paekche, conquering many castles along the way. Gwanggaeto captured the Paekche capital and forced Asin to surrender and become his subject. Gwanggaeto gained 58 towns and 700 villages, and returned home with hostages, including a Paekche prince and several ministers.
- 399: Paekche broke its previous allegiance to Goguryeo and allied with Wa. In Pyongyang, Gwanggaeto was greeted by the Silla envoy Silseong who notified him that Paekche and Wa troops were crossing the border to invade Silla, and requested Goguryeo's aid. As Silla was a loyal ally of Goguryeo, Gwanggaeto agreed to help them.
- 400: Gwanggaeto sent 50,000 soldiers to defend Silla. As Goguryeo troops reached the Silla capital, the Paekche–Kaya–Wa armies retreated toward Kaya. The Goguryeo and Silla alliance attacked and pursued the Paekche and Wa forces to the castle in Alla, where the Paekche, Wa, and Kaya troops surrendered.
- 404: Wa unexpectedly invaded the southern border of the former Daifang territory. Gwanggaeto led his troops and defeated the Wa forces in the vicinity of Pyongyang. The Wa army was defeated and many Wa soldiers were killed.

== See also ==
- Silla
- Goguryeo
- Paekche
- Kaya confederacy
- Wakoku
- Battle of Baekgang
- Invasion of the Three Koreas (三韓征伐; Sankan Seibatsu)
