= Bihwa Gaya =

- Hangul: 비화가야
- Hanja: 非火伽倻
- RR: Bihwa Gaya
- MR: Pihwa Kaya

Bihwa Gaya (Korean: 비화가야; Hanja: 非火伽倻), also known as Bijabal in Japanese records of the time, was one of the member states of the Gaya confederacy during the Three Kingdoms period of Korea. It was based near the modern-day city center of Changnyeong County in South Gyeongsang province, South Korea. It was conquered by Silla in the 6th century AD, some time before 555.

Bihwa Gaya is mentioned in the Goryeo Saryak and under the name Hijiho (比自㶱, Korean Revised Romanization: Bijabal) in the Japanese chronicle Nihonshoki. It may have arisen from the 3rd century Jinhan state of Bulsaguk (불사국, 不斯國) which was probably also located in modern-day Changnyeong. Archeological evidence suggests a close relationship between Bihwa Gaya and nearby Silla, although as part of the Gaya confederacy, Bihwa would frequently have been at war with Silla.

The royal tombs of Bihwa Gaya are located in Gyo-dong, Changnyeong-eup, in Changnyeong County. Some of these tombs were excavated during the colonial period in 1918, but all records of that excavation have since been lost. In 1973, a team of researchers from Busan's Dong-A University excavated several remaining tombs. These tombs appear to have been constructed in the 5th century AD. Some of them show indications of the live burial of members of the royal household. In 1996, a museum focusing on the relics of the Bihwa Gaya period opened adjacent to the tombs.

== See also ==
- Gaya confederacy
