= Chilseo-myeon =

Township in South Gyeongsang, South Korea

Coordinates: 35°20′34″N 128°29′14″E

- Hangul: 칠서면
- Hanja: 漆西面
- RR: Chilseo-myeon
- MR: Ch'ilsŏ-myŏn

Chilseo-myeon (Korean: 칠서면) is a myeon in northern Haman County, Gyeongsangnam-do, South Korea. It is composed of nine ri, and has a total area of 35.96 km^{2}. A largely rural area, it has a population of 6,568 (December 2004 reg.)

Local attractions include the temple of Musansa and the dinosaur footprints of Daechi-ri. A water purification facility operated by Masan City is also located in Chilseo-myeon.

Chilseo is a very small farming town There is a swimming pool and gym facility, the public bath/health center, the innumerable soju bars, singing rooms, hairdressers, two small grocery stores which are a 30-minute walk from Chilseo to Chilwon. Most of the landscape is filled with rice fields and grassy mountains. There is an elementary school located in Chilwon, a middle school and highschool in Chilseo along with a close by Christian church. There is only one temple, which is located in Chilwon, yet three Christian churches.

There is no bus station, but various bus stops located around town. Many traditional ways of life still exist such as adjumas drying their chile peppers for the Winter's kim chi on their house roofs, the elderly sitting under a bridge on the ground eating their lunches to escape the Summer's heat, farmers cultivating their land, dogs raised for meat in small cages and inhabitants making their purchases at the weekly traditional open air market located in Chilwon.
