= Gwanggaeto Stele =

Goguryeo memorial stele erected in 414

UNESCO World Heritage Site
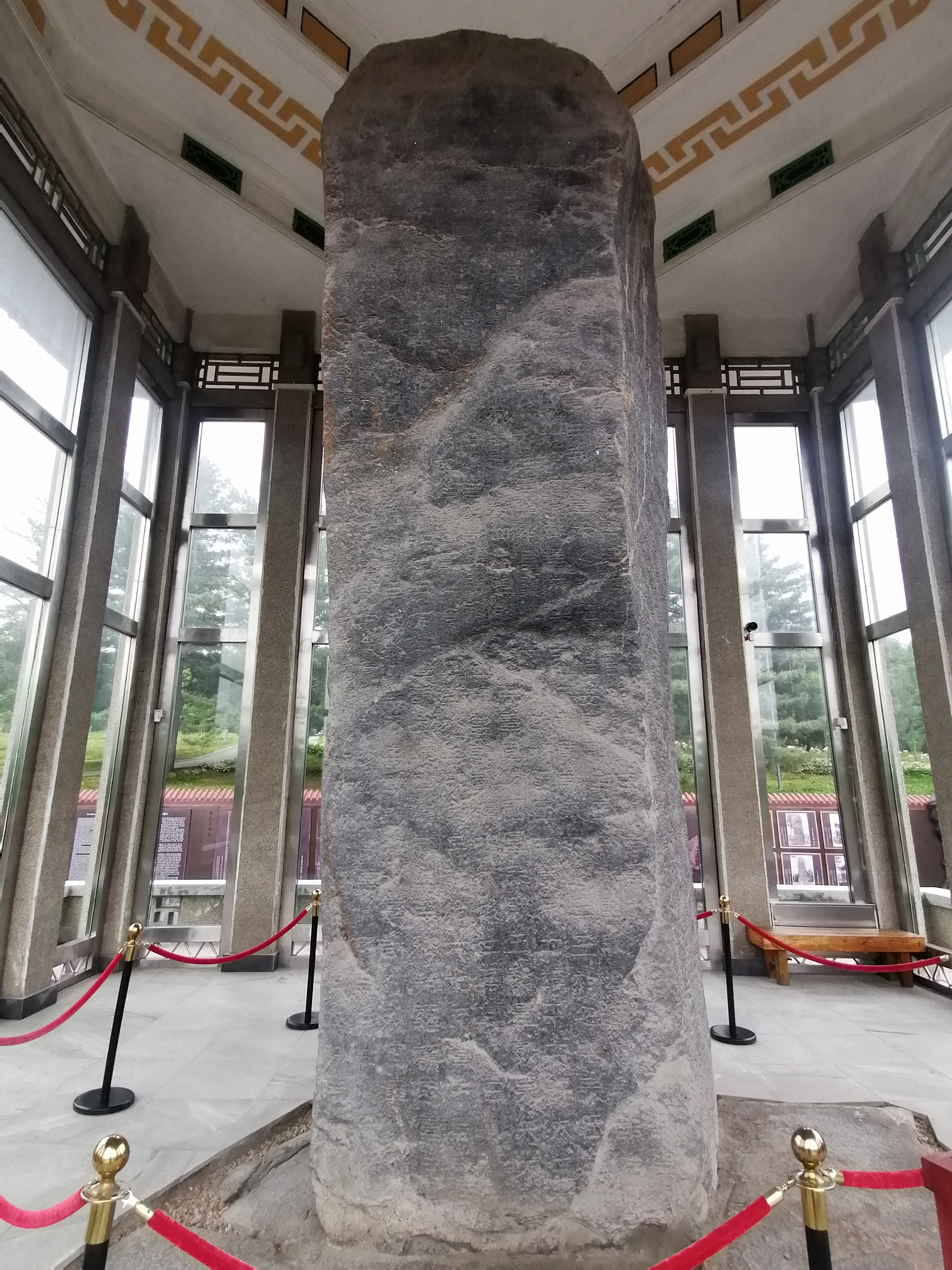
- Tombstone of King Gwanggaeto the Great

- Location within Jilin Location within China
- Location: Liaoning and Jilin in China
- Includes: Wunu Mountain City; Guonei City; Wandu Mountain City; Ranmou Tomb; Huanwen Tomb; Changchuan Tomb
- Criteria: Cultural: (i)(ii)(iii)(iv)(v)
- Reference: 1135
- Inscription: 2004 (28th Session)
- Area: 4,164.8599 ha (10,291.593 acres)
- Buffer zone: 14,142.4404 ha (34,946.731 acres)
- Coordinates: 41°08′41″N 126°12′51″E

Gwanggaeto Stele
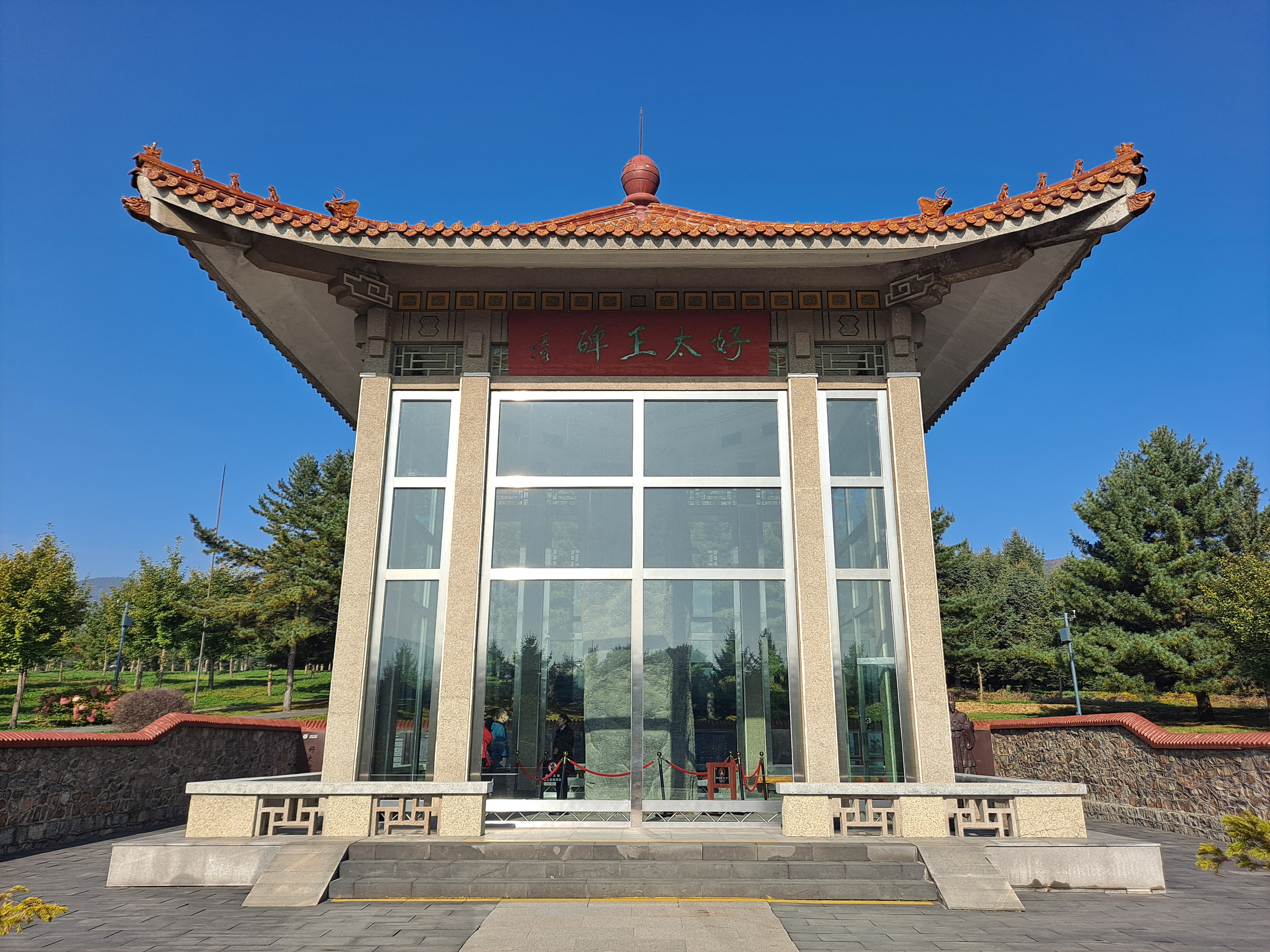
- The pavilion where the stele is housed

Chinese name
- Chinese: 好太王碑
Transcriptions
Standard Mandarin
- Hanyu Pinyin: Hǎotàiwáng Bēi

Korean name
- Hangul: 광개토왕릉비 or 호태왕비
- Hanja: 廣開土王陵碑 or 好太王碑
Transcriptions
- Revised Romanization: Gwanggaeto wangneungbi or Hotaewangbi
- McCune–Reischauer: Kwanggaet'o wangnŭngbi or Hot'aewangbi

The Gwanggaeto Stele is a memorial stele for the tomb of Gwanggaeto the Great of Goguryeo, erected in 414 by his son Jangsu. This monument to Gwanggaeto the Great is the largest engraved stele in the world. It stands near the tomb of Gwanggaeto in the present-day city of Ji'an along the Yalu River in Jilin Province, Northeast China, which was the capital of Goguryeo at that time. It is carved out of a single mass of granite, stands approximately 6.39m tall and has a girth of almost four meters. The inscription is written exclusively in Classical Chinese.

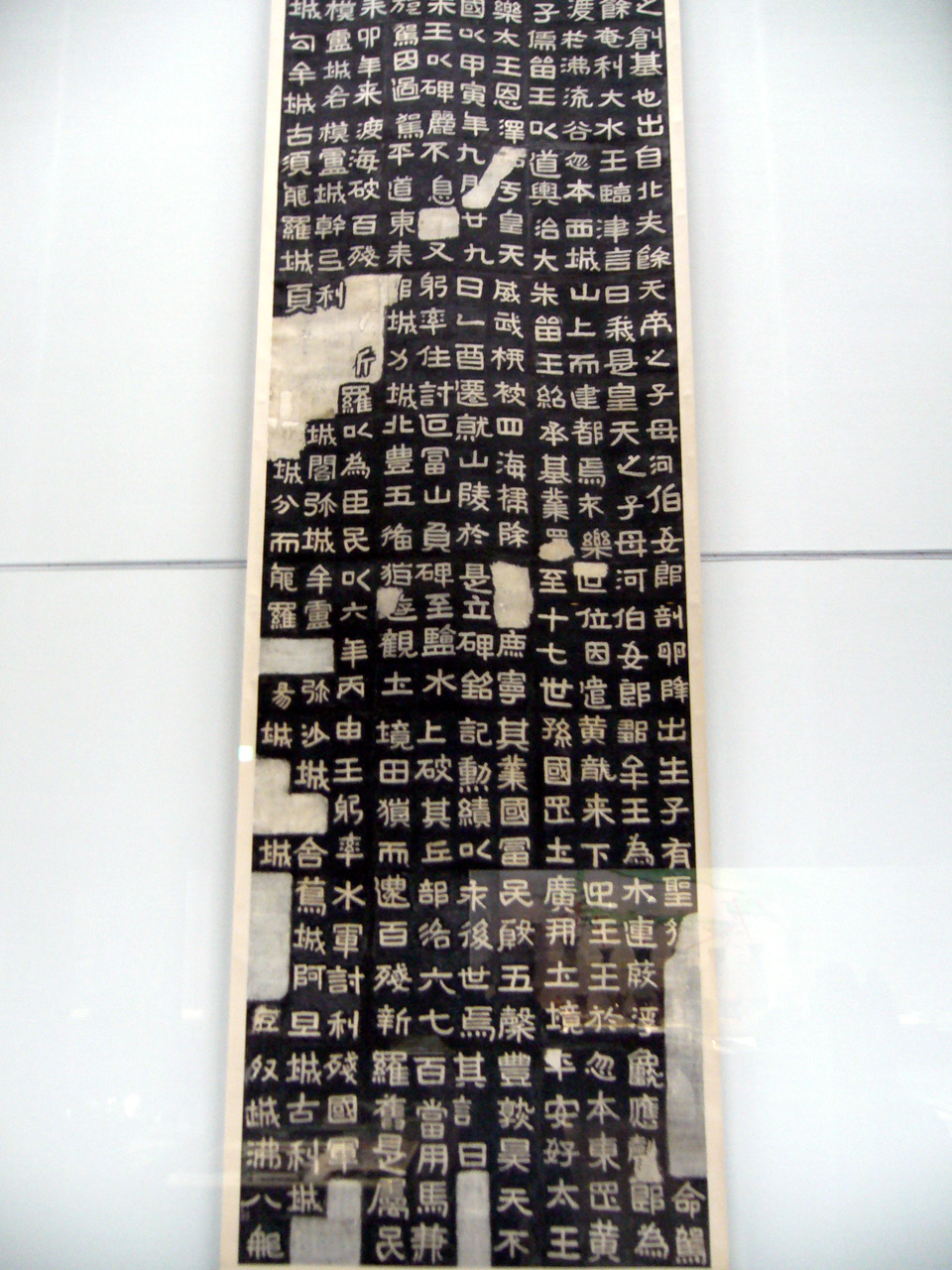
A rubbing of the Gwanggaeto Stele

The stele is one of the major primary sources for the history of Goguryeo, and supplies invaluable historical detail on Gwanggaeto's reign as well as insights into Goguryeo mythology. It has also become a focal point of national rivalries in East Asia manifested in the interpretations of the stele's inscription and the place of Goguryeo in modern historical narratives. An exact replica of the Gwanggaeto Stele stands on the grounds of the War Memorial of Seoul and the rubbed copies made in 1881 and 1883 are in the custody of China and Japan.

== Rediscovery ==
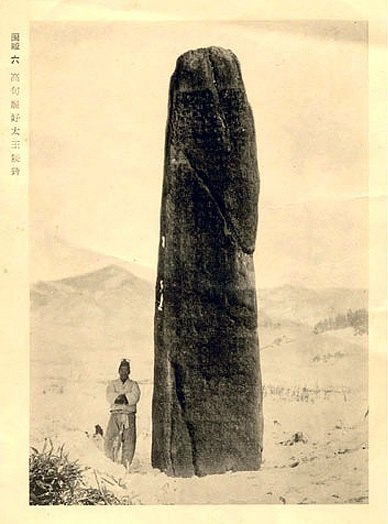
The Gwanggaeto Stele in 1903

The stele's location, in Ji'an in the northeastern Chinese province of Jilin, was key to its long neglect. Following the fall of Goguryeo in 668, and to a lesser extent the fall of its successor state Balhae in 926, the region drifted outside the sway of both Korean and Chinese geopolitics. Afterwards the region came under the control of numerous Manchurian states, notably the Jurchen and from the 16th century the Manchu.

When the Manchu conquered China in 1644 and established the Qing dynasty, they instituted a "closure policy" (fengjin 封禁) that blocked entry into a vast area in Manchuria north of the Yalu River, including the stele's site. This seclusion came to an end in the latter half of the 19th century, when the region was opened up for resettlement. In 1876, the Qing government established the Huairen County (Note: 懐仁; Wade-Giles: "Huai-jen") (now Huanren Manchu Autonomous County) to govern the area.

New settlers into the region around Ji'an began making use of the many bricks and baked tiles that could be found in the region to build new dwellings. The curious inscriptions on some of these tiles soon reached the ears of Chinese scholars and epigraphers. A few tiles were found inscribed "May the mausoleum of the Great King be secure like a mountain and firm like a peak". It was around 1876 that a local Chinese official named Guan Yueshan, (Note: Guan served the magistrate of Huairen County (李進熙 1973, p. 56, citing Ikeuchi Hiroshi (池内宏)'s Ji'an's County History)) who also dabbled as an amateur epigrapher, began collecting such tiles and discovered the mammoth stone stele of Gwanggaeto obscured under centuries of mud and overgrowth.

The discovery soon attracted the attention of Korean, Chinese and Japanese scholars, the third often supplemented by Japanese spies travelling incognito to spy the region's fortifications and natural layout, prescient of a future of increased international rivalry. Initially only rubbings of sporadic individual letters could be made, due to the overgrowth. (Note: Guan Yueshan made rubbings of one letter per sheet.) In order to uncover the entire inscription, the county magistrate in 1882 ordered the vegetation to be burnt off, causing damage to the stele's surface. (Note: The ink-rubbing artisan ordered by the magistrate to burn off the vegetation encrusting the monument was interviewed by Imanishi Ryū who stated with conviction this happened in 1882. Guan Yuenshan's superior named Zhang 章樾 was still magistrate of Huairen County until January 1882, but Yi Jin-hui conjectured a different governor named Chen 陳士芸 was responsible.)

Almost every inch of the stele's four sides were found to be covered with Chinese characters (nearly 1800 in total), each about the size of a grown man's hand. But rubbed copies could not initially be made due to the irregular surface and other factors, (Note: Yi also notes the lack of sturdy large paper and skilled stone-rubbing technicians.) so that the early batch of copied inscriptions were actually "tracings" rather than "rubbings". (Note: Tracings, i.e., shuanggou ben (双鉤本; "double-contour version") in Chinese and sōkōbon in Japanese ((Hatada 1979, p. 3), (李進熙 1973, pp. 68–9)) The full name of the technique is shuanggou tianmo (双鉤塡墨 "double-tracing and ink-filling"))

In 1883, a young Japanese officer named Sakō Kageaki (or "Sakao Kagenobu") traveling disguised as a civilian kanpo (Chinese medicine) herbalist while gathering intelligence in Manchuria. While in Liaoning he apparently heard of the stele's recent discovery, traveled to Ji'an sometime during April ~ July 1883, and procured a "tracing" of the stele's inscriptions to carry back to his homeland. The inscription drew significant attention from Japanese scholarship after the advent of this copy. Imperial Japanese Army General Staff Office invited leading sinologists and historians to decode the text, later publishing their findings in Kaiyoroku 會餘録, volume 5 (1889).

The first authentic rubbings of the full inscriptions were not made until 1887 according to one researcher. It was after the authentic "rubbings" (rather than "tracings") became available that Chinese scholars started studying the earnest, and the first scholarly paper produced by the Chinese was Wang Chih-hsiu (王志修; Wang Zhixiu), Kao-chü-li Yung-lo t'ai-wang ku pei k'ao (高句麗永樂太王古碑攷 1895). And Korea was not aware of the monument until Kaiyoroku was published in 1889. Thus, the Japanese scholars were the ones to make the first detailed analysis of the stele's ancient text.

== The inscription ==
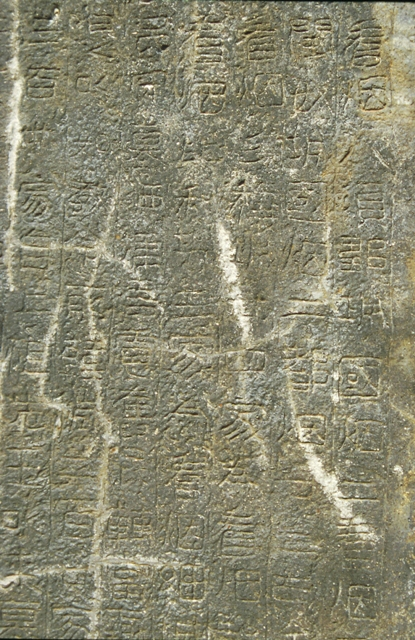
Detail of inscription

There is some discrepancy with regards to the number of inscribed characters. Some sources state that the stele has 1,802 characters, while others say it has 1,775. The inscribed text can be grouped by content into three parts. 1) Foundation myth of the Goguryeo kingdom; 2) the military exploits of King Gwanggaeto; and 3) personal record of the custodians of the monarch's grave. The first part details the legend of the Goguryeo's founder and his lineage while the second outlined Gwanggaeto's martial accomplishments, beginning with the conquest of Paeryo (稗麗) in 395. The record of the king's conquest was outlined in the form of a list of the castles he occupied and the surrender of the states conquered such as Paekche's in 396. The stele identified a total of seven conquests, which were corroborated by the historical accounts found in the Samguk sagi, or the Historical Records of the Three Kingdoms. Finally, the last part contains the list of custodians called Sumyoin, who were appointed to oversee the king's tomb.

== Foundation myth ==
The inscription thus traces lineage from the legendary founder of the kingdom to the King who is memorialized by the stele.

Note: Text written in italics in brackets has been reconstructed from glyphs chipped or eroded on the stone monument. (Note: The full text in classical Chinese is available at the Chinese wikisource))

Of old, when our first Ancestor King Ch'umo laid the foundations of our state, he came forth from Northern Buyeo (Note: "Northern Puyo") as the son of the Celestial Emperor. His mother, the daughter of Habaek, gave birth to him by cracking an egg and bringing her child forth from it. Endowed with heavenly virtue, King Ch'umo [accepted his mother's command and] made an imperial tour to the south. His route went by the way of Puyo's Great Omni River. Gazing over the ford, the king said, "I am Ch'umo, son of August Heaven and the daughter of the Earl of the River. Weave together the bulrushes for me so that the turtles will float to the surface." And no sooner had he spoken than [the God of the River] wove the bullrushes so that the turtles floated to the surface, whereupon he crossed over the river. Upon the mountain-fort west of Cholbon in Piryu Valley established his capital, wherein his family would long enjoy the hereditary position. Accordingly, he [ritually] summoned the Yellow Dragon to come down and "meet the king." The King was on the hill east of Cholbon, and the Yellow Dragon took him on its back and ascended to Heaven. He left a testamentary command to his heir apparent, King Yuryu, that he should conduct his government in accordance with the Way. Great King Churyu succeeded to rule and the throne was handed on, [eventually] to the seventeenth in succession, [who], having ascended the throne at twice-nine [i.e., eighteen], was named King Yongnak ("Eternal Enjoyment") (Gwanggaeto the Great)

The inscription continues with the king's obituary and an account of the erection of the stele.

== Chronology of Gwanggaeto Wars ==
The stele records entire battles of Gwanggaeto's reign and his triumphs. Many of the battles concern conflict with the Wa (people from what is now Japan). The king of Goguryeo is described as assisting Silla when it was invaded by the Wa, and punishing Baekje for allying with the Wa. (Note: In the inscriptions, Baekje (or Paekche 百済) are referred to as Baekjan (or Paekchan 百殘) Lee & De Bary 1997, p. 25.)

- Year 395 (Yongnak 5): (Note: This year was ulmi (乙未) in the Sexagenary cycle, the nexus between the "year of ul (wood-yin)" × the "year of the sheep")
  - The King led troops to defeat the Paeryeo (Note: Korean: 패려; Hanja: 稗麗; MR: P'aeryŏ. "Paeryeo" is also transliterated "Piryŏ" (Lee & De Bary 1997, p. 25) "Piryo" (Hirano 1977, p. 72) and "Pili" (Hatada 1979, p. 2)) tribe ( believed to be a Khitan tribe) and acquired their livestock. He inspected the state and returned in triumph.
- Year 396 (Yongnak 6):
  - This year, the King led troops and conquered many Baekje castles. (Note: "the King crossed the Ari River") As the troops reached the capital, the Baekje king paid reparations and swore to be a subject of Goguryeo, paying male and female captives and a thousand bolts of cloth in reparation. Gwanggaetto returned home with a Baekje prince and nobles as hostages.
- Year 398 (Yongnak 8):
  - Assigned troops to conquer the Poshen (帛慎) [presumably a tribe of the Sushen people] and to capture 300 people. Since then, they have sent tribute to Goguryeo.
- Year 399 (Yongnak 9):
  - Baekje broke previous promise and allied with Wa. Gwanggaeto advanced to Pyongyang. There he saw Silla's messenger who told him that many Wa troops were crossing the border to invade and make Silla's king a vassal of Wa, and so asked Goguryeo for help. As Silla swore to be Goguryeo's subject, the King agreed to save them.
- Year 400 (Yongnak 10):
  - The King sent 50,000 troops to save Silla. Wa's troops retreated just before the Goguryeo troops reached the Silla capital. They chased the Wa forces to a castle in Imna Gaya (Mimana). The Wa troops in the castle soon surrendered.
  - (Many of the following characters are absent, though some legible characters include "Alla soldiers in defense (安羅人戍兵)", "Wa (倭)", and "collapse (潰)", and likely to be records of further battles against Gaya and Wa, but no details are available.)
- Year 404 (Yongnak 14):
  - Wa unexpectedly invaded southern border at Daifang. (Note: Daebang) The King led troops from Pyongyang to prevail. Wa troops collapsed with enormous casualties.
- Year 407 (Yongnak 17):
  - The King sent 50,000 troops, both foot soldiers and mounted, and battled (the inscription that mention the opponent state is marred). (Note: Baekche or Hou-yen from Liaodong Peninsula have been conjectured (Hatada 1979, p. 2), and some scholars postulate Pyongyang to have been the battle zone.)
- Year 410 (Yongnak 20):
  - Eastern Buyeo (東夫餘) (Note: Also transliterated "Tung-fu-yü" Chinese style) ceased tribute to Goguryeo. The King led troops to conquer them. Eastern Buyeo was surprised (and surrendered. Some characters are also scratched out in this passage). As they submitted to the King's kindness, there was also a noble who followed the King to Goguryeo.

The inscription states that since the "Sinmyo" year (391 AD), (Note: sinmyo 辛卯 in the Sexagenary cycle is nexus of the "year of sin (metal-yin)" × the "Year of the rabbit") the Wa had been crossing the sea into Korea. The passage continues by saying that "it" subjugated the two kingdoms Baekche and Silla. Japanese scholarship generally considers that Wa is the subjugators being referred to here. However, Korean scholarship generally disagrees, and renders this portion as Goguryeo's claims to the two kingdoms as "our subject peoples". Some scholars also posit that "Wa" here does not refer to the "Japanese" people in the conventional sense at all.

(For further information on the "sinmyo passage" controversy, see section below)

== Debate over an ancient message ==
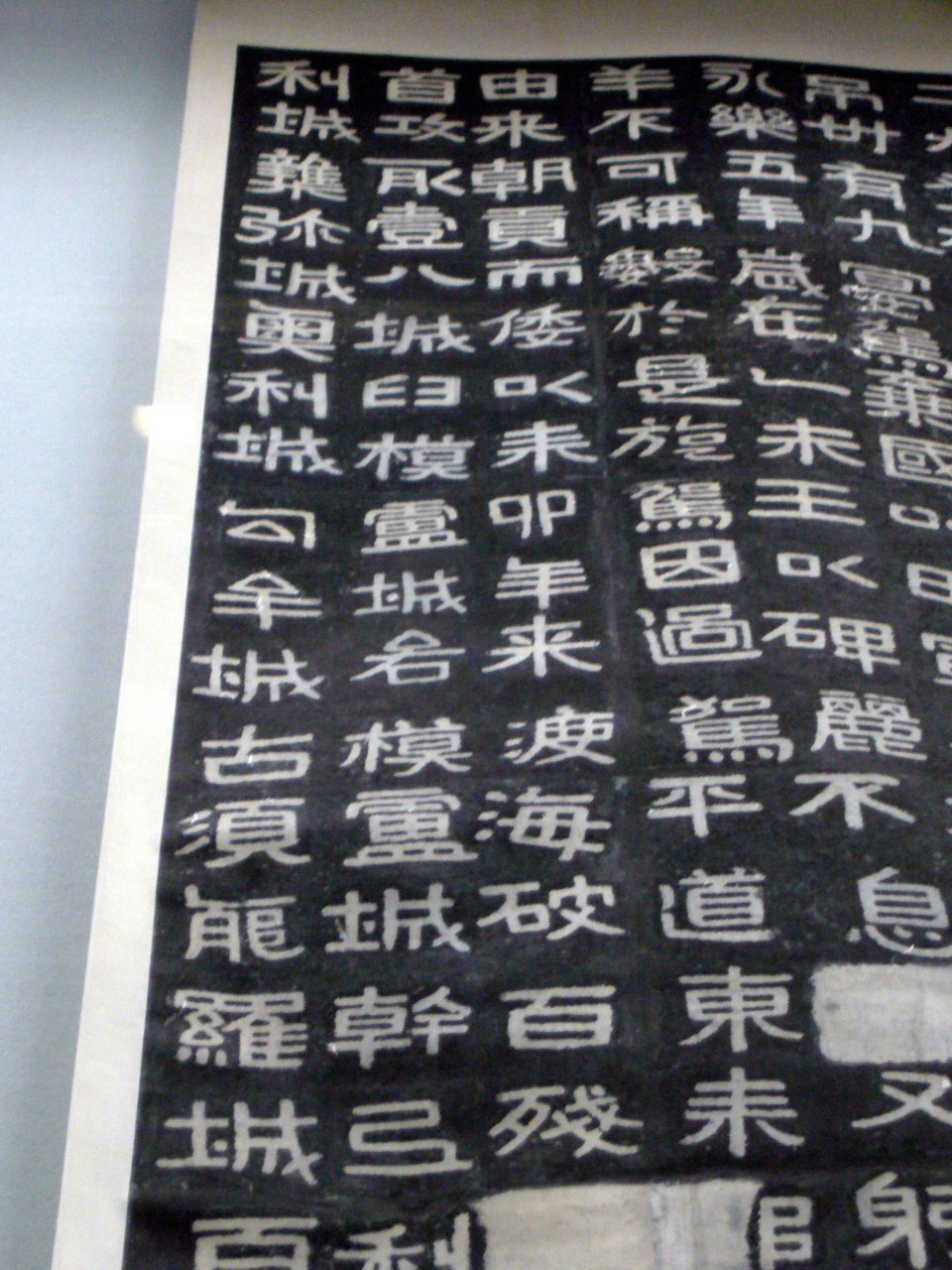
The controversial Sinmyo passage, referring to events of the year 391 AD

It soon became clear that the stele was dedicated to king Gwanggaeto of Goguryeo, who reigned in 391–413 CE. It also became clear the stele was raised as a grand memorial epitaph to the celebrated monarch, whose empty tomb lay nearby. Though historians and epigraphers still grapple with the interpretation of portions of the text, the inscription's general layout is clear. One face provides a retelling of the foundation legend of Goguryeo. Another provides terms for the maintenance of Gwanggaeto's tomb in perpetuity. It is the rest of the inscription, which provides a synopsis of Gwanggaeto's reign and his numerous martial accomplishments (see section above) that is rife with the most controversy.

The most controversial portion of the stele's narrative has come to be known simply as the "Sinmyo passage". The sinmyo passage as far as it is definitively legible reads thus (with highly defaced or unreadable characters designated by an X):

而 倭 以 辛 卯 年 來 渡 海 破 百 殘 X X [X斤 (新)] 羅 以 爲 臣 民

=== Interpretation ===
Disagreement in the "sinmyo passage" of year 391 is whether it states that the Goguryeo subjugated Baekje and Silla, as Korean scholars maintain, or whether it states that Wa had at one time subjugated Baekje and Silla, as Japanese scholars have traditionally interpreted.

The Imperial Japanese Army General Staff Office, which learned about the stele and obtained a rubbed copy from its member Kageaki Sakō in 1884, became intrigued over a passage describing the king's military campaigns for the sinmyo 辛卯 year of 391 (sinmyo being a year designator in the sexagenary cycle that characterizes the traditional Sino-oriented East Asian calendar). Some officers in the Japanese army and navy conducted research during the 1880s and the rubbed copy was later published in 1889. Most Japanese scholars, notably Masatomo Suga, interpreted the passage as follows (brackets designating a "reading into" the text where the character is not legible):

And in the sinmyo year (辛卯年) the Wa (倭) came and crossed the sea (來渡海) and defeated (破) Baekje (百 殘), [unknown], and [Sil]la (新羅) and made them (以爲) subjects (臣民)

They presumed that Wa referred to a centralized Japanese government at the time that controlled the entire western part of Japan.

In the 1910s and 20s, Torii Ryūzō and other Japanese scholars traveled to Ji'an and observed the stele close hand. They found that the inscription had been repaired by clay and lime, and therefore questioned the credibility of the rubbed copy.

The first Korean scholarly study challenging the Japanese interpretation was published by Chŏng In-bo in 1955. He supposed that the subjects of the sentence 渡海破 and 以爲臣民 were respectively Goguryeo and Baekje. By Chŏng's interpretation the entire passage read as follows:

And in the sinmyo year Wa [invaded Goguryeo], [and Goguryeo also] came and crossed the sea and defeated [Wa]. Then Baekje [allied with Wa] and subjugated [Sil]la

In 1959 the Japanese scholar Teijiro Mizutani published another important study. He had acquired rubbed copies made before the repair of the stele and concluded that Sakō's copy had not been made by the rubbing method but rather had been traced, a method known in China as shuanggou tianmo (双鉤塡墨).

The North Korean scholar Kim reported his conclusions in a 1963 article. He had studied the Japanese chronicles Kojiki and Nihonshoki, and concluded that Wa referred to colonies of Samhan in Japan. He claimed that these colonies were established by Korean immigrants and was centered in Kyūshū, Kinai, Izumo. Later, according to Kim, the colonies were absorbed by Yamato polity, which was also founded by Koreans. He also posited that the subject of 來渡海破百殘 was Goguryeo, and 百殘 was not the Baekje kingdom but Baekje's colony in Japan. Other North Korean scholar also argued for Goguryeo's invasion of Japan.

Many Korean scholars reject the interpretation that Japan (倭) conquered (破) Baekje and Silla. It is difficult to tell when sentences begin or end because of the absence of punctuation and the necessity of reading into the text via context. Furthermore, the subjects Baekje and Silla are not recognizably mentioned in the passage; only the first character for "Baekje" (百) is noted, and even the supposed first character of Silla is not complete (only 斤 as opposed to 新). Furthermore, the character "jan" (殘) was a character used derogatively by Goguryeo in place of the character "jae" (濟) in Baekje's official name (this may have denoted wishful thinking on the part of Goguryeo that another nation came and conquered Baekje). Thus, when taking into consideration the major absence of characters and lack of punctuation, the passage reads:

And in the sinmyo year the Wa (Japanese) crossed the sea. (Abbreviation of someone's title) made (?) subjects of (?)

However, further analysis of the passage is that Goguryeo, not Japan, crossed the sea and defeated Baekje or Wa.

In the case of this interpretation, and the abbreviation of King Gwanggaeto's title in the passage, the passage states:

And in the sinmyo year the Wa crossed the sea. King Gwanggaeto (abbreviation) made Silla and Baekje subjects of (?)

Some point out several facts that put in doubt the traditional Japanese interpretation of the sinmyo passage. Firstly, the term Wa at the time the stele was made did not solely refer to people from Japan but could also refer to the people from southern Korean, particularly from the Gaya Confederacy.

=== Conspiracy theories ===
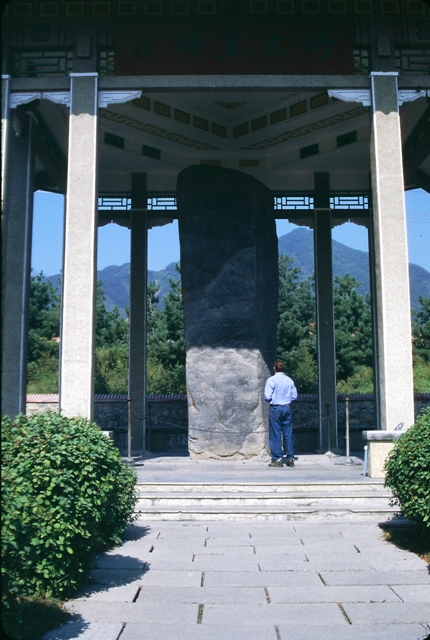
The Gwanggaeto Stele inside its pavilion

In 1972 the Zainichi Korean scholar Lee Jin-hui (Yi Jin-hui; romaji: Ri Jinhi) reported the most controversial theory of the interpretation. He claimed the stele had been intentionally damaged by the Japanese Army in the 20th century to justify the Japanese invasion of Korea. According to his books, Sakō altered the copy and later the Japanese General Staff thrice sent a team to make the falsification of the stele with lime. In 1981, the Korean Lee Hyung-gu began putting forth the argument, based on the irregularity of the Chinese character style and grammar, that the sinmyo passage was altered so as 後 read 倭, and 不貢因破 read 來渡海破. Thus, the subject of the sinmyo passage becomes Goguryeo. Geng Tie-Hua questioned another character, claiming 毎 was altered to 海.

Chinese scholars participated in studies of the stele from the 1980s. Wang Jianqun interviewed local farmers and decided the intentional fabrication had not occurred and the lime was pasted by local copy-making workers to enhance readability. He criticized Lee Jin-hui's claim. He considered 倭 ("Wa") word meaning is not a country but a pirate group, and he also denied Japan dominated the southern part of Korea. Xu Jianxin of the Chinese Academy of Social Sciences discovered the earliest rubbed copy which was made before 1881. He also concluded that there was no evidence the Japanese had damaged any of the stele characters.

Today, most Chinese scholars deny the conspiracy theory proposed by Lee Jin-hui in light of the newly discovered rubbed copy.

In the project of writing a common history textbook, Kim Tae-sik of Hongik University (Korea) denied Japan's theory. But, Kōsaku Hamada of Kyushu University (Japan) reported his interpretation of the Gwanggaeto Stele text, neither of them adopting Lee's theory in their interpretations.

=== Relations to other chronicles and archaeological records ===
In refuting the interpretation that Wa conquered Baekje and Silla, some Korean scholars alleges that it is unreasonable that a monument honoring the triumphs of a Goguryeo king singles out a Japanese ("Wa") victory as worthy of mention on the stele (if one follows the Japanese interpretation).

Generally, Japanese scholars points out that the rhetoric of inscription describes Gwanggaeto's battle as "overcoming the trying situation". Yukio Takeda claims that "Wa's invasion" was used as such situation when describing battles against Baekje. Some Japanese scholars also propose that Wa's power was more or less exaggerated by Goguryeo to illustrate the triumph of the King, and the sinmyo passage does not necessarily prove the power of Wa in Korean peninsula of the late 4th century.

On the other hand, they generally reject the Korean interpretation because the stele says Baekje was previously a state subservient to Goguryeo before the sinmyo passage and that recording the conquest into Baekje would result tautology in this section of the stele. Therefore, the statement in the stele that claims Baekje was a Goguryeo subject before the sinmyo passage would be propaganda on the part of Goguryeo; thus the conquest of Baekje would not be redundant.

Further, Japanese arbitrarily assert the Korean interpretation which claim Goguryeo as the subject that conquered Baekje and Silla as an inconsistency with the preceding phrase "crossed the sea." But, it is probable that the phrase indicate Battle in Gwanmi, a maritime fortress of Baekje until 391.

== See also ==
- History of Korea
- Three Kingdoms of Korea
- Silla–Goguryeo and Paekche–Kaya–Wa War

== Bibliography ==
- Chavannes, Edouard. "Les Monuments de l'Ancien Royaume Coréen de Kao-Keou-Li". T'oung Pao 2 9(1908):236–265.
- Courant, Maurice. "Stele Chinoise de Royaume de Koguryô". Journal Asiatique, March–April 1898:210–238.
- Grayson, James H (1977). "Mimana, A Problem in Korean Historiography". Korea Journal. 17 (8): 65–69. Archived from the original on 6 March 2007.
- Hatada, Takashi (1979), "An Interpretation of the King Kwanggaet'o Inscription", Korean Studies, 3, translated by V. Dixon Morris: 1–17, doi:10.1353/ks.1979.0007, JSTOR 23717824, S2CID 162255619
- Hirano, Kunio (1977), "The Yamato state and Korea in the fourth and fifth centuries", Acta Asiatica, 31: 51–82
- Im, Ki-chung. "Thoughts on the original stone rubbing of the Hot'aewang stele in the collection of Beijing University." Journal of Japanology, No. 14 (Nov. 1995):194–216.
- Kane, Daniel C. (March–April 2002), "Enigma in Stone: a Monument in Northeastern China fuels a Modern Debate over Ancient History", Archaeology Magazine: 60–66, JSTOR 41779666.
- Kang, Hugh. "The Historiography of the King Kwanggaet'o Stele." In History, Language and Culture in Korea: Proceedings of the 20th Conference of the Association of Korean Studies in Europe (AKSE). Youngsook Pak and Jaehoon Yeon, comps. London: Eastern Art Publishing, 2001.
- Kim, Joo-Young. "Jian: Vestiges of the Koguryô Spirit". Koreana Magazine 10 (1)(Spring 1996):64–69.
- Kim, J.Y. "The Kwanggaet'o Stele Inscription." In Ian Nish, ed. Contemporary European Writing on Japan: Scholarly Views from Eastern and Western Europe. Kent, England: Paul Norbury Publishers, 1988.
- Kirkland, J. Russell (1981), "The 'Horseriders' in Korea: A Critical Evaluation of a Historical Theory", Korean Studies, 5: 109–128, doi:10.1353/ks.1981.0005, JSTOR 23718816, S2CID 162271106.
- Lee, Peter H; De Bary, Wm. Theodore, eds. (2013) [1997], Sources of Korean Tradition, Yongho Ch'oe、Hugh H. W. Kang, Columbia University Press, pp. 24–26, ISBN 978-0231515313
- Mohan, Pankaj N (2004). "Rescuing a Stone from Nationalism: A Fresh Look at the Kwanggaeto Stele of Koguryo". Journal of Inner and East Asian Studies. 1: 89–115.
- Pai, Hyung Il. Constructing "Korean" Origins: A Critical Review of Archaeology, Historiography, and Racial Myth in Korean State-Formation Theories. Cambridge, Massachusetts:Harvard University Press, 2000.
- Suematsu, Yasukazu (1980). "The Development of Studies of the King Hao-t'ai Inscription: with Special Reference to the Research of Mizutani Teijirō". Memoirs of the Research Department of the Toyo Bunko (38): 1–37.
- Szczesniak, Bolesaw (January 1951). "The Kotaio Monument". Monumenta Nipponica. 7 (1/2). Kōdansha: 242–272. doi:10.2307/2382957. JSTOR 2382957.
- Yi, Jin-hui (李進煕 / Ri Jinhi) (1985) [1973], 好太王碑の謎 日本古代史を書きかえる [Mysteries of Kōtaiō monument: rewriting ancient Japanese history], Kōdansha (in Japanese)
