= Kaya confederacy =

42–562 confederacy in southern Korea

Coordinates: 35°09′36″N 128°13′48″E

Kaya
- 42 CE–562 CE
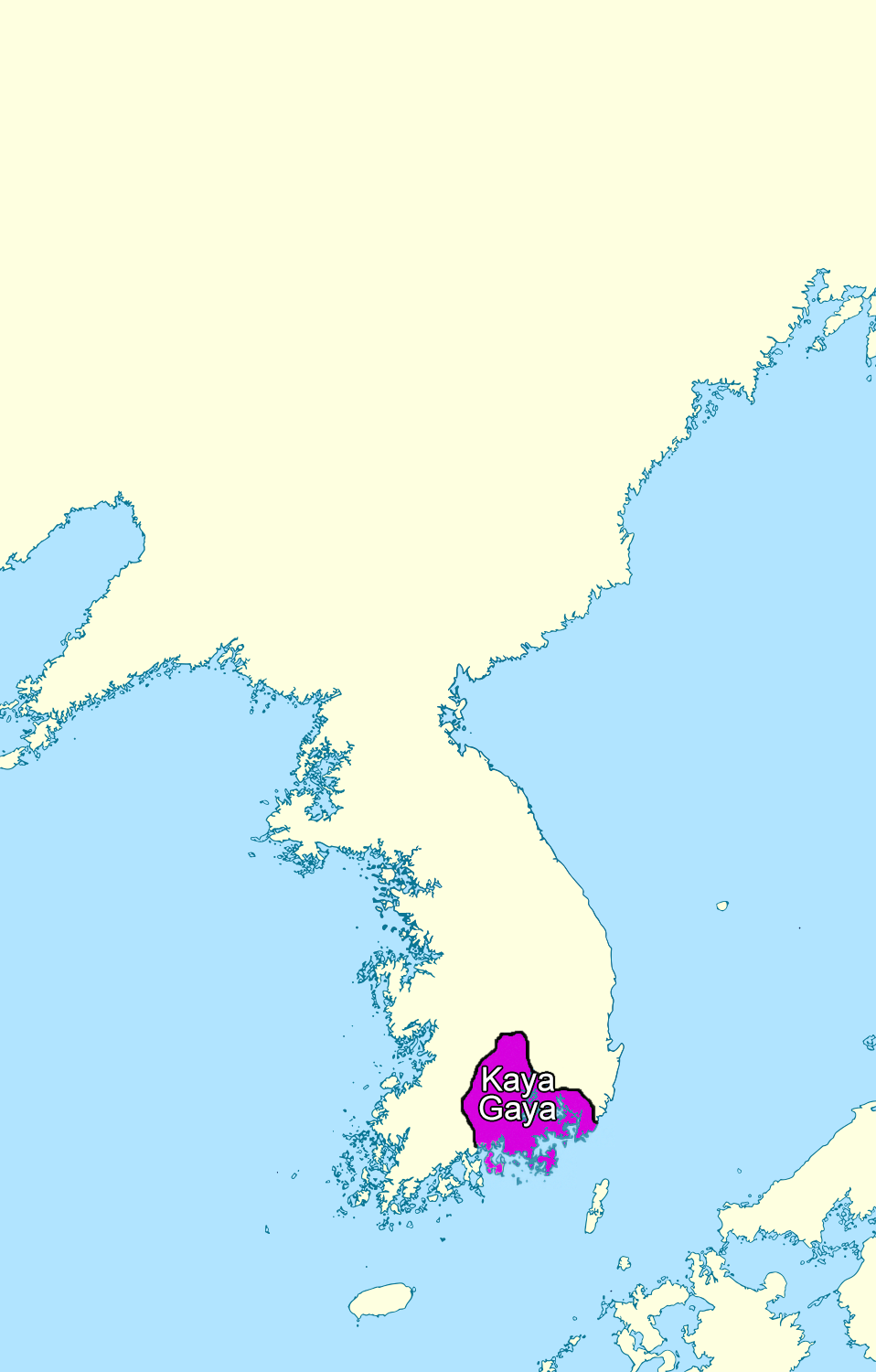
- Kaya in the 5th century
- Common languages: Han, Gaya, possibly Peninsular Japonic
- Religion: Musok, later Buddhism
- Government: Confederation
  - 42–199: Suro (first, Geumgwan)
  - ? – 562: Doseolji (last, Dae)
- Historical era: Ancient
  - Establishment: 42 CE
  - Fall of Geumgwan Gaya: 532
  - Submission to Silla: 562 CE
Preceded by	Succeeded by
Byeonhan confederacy	Silla; Baekje
- Today part of: South Korea

Korean name
- Hangul: 가야
- Hanja: 加耶; 伽倻
- RR: Gaya
- MR: Kaya
- IPA: [ka.ja]

The Kaya confederacy (Korean: 가야; Hanja: 加倻), also romanized as Gaya confederacy, was a Korean confederacy of territorial polities in the Nakdong River basin of southern Korea, growing out of the Byeonhan confederacy of the Samhan period.

The traditional period used by historians for Kaya chronology is AD 42–532. Geumgwan Gaya, the ruling state of the confederacy, was conquered in 532 and the last holdout, Daegaya fell in 562. According to archaeological evidence in the third and fourth centuries some of the city-states of Byeonhan evolved into the Kaya confederacy, which was later annexed by Silla, one of the Three Kingdoms of Korea. The individual polities that made up the Kaya confederacy have been characterized as small city-states. The material culture remains of Kaya culture mainly consist of burials and their contents of mortuary goods that have been excavated by archaeologists. Archaeologists interpret mounded burial cemeteries of the late third and early fourth centuries such as Daeseong-dong in Gimhae and Bokcheon-dong in Busan as the royal burial grounds of Kaya polities.

== Names ==
Although most commonly referred to as Kaya (가야; 加耶; 伽耶; 伽倻; [kaja]), probably due to the imprecision of transcribing Korean words into hanja, historical sources use a variety of names, including Karak (가락; 駕洛; 迦落; [kaɾak]), Kara (가라; 加羅; 伽羅; 迦羅; 柯羅; [kaɾa]), Karyang (가량; 加良; [kaɾjaŋ]), and Kuya (구야; 狗耶; [kuja]). According to Christopher I. Beckwith, "The spelling Kaya is the modern Korean reading of the characters used to write the name; the pronunciation /kara/ (transcriptionally *kala) is certain."

In Japanese, Kaya is often referred to as Mimana (任那), a name with considerable present-day political connotations. However, another word called "Kara (から)" was used when alluding to ancient Korea, a word that is believed to have derived from the alternate spelling of Kaya, Kara (加羅) which is now represented by three separate characters: 韓, 漢 and 唐 in kun'yomi. It is thought that the meaning of "Korea" was initially preserved in Japanese in the word "Kara" which later expanded to include "China, then mainland East Asia" and, more recently, an even more vague sense of "the nations overseas or foreign countries".

== Languages ==
Linguists, including Vovin and Janhunen, suggest that Japonic languages were spoken in large parts of the southern Korean Peninsula. According to Vovin, these "Peninsular Japonic languages" were replaced by Koreanic-speakers (possibly belonging to the Han-branch).

The later Gaya language likely belonged to the Koreanic Han languages.

The genetic diversity in the Kaya kingdom region is linked to Jomon-related ancestry.

== History ==
According to a legend written in the Samguk yusa in the 13th century, six eggs descended from heaven in the year AD 42 with a message that they would be kings. Six boys were born and matured within 12 days. One of them, named Suro, became the king of Geumgwan Gaya, and the other five founded the remaining five Gayas: Daegaya, Seongsan Gaya, Ara Gaya, Goryeong Gaya, and Sogaya.

The Kaya polities evolved out of the chiefly political structures of the twelve tribes of the ancient Byeonhan confederacy, one of the Samhan confederacies. The loosely organized chiefdoms resolved into six Kaya groups, centered on Geumgwan Kaya. Based on archaeological sources and the limited written records, scholars have identified the late 3rd century as a period of transition from Byeonhan to Kaya, noting increasing military activity and changing funerary customs. This transition was also associated with the replacement of the previous elite in some principalities (including Daegaya) by elements from the Buyeo kingdom, which brought a more militaristic ideology and style of rule.

After the Eight Port Kingdoms War (浦上八國 亂) (c. 209 – c. 212) between Silla and Kaya, Kaya was influenced by Silla's southeast peninsular hegemony, but diplomatically utilized the influence of Paekche and Japan to maintain independence. The Kaya confederacy disintegrated under pressure from Goguryeo between 391 and 412, although the last Kaya polities remained independent until they were conquered by Silla in 562, as punishment for assisting Paekche in a war against Silla.

In 529, Silla destroyed Takgitan Gaya (啄己呑國) under the pretext of its alliance with Daegaya and took half of Taksun Gaya's (卓淳國) territory. This led Daegaya to distrust the Kaya and begin uniting around the Ara Gaya, which was maintaining a strong power. In order to escape interference between Paekche and Silla in Kaya, the Ara Gaya invited Silla, Paekche, and Japan to hold the Anra Conference (安羅會議). Although they wanted to pressure Silla through the meeting to rebuild the Takgitan Kaya (啄己呑國) and raise the international status of Anra, Paekche preferred strong diplomacy and Silla was not interested in it. Although Japan was pro-Anra Gaya, it was unable to help due to internal problems.

In 541 and 544, Paekche led the Sabi Conferences (泗沘會議), which were participated in by seven countries including Ara. However, Ara still did not fully trust in Paekche. As a result of the conference, Kaya attacked Goguryeo alongside the Silla-Paekche alliance and acquired Seoul. In this attack, Paekche was betrayed by Silla and Kaya was also absorbed by Silla.

== Economy ==
Polities were situated in the alluvial flats of tributary river valleys and the mouth of the Nakdong. In particular, the mouth of the Nakdong has fertile plains, direct access to the sea, and rich iron deposits. Kaya polities had economies that were based on agriculture, fishing, casting, and long-distance trade. They were particularly known for its iron-working, as Byeonhan had been before it. Kaya polities exported abundant quantities of iron ore, iron armor, and other weaponry to Paekche and the Kingdom of Wa. In contrast to the largely commercial and non-political ties of Byeonhan, Kaya polities seem to have attempted to maintain strong political ties with those kingdoms as well.

== Politics ==
Several ancient historical records list a number of polities of Kaya. For example, Goryeo Saryak (고려사략; 高麗史略) lists five: Geumgwan Gaya, Goryeong Gaya, Bihwa Gaya, Ara Gaya, and Seongsan Gaya.

Traditionally, the Kaya confederacy enjoyed good relations with Japan and Paekche, such as when the three states allied against Goguryeo and Silla in the Goguryeo-Wa War. Records indicate Kaya would, alongside Paekche, regularly send economic, cultural, and technological aid to Japan in exchange for military and political aid, as the Yamato court desired technological progress and cultural advancement while Paekche and the Kaya states desired Japan's military aid in their wars against Silla and Goguryeo.

The various Kaya polities formed a confederacy in the 2nd and 3rd centuries that was centered on the heartland of Geumgwan Gaya in modern Gimhae. After a period of decline, the confederacy was revived around the turn of the 5th and 6th centuries, this time centered on Daegaya of modern Goryeong. However, it was unable to defend itself against the incursions and attacks of the neighboring kingdom of Silla. Eventually, all of the Kaya confederacy was absorbed into Silla.

After the fall of the Kaya confederacy, many of the nobility and elite of the confederated states were integrated into the ranks of Silla's bone-rank system including the royal houses of the defeated Kaya confederacy. One such example was the Sillan General Kim Yu-sin who played a critical role in the unification of the Three Kingdoms of Korea. Kim was the great-grandchild of King Guhae of Geumgwan Kaya, the last ruler of the Geumgwan Kaya state. As a result, Kim was given the rank of "true bone" which was the second highest rank one could attain, in part because the royal family of Geungwan Kaya, the Gimhae Kim clan were intermarried with the Gyeongju Kim clan, which was a prominent noble house in Silla.

=== Member statelets ===
- Geumgwan Gaya/Garak state
- Daegaya/Banpa state
- Sogaya/Goja state
- Ara Gaya/Alla state
- Seongsan Gaya/Byeokjin state
- Goryeong Gaya
- Bihwa Gaya/Biji state, occasionally classified as the member of Jinhan confederacy.

== Mimana/Imna controversy ==
Political and trade relations with Japan have been a source of controversy in both Korea and Japan. Japanese publicists during the twentieth century looked to the Nihon Shoki, which claims that Kaya (named "Mimana" also "Kara" in Japanese) was a military outpost of Japan during the Yamato period (300–710). While there is no evidence to support this, the claim has nonetheless been advocated at various times by Japanese imperialists, nationalists and press to justify the Japanese colonial rule of Korea between 19th and 20th centuries.

Archaeological evidence suggests that Kaya polities were the main exporter of technology and culture to Kyushu at that time. The theory of a Japanese outpost is widely rejected in Korea and Japan as there were no Japanese local groups at the time that had a strong enough military power to conquer Kaya or any other part of Korea. The technology of Kaya was more advanced than that of the Japanese dynasties of the time.

Though this theory has been largely refuted since the 1970s, it remains a sensitive and re-occurring issue in modern-day.

In 2010, a joint study group of historians sponsored by the governments of Japan and South Korea agreed that Kaya had never been militarily colonized by ancient Japan.

== Gallery ==
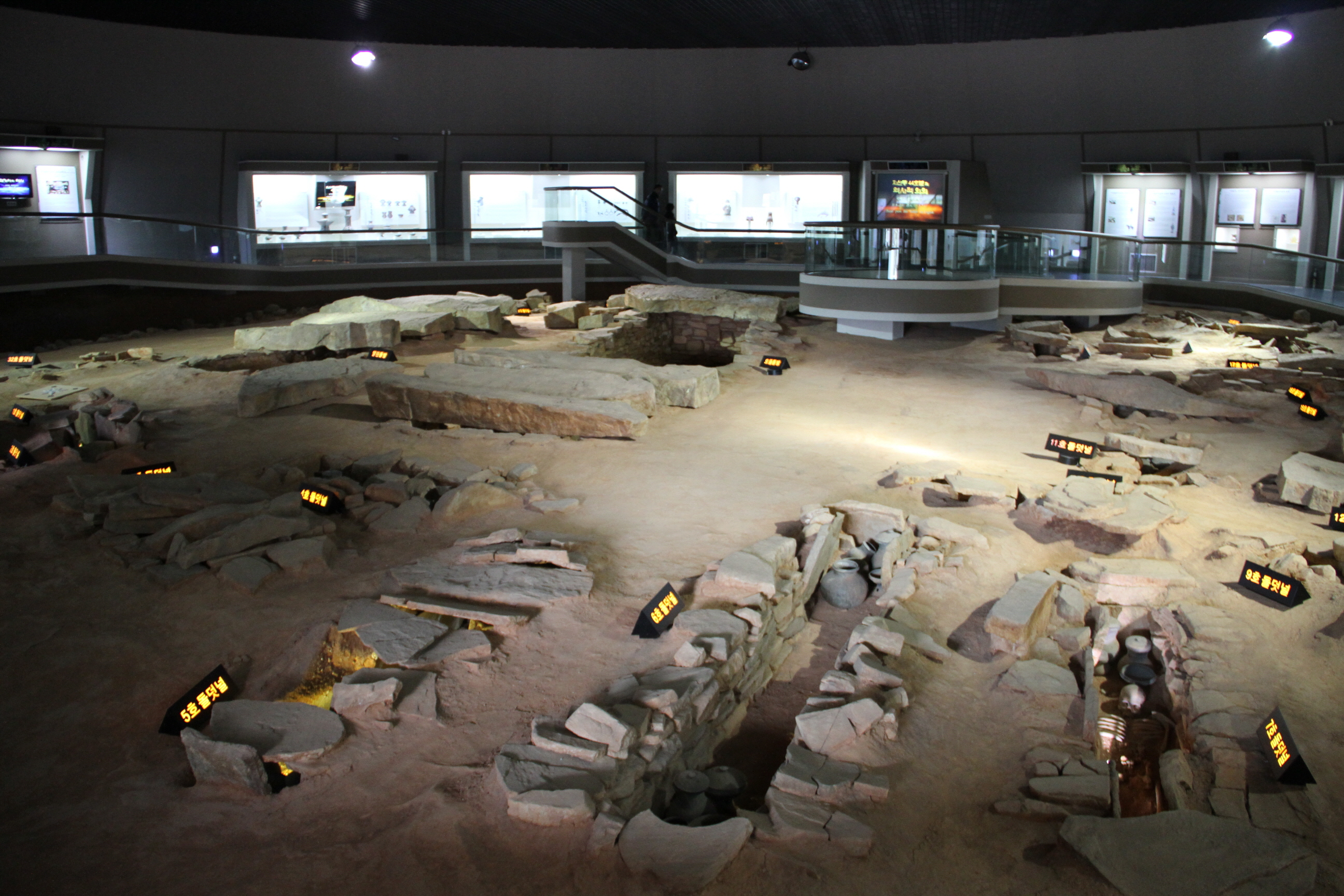
An exhibition of royal tomb of Daegaya. Goryeong, Gyeongsangbuk-do.

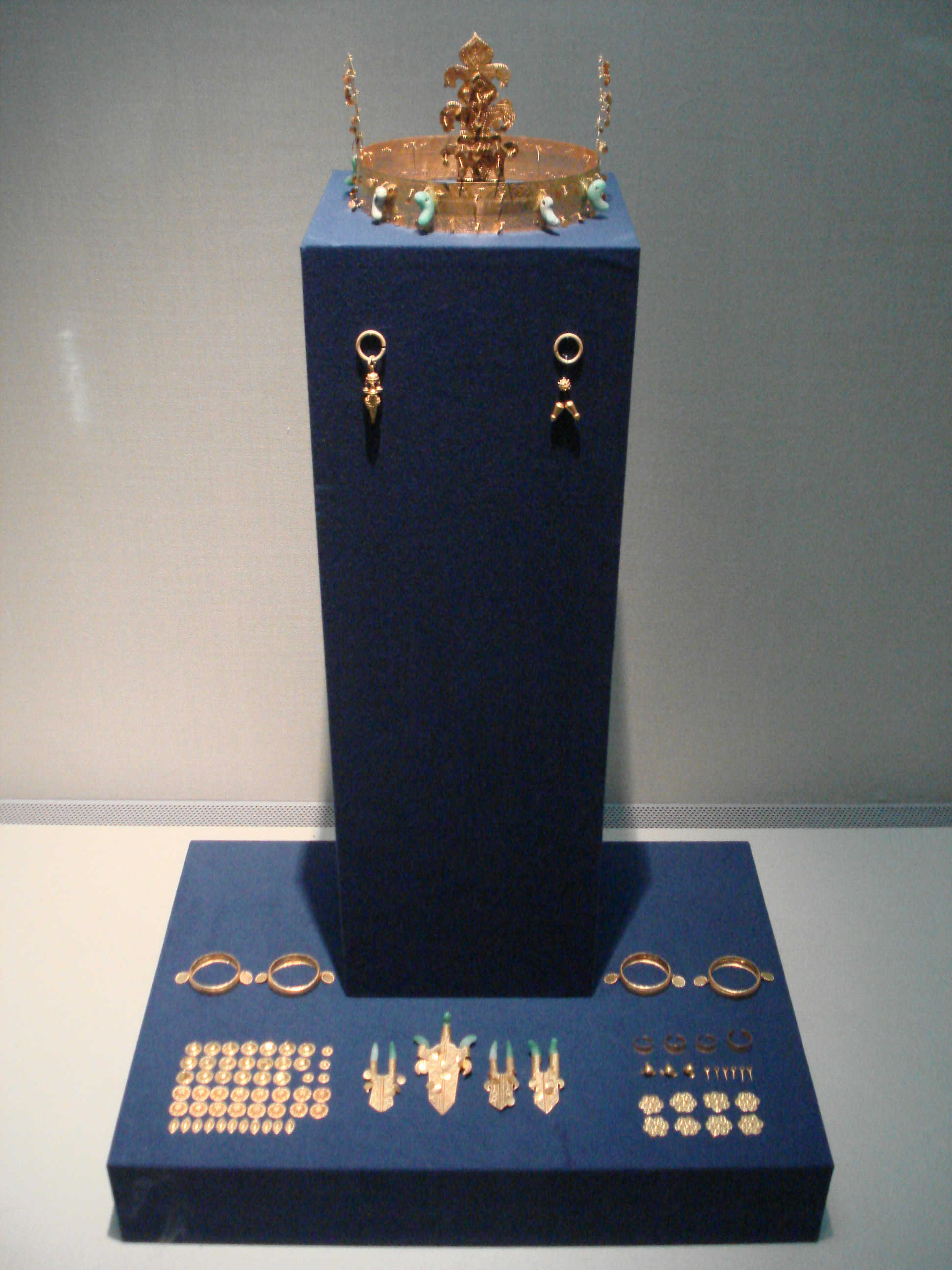
Gold crown and accessories.

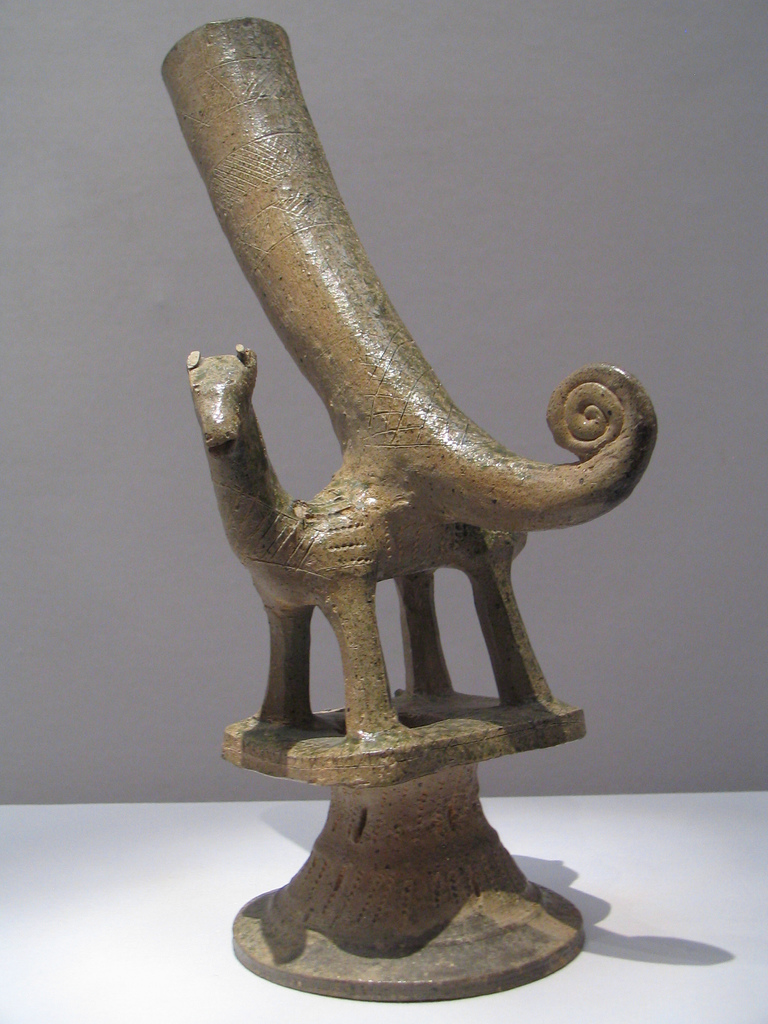
Horn-shaped cup from Kaya that may illustrate connection of Persian culture through the Silk Road to Korea.

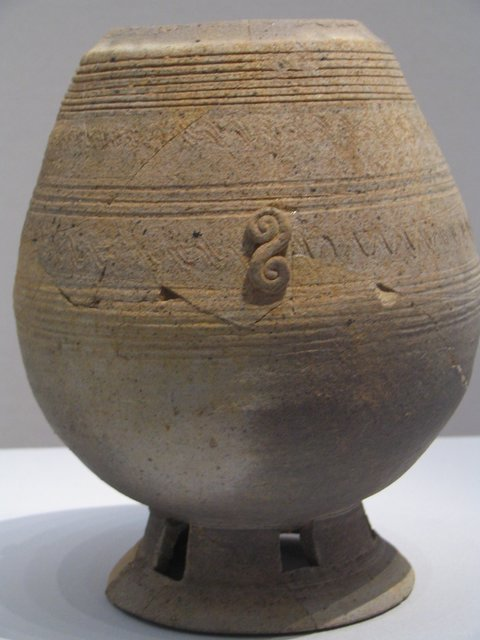
Kaya pottery at the National Museum of Korea.

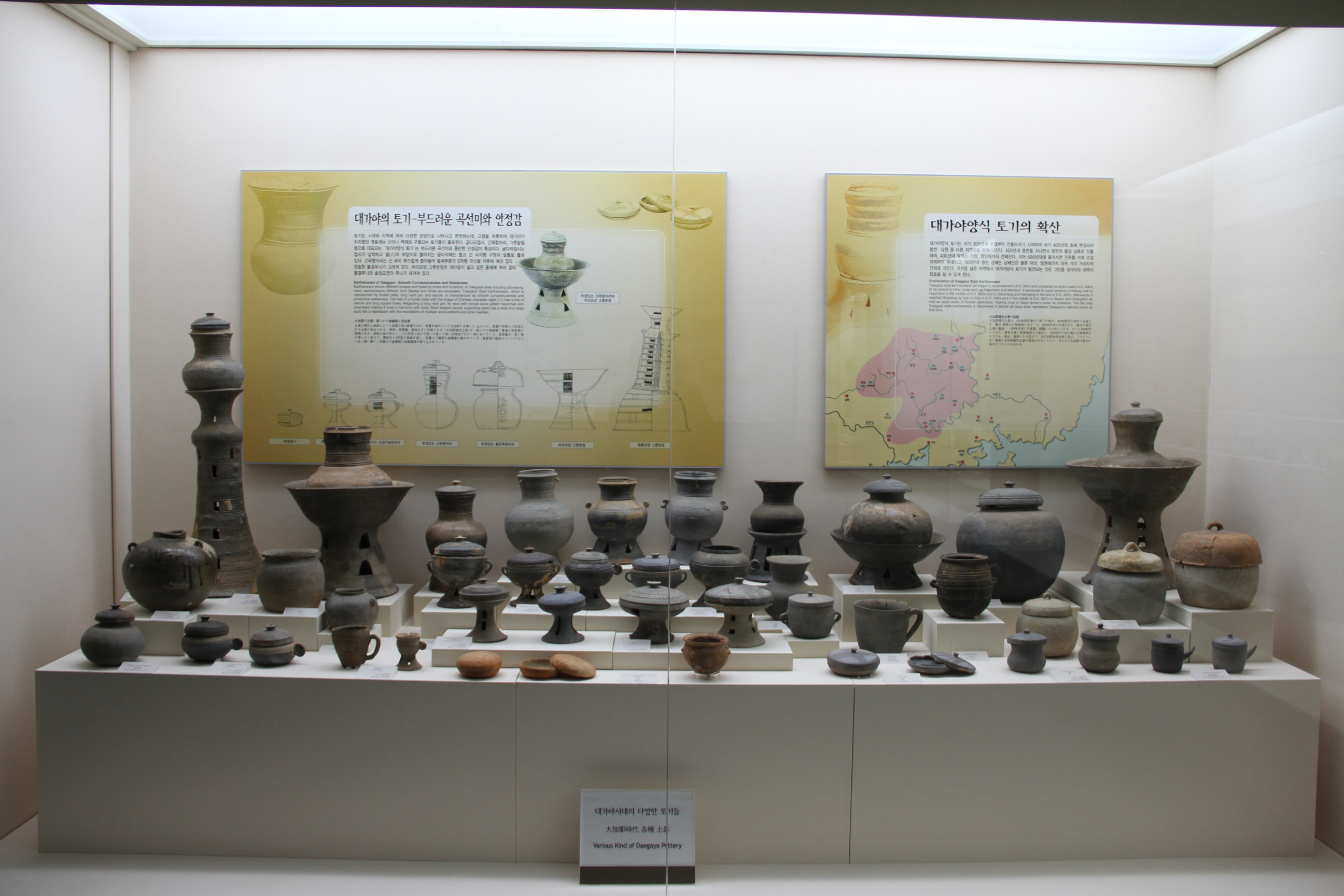
Earthenwares display in Museum of Daegaya.

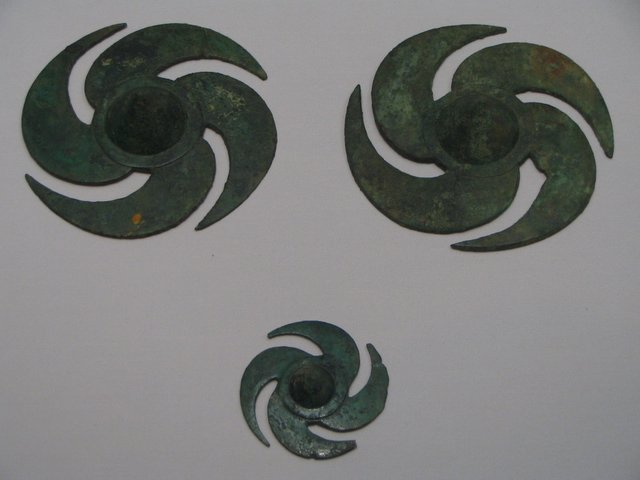
Shield ornaments excavated from the Daeseong-dong cemetery site in Gimhae.

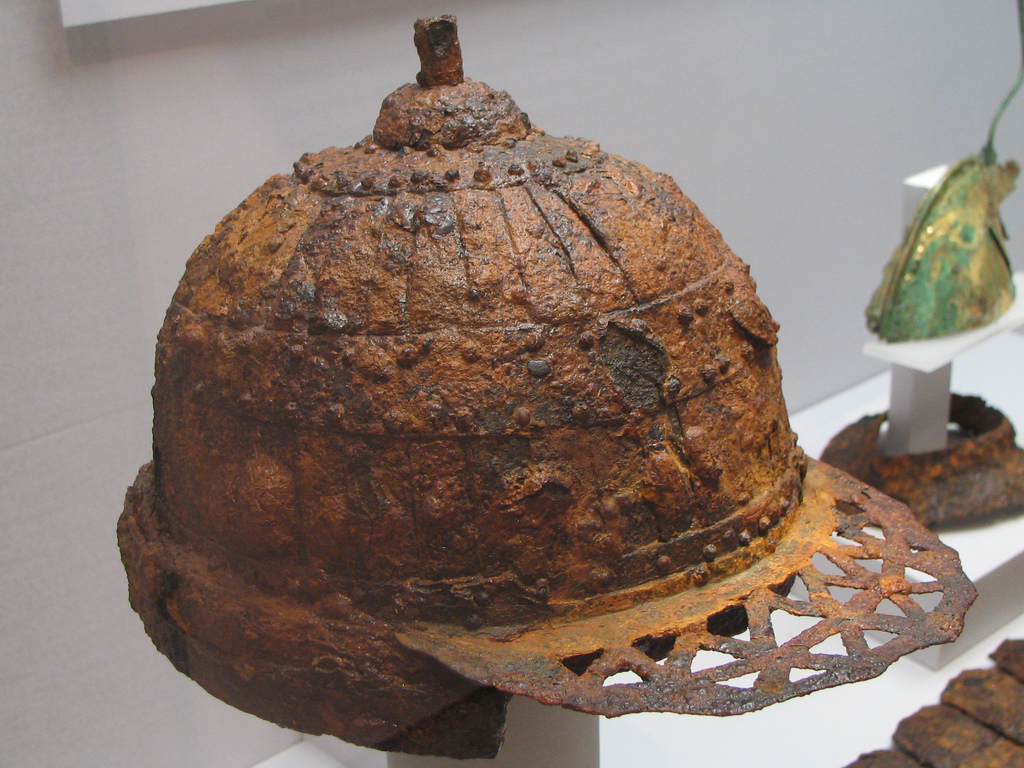
This iron helmet illustrates the skill of iron-working and importance of iron from the Nakdong River valley.

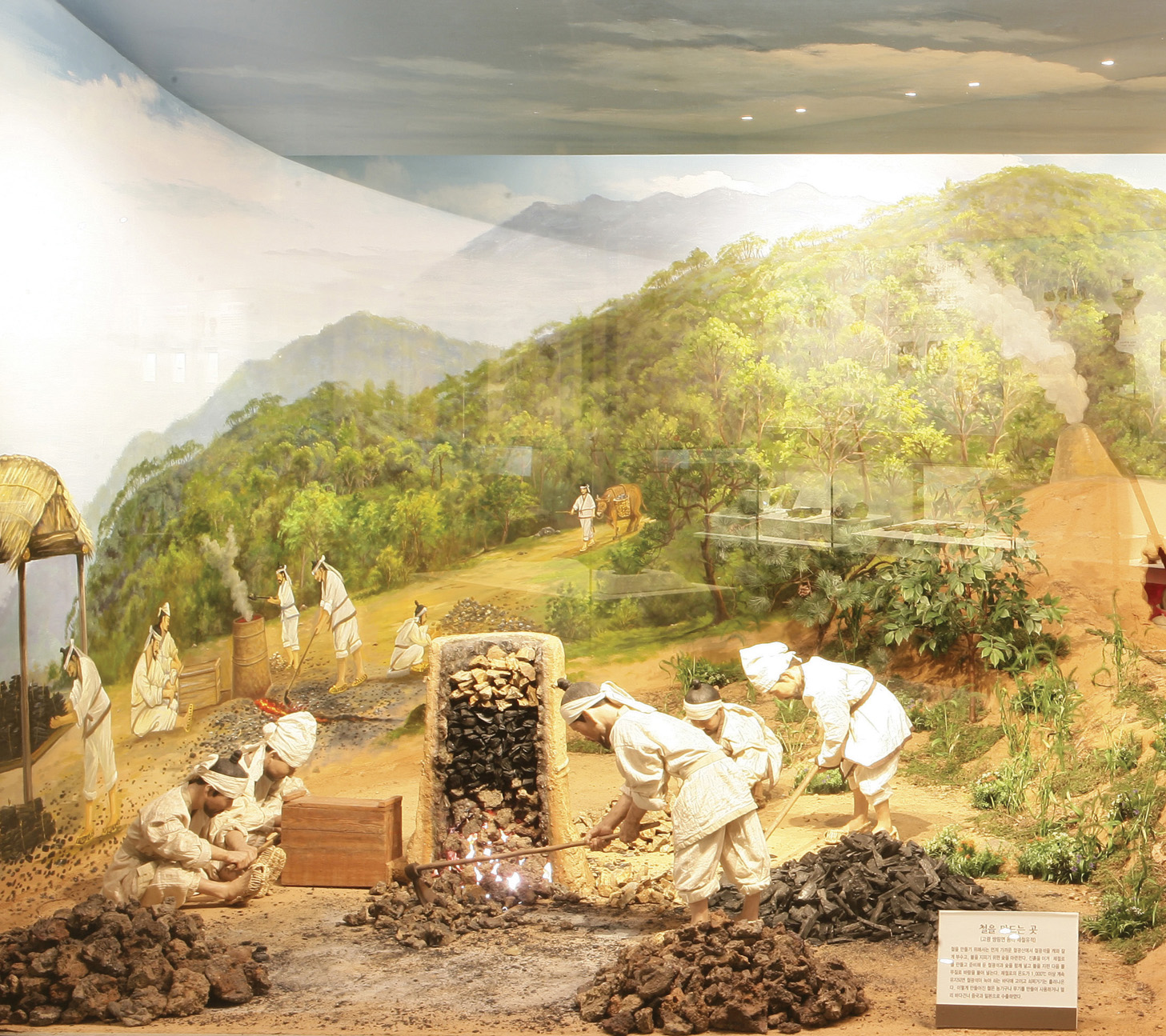
Refinery model of Kaya people.

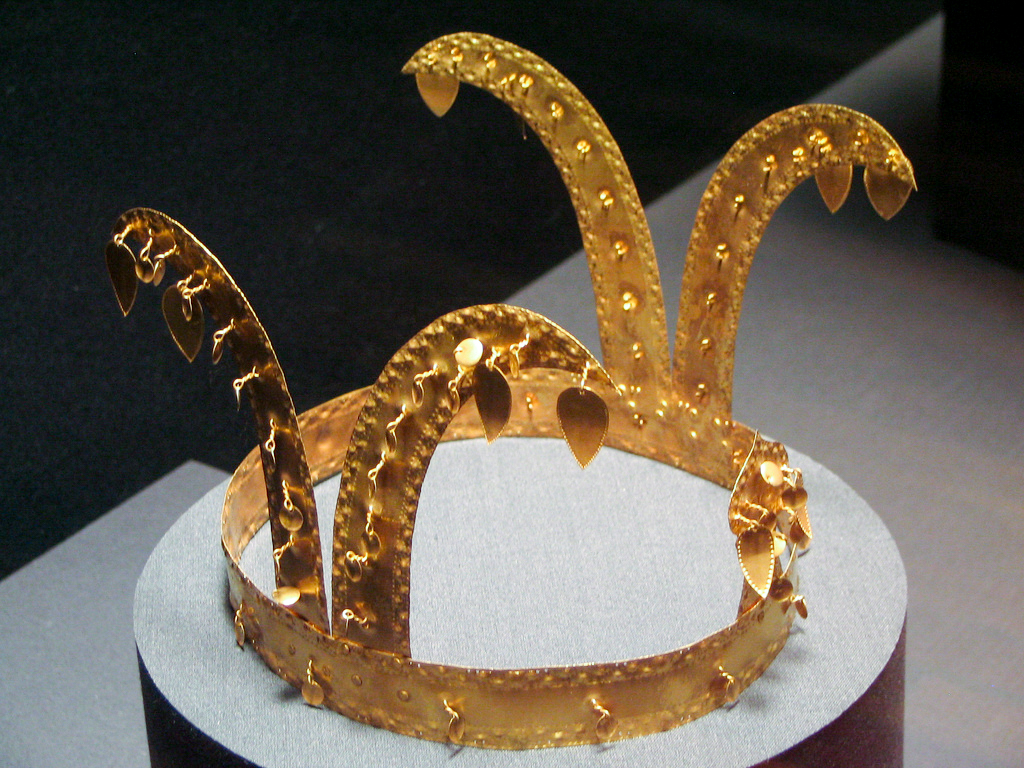
Kaya Crown

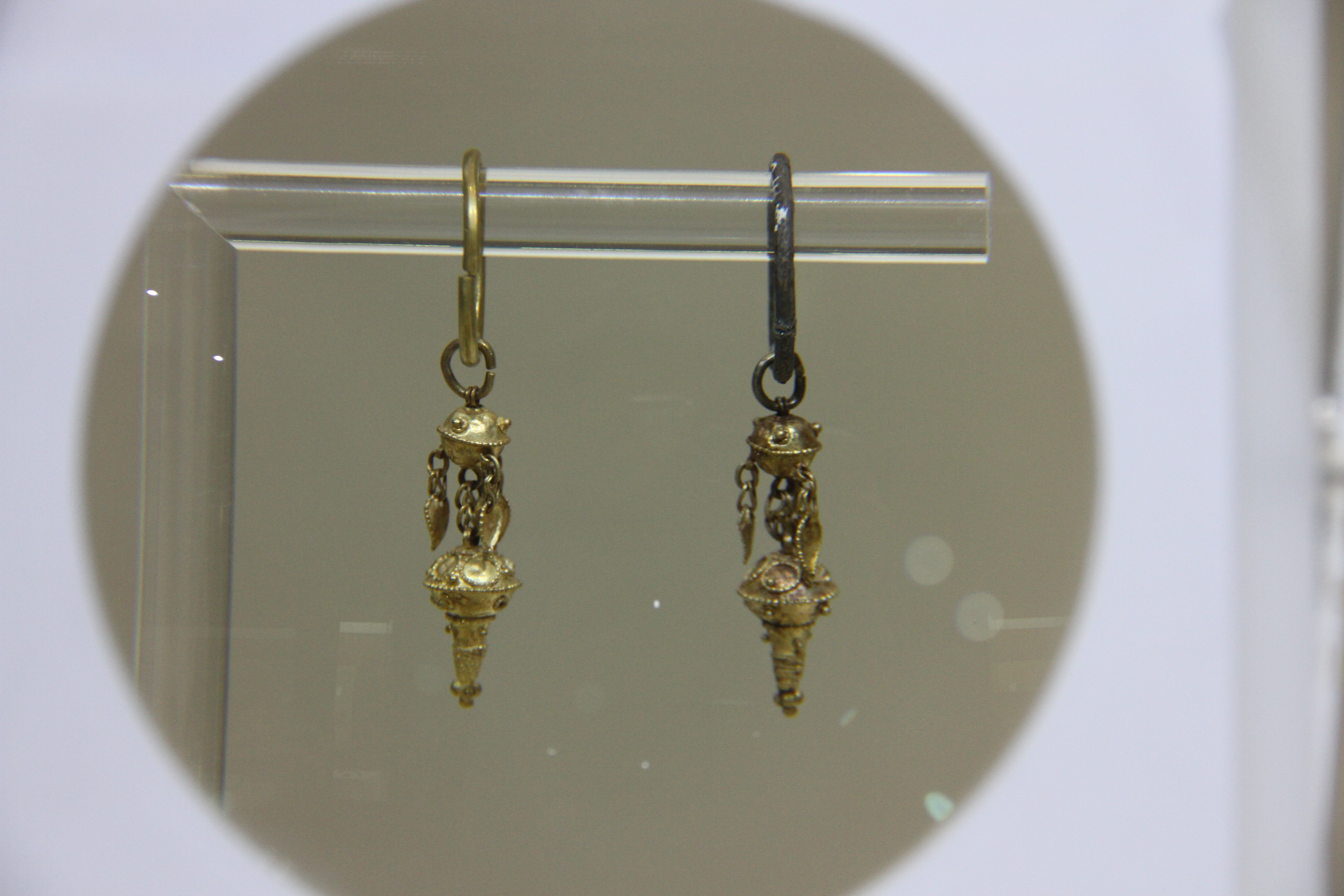
Earrings of Kaya.

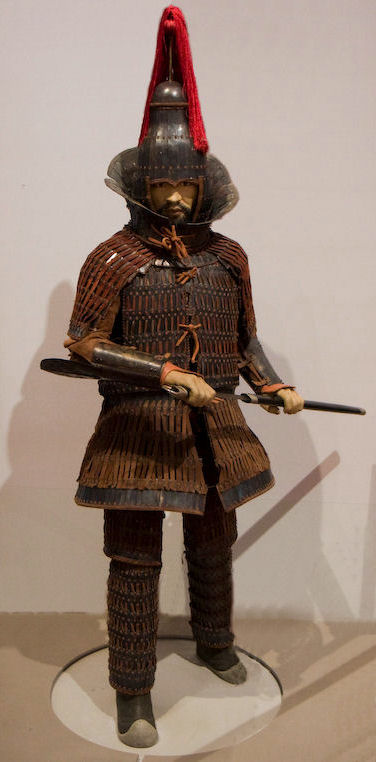
A Kaya soldier (After 412, armor style influenced by Goguryeo.)

== See also ==
- History of Korea
- List of Korean monarchs#Gaya confederacy
- Three Kingdoms of Korea
- Crown of Gaya
- Relations between Gaya and ancient Japan
