= Mimana =

Placename used in Japanese text Nihon Shoki

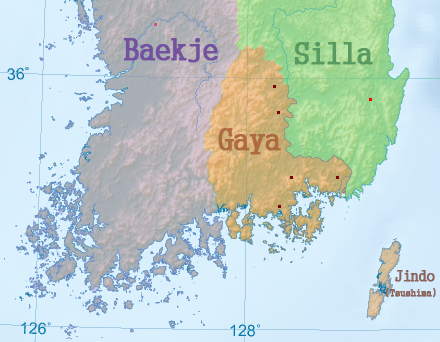
Southern Korea around the time of the Gaya confederacy. This region has been described as the most likely location of Mimana

Mimana (Chinese and Japanese: 任那; pinyin: Rènnà; Korean: 임나), also transliterated as Imna according to the Korean pronunciation, is the name used primarily in the 8th-century Japanese text Nihon Shoki, likely referring to one of the Korean states of the time of the Gaya confederacy (c. 1st–5th centuries). As Atkins notes, "The location, expanse, and Japaneseness of Imna/Mimana remain among the most disputed issues in East Asian historiography." Seth notes that the very existence of Mimana is still disputed. However, the hypothesis that Mimana or "Mimana Nihonfu" (任那日本府) was a Japanese colonial ruling institution of Koreans is denied by historical academia in both Korea and Japan.

== Usage of term ==
The name 任那 (pronounced Mimana in Japanese, Imna in Korean, and Renna in Mandarin Chinese) is used over 200 times in the 8th-century Japanese text Nihongi. Much earlier, it is mentioned in a 5th-century Chinese history text, the Book of Song, in the chapter on the State of Wa. It is also used in two Korean epigraphic relics, as well as in several Korean texts, including Samguk sagi. The oldest reference to Imna occurs on the last portion of Gwanggaeto Stele erected in AD 414 by Jangsu of Goguryeo; during the Silla–Goguryeo and Paekche–Kaya–Wa War, in order to rescue Silla from the Paekche–Kaya–Wa invaders, Goguryeo troops pursued Wakoku forces to a city in Imna, where the Wa forces surrendered. Because of the connotations of Wa presence on the Korean peninsula, Korean Academics began disputing the very existence of Imna starting in 1970s. However, the very term "Imna" occurs over 100 times in Korea's oldest history book, Samguk sagi.

== Hypotheses on meaning ==
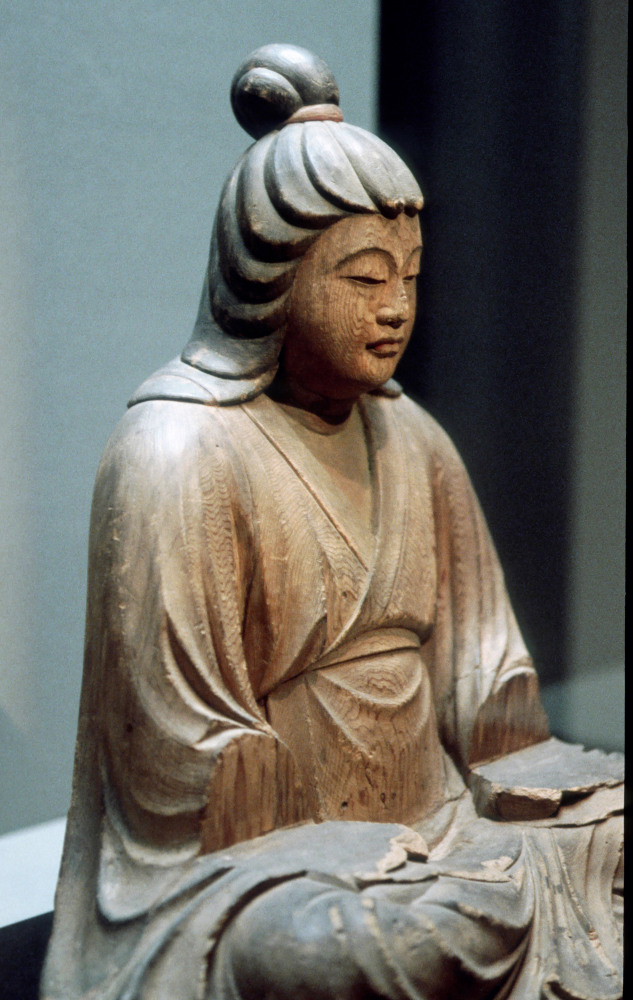
Japanese Empress Jingū, who, according to legend, conquered a "promised land" that is sometimes interpreted as territories on the Korean Peninsula and who founded Mimana

The first serious hypothesis on the meaning of Mimana comes from Japanese scholars. Based on their interpretation of Nihongi, they claimed that Mimana was a Japanese-controlled state on the Korean Peninsula that had existed from the time of the legendary Empress Jingū's conquest in the 3rd century to Gaya's defeat and annexation by Silla in the 6th century. That was part of the Japanese imagery for centuries, envisioning Japanese supremacy and cultural superiority over Korea's Sadae policy centered on China, and it was also one of the grounds for portraying the 20th-century Japanese occupation of Korea as a Japanese return to lands that they had once controlled. That early Japanese view has also been often reproduced in old Western works. One of the main proponents of the theory was the Japanese scholar Suematsu Yasukazu, who proposed in 1949 that Mimana was a Japanese colony on the Korean Peninsula that existed from the 3rd to the 6th centuries. The theory has lost popularity since the 1970s, largely because of the complete lack of archeological evidence that such a settlement would have produced, the fact that a centralized Japanese state with power projection capability did not exist at that time (the Yayoi period), and the more likely possibility that Nihongi is describing (or misinterpreting, intentionally or not) an event that had occurred centuries before its composition in which Jingū's conquest is a dramatized and politicized version of her immigration to the Japanese archipelago, which would have been one of many during the Yayoi period (Hanihara Kazurō has suggested that the annual immigrant influx to the Japanese Archipelago from the Asian mainland during the Yayoi period ranged from 350 to 3,000). In 2010, a joint study group of historians sponsored by the governments of Japan and South Korea agreed that Gaya had never been militarily colonized by ancient Japan.

The old Japanese interpretation has been disputed by Korean scholars. At first, they simply chose to ignore it, but more recently, their position has been bolstered as continuing archeological excavations on the Korean Peninsula have failed to produce any evidence supporting the hypothesis. Korean historians generally interpret the claim about a Japanese colony in Korea as nationalistic colonial historiography, which has been accepted by some historians. Korean scholar Chun-Gil Kim, in his 2005 book The History of Korea, discusses the topic under the section "The Mimana Fallacy."

Rurarz describes five main theories on Mimana, the first of which was proposed by Suematsu. A second theory on Mimana was proposed by the North Korean scholar Gim Seokhyeong, who suggested that Mimana was a political entity from the Korean Peninsula (possibly Gaya) that had a colony on the Japanese Islands, somewhere around the modern-day city of Ōyama, Ōita in Ōita Prefecture; thus Nihongi should be understood as referring only to the Japanese Islands and Jingū's conquest a description of a migration to a land in the Japanese Archipelago, not the Korean Peninsula. That is related to the so-called horserider invasion theory in which horse riders from the Korean Peninsula are hypothesized to have successfully invaded Japan and to have introduced horses, not native to the islands, to Japan. A third theory has been proposed by the Japanese scholar Inoue Hideo, who argued that ancient Japanese Wa people might have settled a region in the Korean Peninsula as long ago as around the Neolithic and that the Mimana state was an enclave of that group. A fourth theory was put forward by the South Korean scholar Cheon Gwan-u, who argued that the events present a history of the Korean Baekje state, which was allied with Yamato Japan and whose leaders fled there after Baekje's fall in the 7th century. In that version, Mimana would refer to Baekje, or some poorly-understood fragment of that state, which fought against Gaya. The fifth theory, which Rurarz describes as a "compromise version of recent young Japanese and Korean scholars" argues that there never was a Mimana state as such, and the term refers to Japanese diplomatic envoys active in the Korean Peninsula in that era.

According to Han Yong-u, Yamato Japan could have established an office in Gaya to export iron to Japan. That theory suggests Mimana to have been a diplomatic embassy and Jingū's conquest as a dramatization of efforts undertaken to establish that embassy.

The topic of Mimana, such as its portrayal in Japanese textbooks, is still one of the controversies affecting Japanese-Korean relations.

== Linguistics ==
According to several linguists, including Alexander Vovin and Juha Janhunen, Japonic languages were spoken in large parts of the southern Korean Peninsula. Vovin suggests that these "Peninsular Japonic languages" (now extinct), while initially co-existing with Koreanic languages from the north when speakers of these languages arrived in the southern Korean Peninsula, were eventually supplanted or replaced by the Koreanic languages with assimilation over time. Janhunen also suggests that early Baekje may have been predominantly Japonic-speaking before Peninsular Japonic was supplanted by Koreanic. This would suggest that, rather than the Japonic speakers crossing the sea from the Japanese Archipelago to occupy a part of the southern Korean Peninsula, the existing Peninsular Japonic speakers were expelled or assimilated by Koreanic speakers from the north.

== Bibliography ==
- Joanna Rurarz (2009). Historia Korei. Dialog. ISBN 978-83-89899-28-6.
