= Ara Gaya =

1st–6th century Koreanic city state

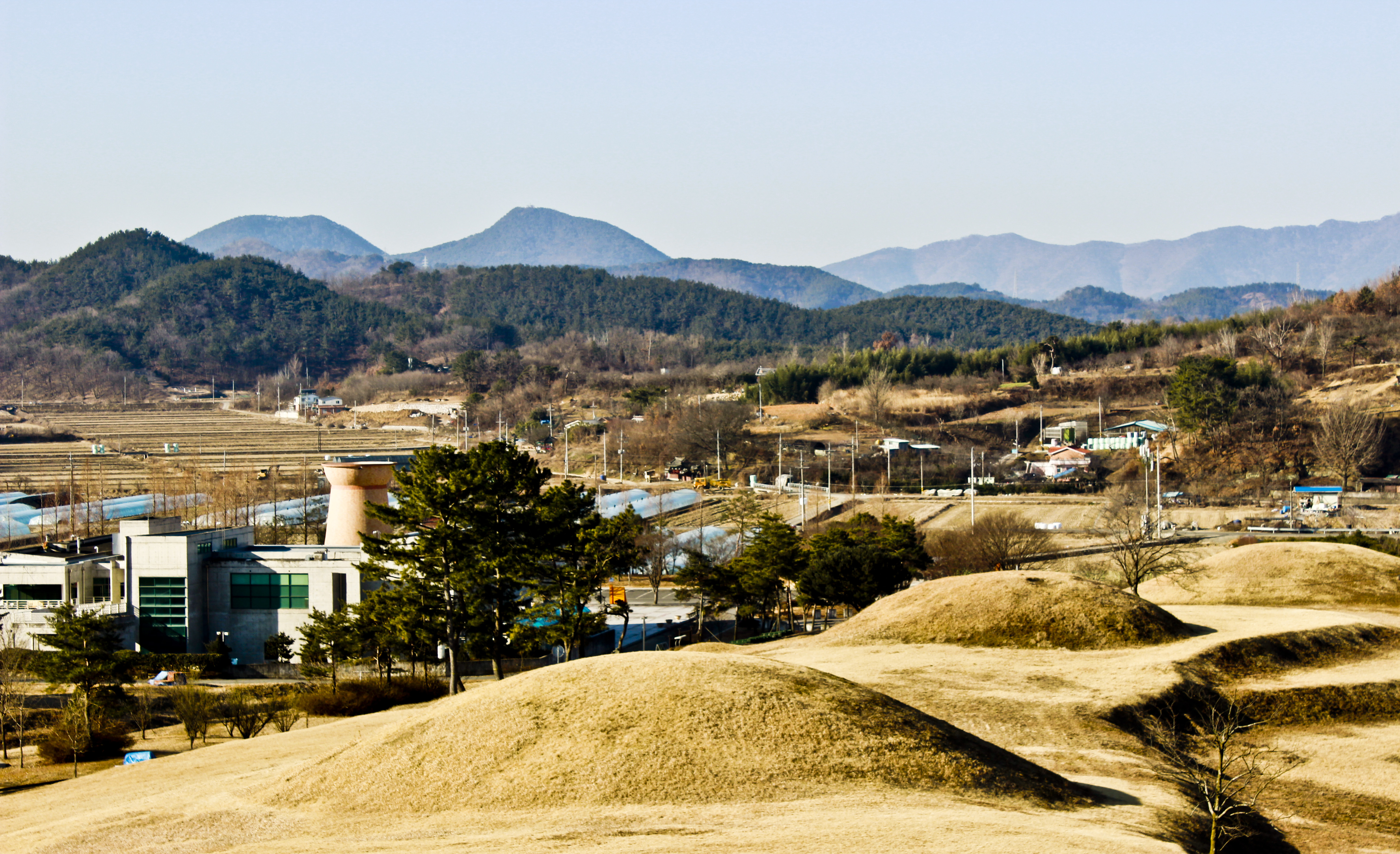
- Ancient Tombs in Haman Marisan, the tombs of the ruling class in Ara Gaya

Korean name
- Hangul: 아라가야
- Hanja: 阿羅伽倻
- RR: Ara Gaya
- MR: Ara Kaya

Alternate name
- Hangul: 안라; 안야/아야; 아시량국
- Hanja: 安羅; 安邪; 阿尸良國
- RR: Alla; Anya/Aya; Asiryangguk
- MR: Alla; Anya/Aya; Asiryangguk

Ara Gaya (Korean: 아라가야; Hanja: 阿羅伽倻), also known as Ana Gaya, Anra/Alla (안라; 安羅), Anya/Aya (안야/아야; 安邪), or Asiryangguk (아시량국; 阿尸良國), was a city-state kingdom in the part of Gaya confederacy, in modern-day Haman County of South Korea in the 6th century.

== History ==
As the confrontational foreign policy of Daegaya failed, Ara Gaya and its less confrontational policy gained support in the 540s AD.

By the 6th century AD, Gaya could not risk the hostility of either Baekje or Silla (two of the Three Kingdoms of Korea that dominated the peninsula, the third being Goguryeo). Ara Gaya put a great deal of effort into pursuing a diplomatic solution for maintaining its independence, including hosting summits between Baekje, Silla and Yamato-Wa.

The Gaya confederacy was greatly weakened at the time, as northwestern Gaya states fell under the influence of Baekje and southeastern states fell under Silla's influence. Ara Gaya sought to maintain its independence by allying itself with Goguryeo, and then asked Goguryeo to invade Baekje in 548 AD. This attempt to weaken Baekje's sphere of influence failed when Goguryeo failed to succeed in the campaign.

In 553 AD, Silla defeated Baekje in war and occupied the Gyeonggi area (the Han River basin), breaking its 120-year alliance with Baekje. Silla, having started incorporating the parts of Gaya already under its sphere of influence, also invaded the rest of Gaya to eliminate Baekje's sphere of influence there. Ara Gaya capitulated to Silla in 559 AD.

According to the Records of the Three Kingdoms, It is presumed the four countries, Sinunsin (臣雲遣支報), Anra (安邪踧支濆), Sinbunhwal (臣離兒不例) and Geumgwan (拘邪秦支廉), have superior position in southern peninsula around the 3rd century.

Archaeologically confirmed remains include Ancient Tombs in Haman Marisan. its turned out to be the tombs of the ruling class of Ara gaya.

In addition, immigrants known as the Yamato no Aya clan from Ara Gaya arrived in Japan as Toraijins in the Kofun period.

== Alla Conference ==
Alla Conference (安羅會議) was held in 529, with following 1st Sabi Conference (541) and 2nd Sabi Conference (544).

== See also ==
- History of Korea
