= Mahan language =

Presumed language of the ancient Mahan confederency

Mahan
- Han-Paekche, Old Paekche, Japanese Paekche, Aristocratic Paekche, Mahan Paekche
- Native to: Mahan confederacy
- Region: Korea
- Era: 1st century BC to 7th century AD
- Language family: Koreanic?/Japonic?: Han; Mahan

Language codes
- ISO 639-3: None (mis)
- Glottolog: None
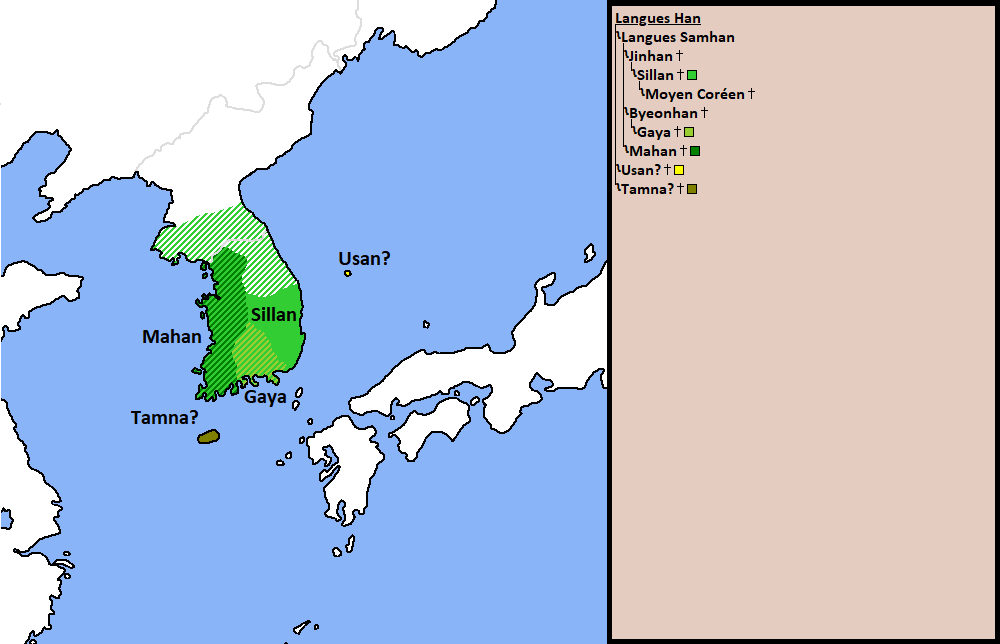
- Map of the Han languages, including Mahan. Mahan Gaya Sillan Tamna Usan

Mahan is the presumed ancient language of the Mahan confederacy in southern Korea. It is virtually unattested.

== Denomination ==
This language can be referred to as Mahan, Han-Paekche, Old Paekche, Japanese Paekche or Aristocratic Paekche.

Some believe that the Mahan can be subdivided into two periods:

- Mahan (literal): From the 1st to 4th centuries AD;
- Mahan Paekche: From the 4th to 7th centuries AD

Ki-Moon Lee assumes that this is just Baekje with a substrate of Buyeo language. This is different to Martine Robbeets, who believes that Mahan Paekche is separate from the Baekje and Buyeo language.

== Classification ==
From Chinese texts, Lee and Ramsey separate the languages of the Dong Yi into three groups:

- The Suksin languages (or Suksinic): Suksin, Umnu, Mulgil and Malgal. They perhaps could have been Tungusic
- The Puyŏ languages: Buyeo, Goguryeo, Okjeo and Ye-Maek;
- The Han languages: Chinhan (became Silla), Byeonhan (became Gaya), Mahan (became Baekje).

They consider the Puyŏ languages and Han languages as a part of the same family.

However, this language connection is not accepted by everyone. Furthermore, some consider it a Koreanic language, while others believe it is a Peninsular Japonic language.

Alexander Vovin notes that the Japonic-origin toponyms of Samguk Sagi are mainly concentrated in the Han River basin's region, formerly part of Baekje and later annexed by Goguryeo. Furthermore, he finds that Mahan is very similar to pseudo-Goguryeo, so he concludes that such a differentiation may be artificial.

Soo-Hee Toh, while taking toponyms into account, hypothesizes that Mahan, Ye-Maek and Gaya were the same language.

== Lexical comparison ==
Vovin, who supports a Japonic origin for Mahan, compares words from this language to words from islander Japonic.

Comparaison of Insular Japonic with Mahan
English	French	Old Japanese	Proto-Ryūkyū	Insular Proto-Japonic	Mahan
fortress	forteresse	kömë- 'to lock up'	*kume-	*kɘmay- 'lock up'	*kuma
establishment	établissement	*ya-marö 'subdivision'	--	*ya-maro	*yamru

== See also ==
- Gaya confederacy
- Silla
