= Samhan people =

Ancestors of the Koreans

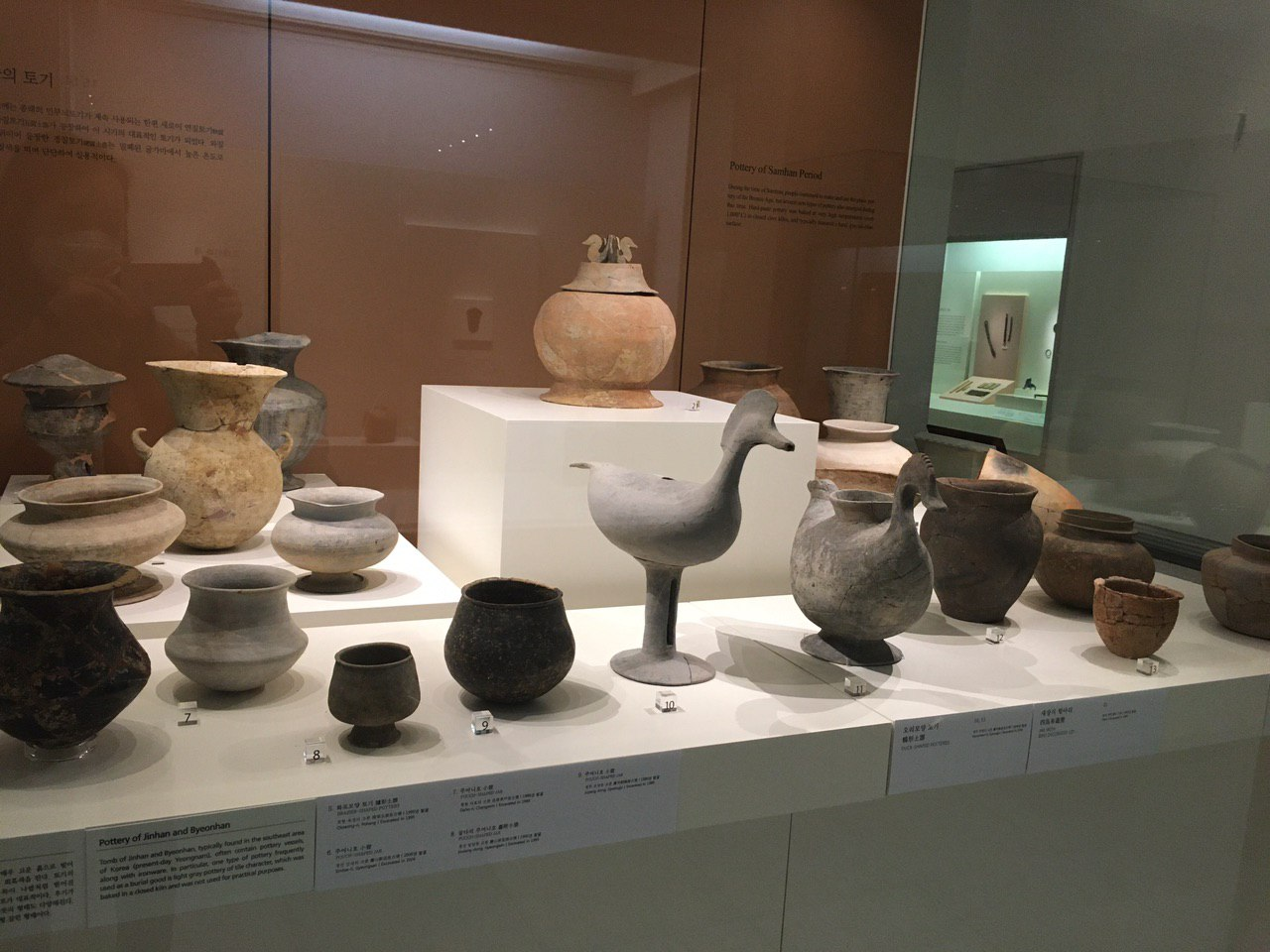
- Pottery of the Samhan people

Korean name
- Hangul: 삼한인
- Hanja: 三韓人
- RR: Samhanin
- MR: Samhanin

The Samhan people also known as the Three Hans people (Korean: 삼한인; Hanja: 三韓人) were an ancient group of ethnic Koreans who resided in the southern part of Korea. Alongside the Yemaek people, they are believed to be the major contributors of modern day Koreans' genetics as well as culture, and language.

== Overview ==
The name "Samhan" derives from the concept of the same name, where it posits that the ancient Koreans in the south were under one "Han" identity, but were separated by political differences. The Samhan people were the main inhabitants of what is known as the Proto–Three Kingdoms period of Korea.

It is unclear when the Samhan people first entered the peninsula, however, based on archaeological evidence, they are believed to be the result of the assimilation between the Jeulmun and Mumun pottery period settlers who arrived from 8000–300BCE.

Samhan polities

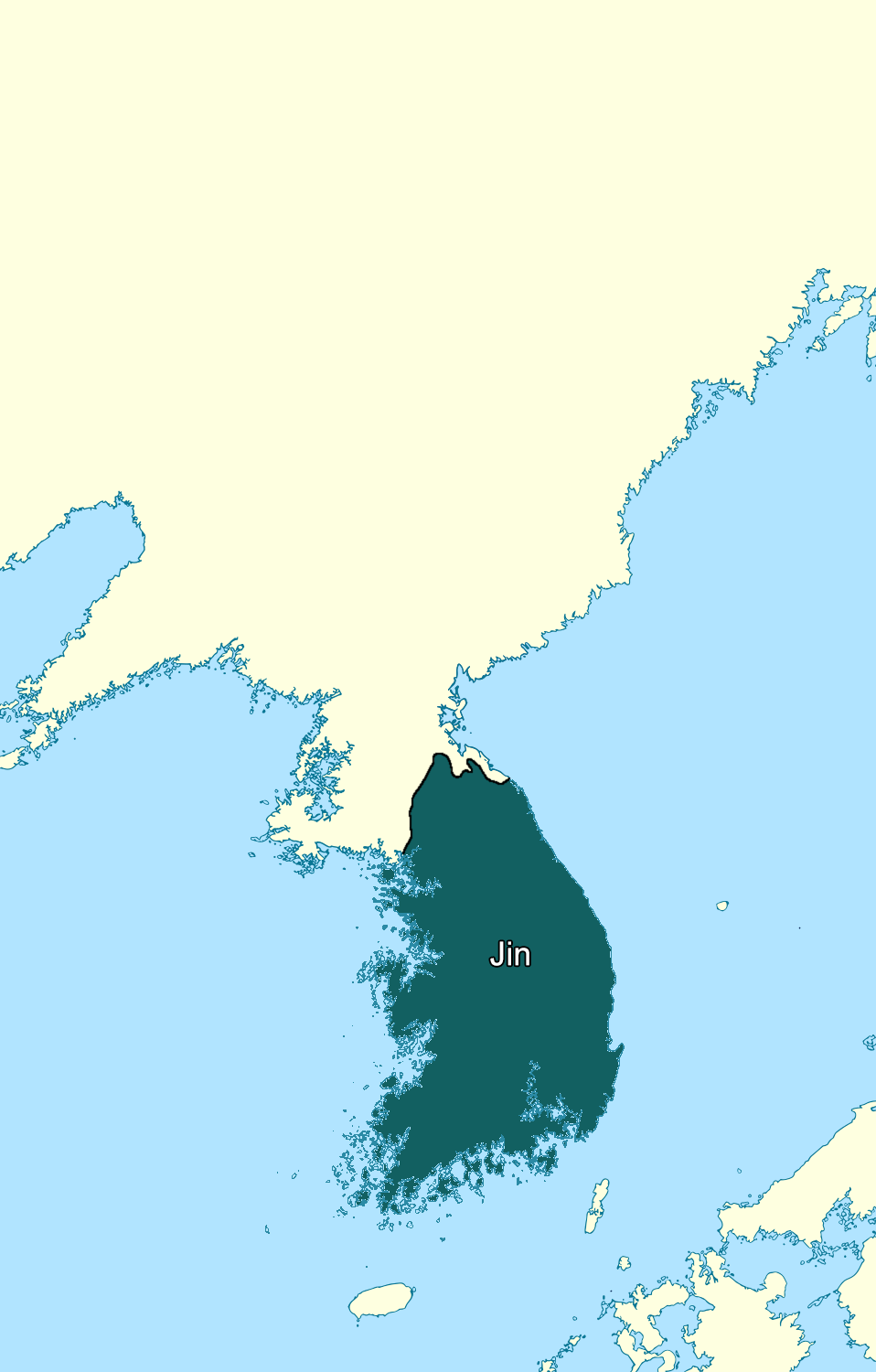
State of Jin in c. 2nd century BCE

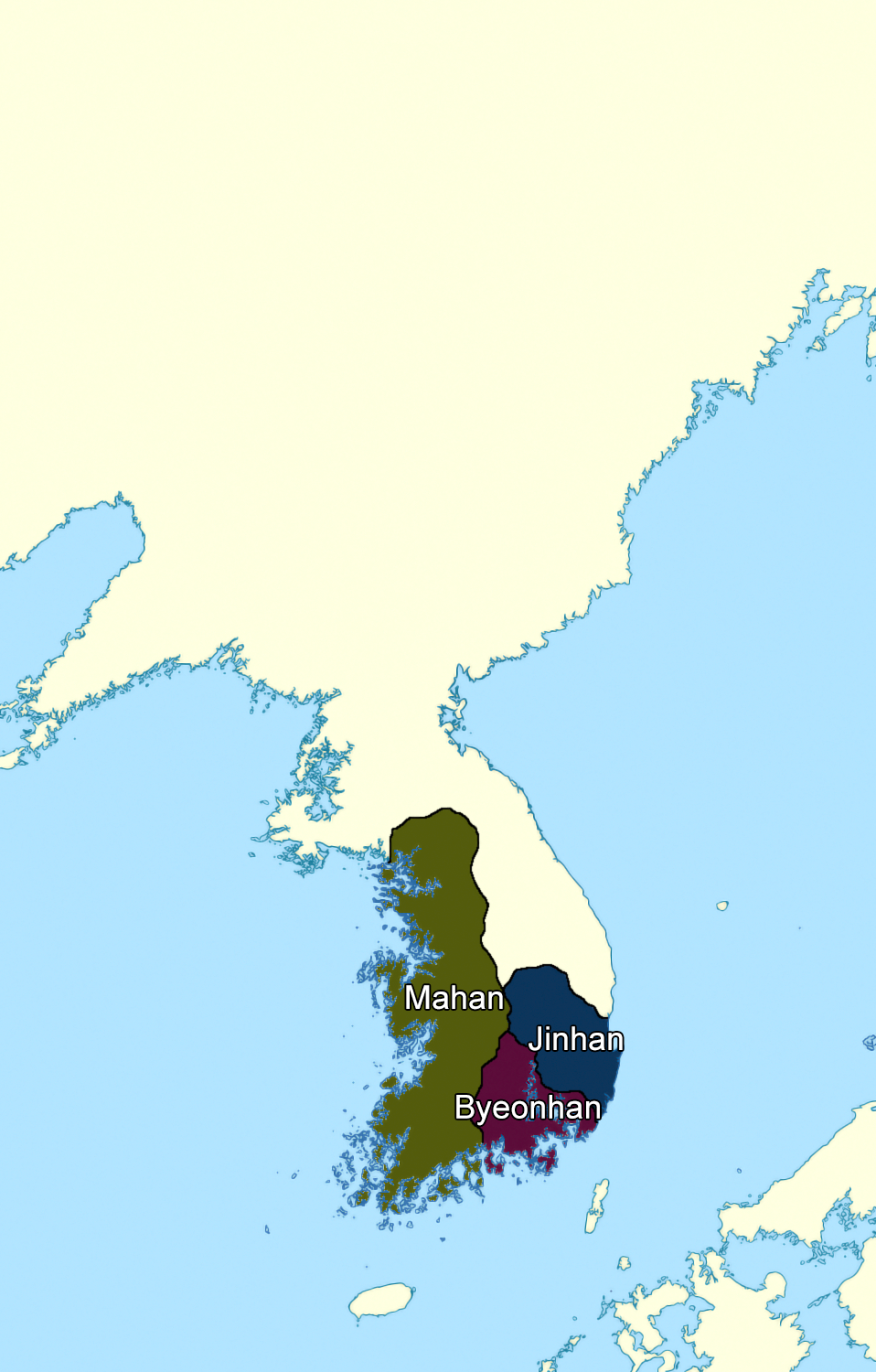
Samhan confederacies: Mahan, Byeonhan, and Jinhan in c. 2nd century BCE

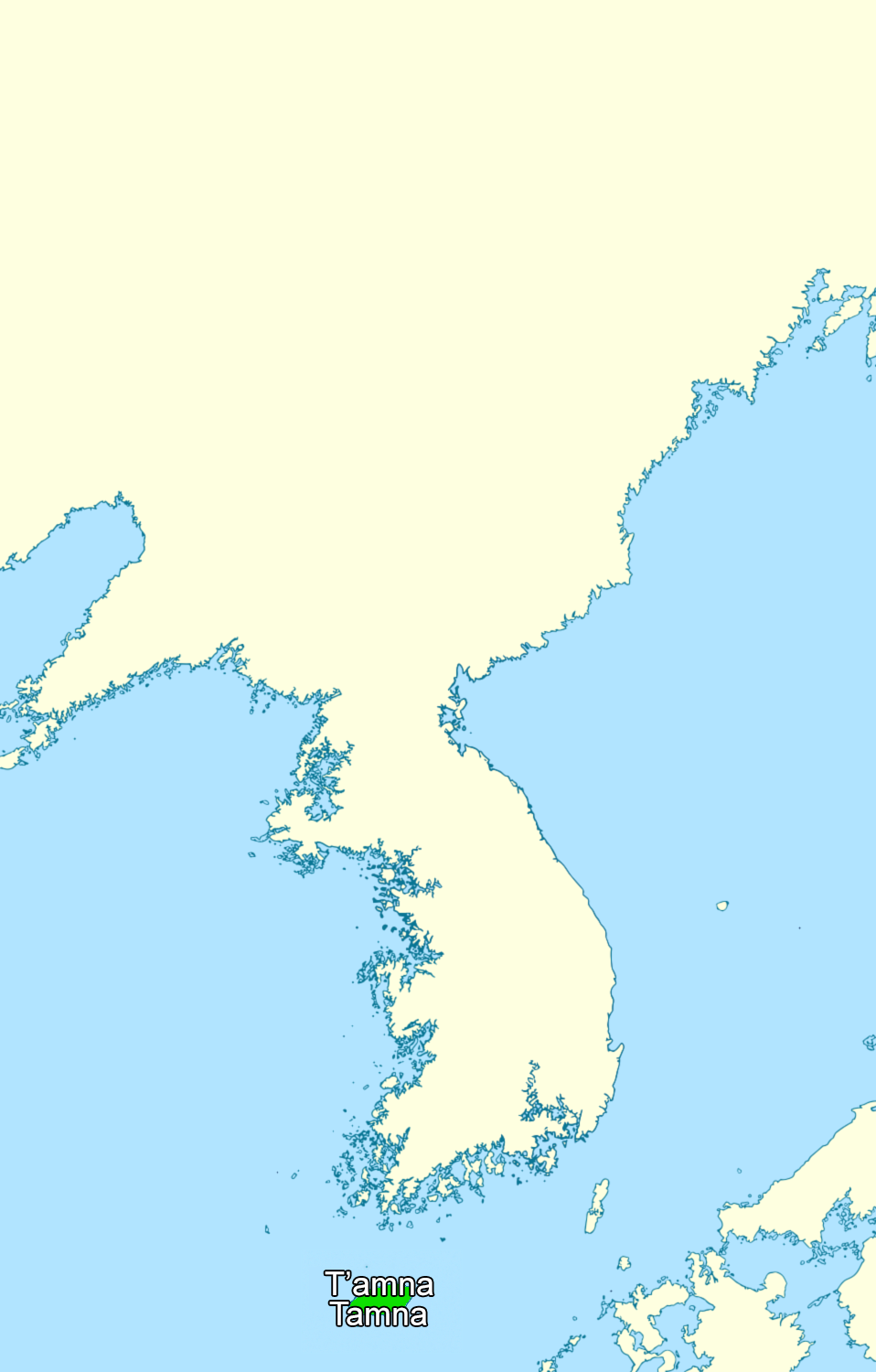
Tamna of Jeju Island

The first Samhan polity to be mentioned was the Jin state, an ancient polity that co-existed with Yemaek-related kingdoms of Old Chosŏn, and Buyeo up north. Though the resources are scarce, it is believed that the state of Jin wanted to trade with the Chinese for their metal culture, but Wiman Chosŏn (the contemporary dynasty of Old Chosŏn) prevented it. After the fall of Jin came three separate, but related polities: Mahan confederacy, Byeonhan confederacy, and Jinhan confederacy. The three new confederacies all claimed successorship of the previous Jin state, and were collectively called the "Three Hans" or "Samhan".

『家爲看烟南蘇城一家爲國烟新來註韓穢[...]』

"The newly seized era names of Han and Ye are as follows[...]"

— Gwanggaeto Stele

According to the inscription found on the Gwanggaeto Stele, it is believed that the kingdom of Goguryeo differentiated the Han (Samhan) from the Ye (Yemaek) as different cultures. However, the stele mentions that Gwanggaeto the Great, afraid of his people (written as "Kumin; 구민; 舊民" or "indigenous people") dying out, ordered specifically the Han and Ye people to learn the practice of Goguryeo burial traditions, signifying that the two groups were compatible.

Tamna of Jeju Island is also often associated with the Samhan people as it is believed that the kingdom was distinct from the northern counterpart and were closer both linguistically, genetically, and culturally to the contemporary Samhan polities.

== Culture ==
Many of the archeological evidence found in the area lack distinguishable differences with the evidence found in the neighboring kingdoms, suggesting that the cultures were mostly similar across the southern part of the peninsula. Little is known about the daily lives of the Samhan people. The religion appears to have been shamanistic which played an important role in politics as well. Agriculture was heavily dominated by rice, but also included substantial rearing of livestock including horses, cattle, and chickens.

The inhabitants of the southern peninsula are said to have been specialized in weaving and silk production, however, unlike its neighbors, the Samhan people took interest in beads (likely related to gogok) and decorated them on their clothes as well as wearing them as necklaces and earrings.

『弁辰與辰韓雜居，城郭衣服皆同，言語風俗有異。其人形皆長大，美髮，衣服絜清。而刑法嚴峻。其國近倭，故頗有文身者。』

"Byeonhan and Jinhan people live together with their clothes within the cities being the same. However, their customs and languages differ. They are tall, have beautiful hair, and wear neat clothes. They are also strict on laws. They are close to Wa (Japan) and they all have tattoos."

— Book of the Later Han

『今辰韓人皆褊頭，男女近倭，亦文身。便步戰，兵仗與馬韓同。』

"People of Jinhan have small heads, both men and women have tattoos on their bodies, similar to the people of Wa. They also fight on foot similar to the soldiers of Mahan."

— Book of Wei, Volume 30

Outside of Korea, the Chinese recorded the Samhan people to be quite similar, emphasizing on their strict laws and pleasing looks. They were also described to be similar to the people of Wa (Japan) due to having tattoos on their bodies (most likely directing at the Yayoi people).

In places like the Jinhan confederacy, infants were made flat headed by pushing their skulls onto a flat rock. This practice is thought to have lasted up to the Kaya confederacy.

Pottery from the Samhan period is primarily found in the South Gyeongsang Province. It possesses unique forms and colors that distinguish it from the Jungdo-style pottery of the central Korean Peninsula and the pottery of the northern regions. Similar to the red burnished pottery discovered in Jinju during the Bronze Age, this suggests that a power producing pottery distinct from the Misongri-style pottery of Old Chosŏn had settled in the southern Korean Peninsula and on Jeju Island. Subsequently, Samhan pottery continued to develop as the central axis of ceramics, leading to the exquisite footed-style pottery of Kaya and the pottery style of Silla.

== Language ==
Ancient accounts such as China's Book of the Later Han state that the languages spoken by the Samhan confederacies were different to each other. However, other sources such as the Samguk sagi and Samguk yusa state that the polities were linguistically mutual.

Modern linguists such as Alexander Vovin, Ki-Moon Lee, S. Robert Ramsey, Christopher I. Beckwith, and John B. Whitman posited that the language spoken on the Korean peninsula (and on Jeju Island) was not a single system, but had multiple forms that originated from different families. As such, it is believed that the language spoken by the Samhan people was different from the language spoken by the Yemaek, and thus is categorized under Han languages, one of the ancestor languages to the Koreanic language family.

Another theory posits that the southern part of the Korean peninsula, directing at the Samhan people, was inhabited by a group who spoke a language akin to the Japonic languages, suggesting that the Samhan people were related to the ancient Japonic speakers of the Japanese archipelago. It is also believed that the Jeju language show connections with Japonic languages though it is currently disputed. The theory became the precursor to the Peninsular Japonic theory, an idea that proposes that an ancient form of Japanese was spoken in Korea (and Tamna/Jeju), and that it had an impact (whether major or minor) on the modern day Korean language as supported by scholars such as Koji Mizoguchi, and Kazuo Miyamoto. However, detractors argue that the language spoken by the Samhan people became extinct, not assimilated, caused by the massive migrations from the north by the Yemaek tribesmen which replaced the Japonic language with a Koreanic one as suggested by Vovin, Whitman, and others. Juha Janhunen proposed that the Koreanic language did not come from the north, but rather southeast, positing that the kingdom of Silla (successor of the Jinhan confederacy) spread the Koreanic system to the rest of the peninsula.

Regardless of the origins of the Koreanic language, the general consensus is that hints of possible Japonic influence has been identified within the Korean language, signifying a likelihood of the Samhan people being Japonic-related speakers in the region.

== Genetics ==
Anthropologically, the Samhan people are considered as one of the major contributors to modern day Korean's ancestry. They are believed to be descendants of the previous Jeulmun and Mumun immigrants according to archaeological evidence.

Ancient Chinese sources such as the Book of the Later Han and Records of the Three Kingdoms – Book of Wei, claim that the Samhan people looked similar to the people of Wa (Japan), hinting at a possible affinity to the inhabitants of the archipelago. According to Japanese sources such as the Nihon Shoki and Kojiki, the Samhan polities also had a close relationship with Wakoku as well as its successor, the Yamato Kingship.

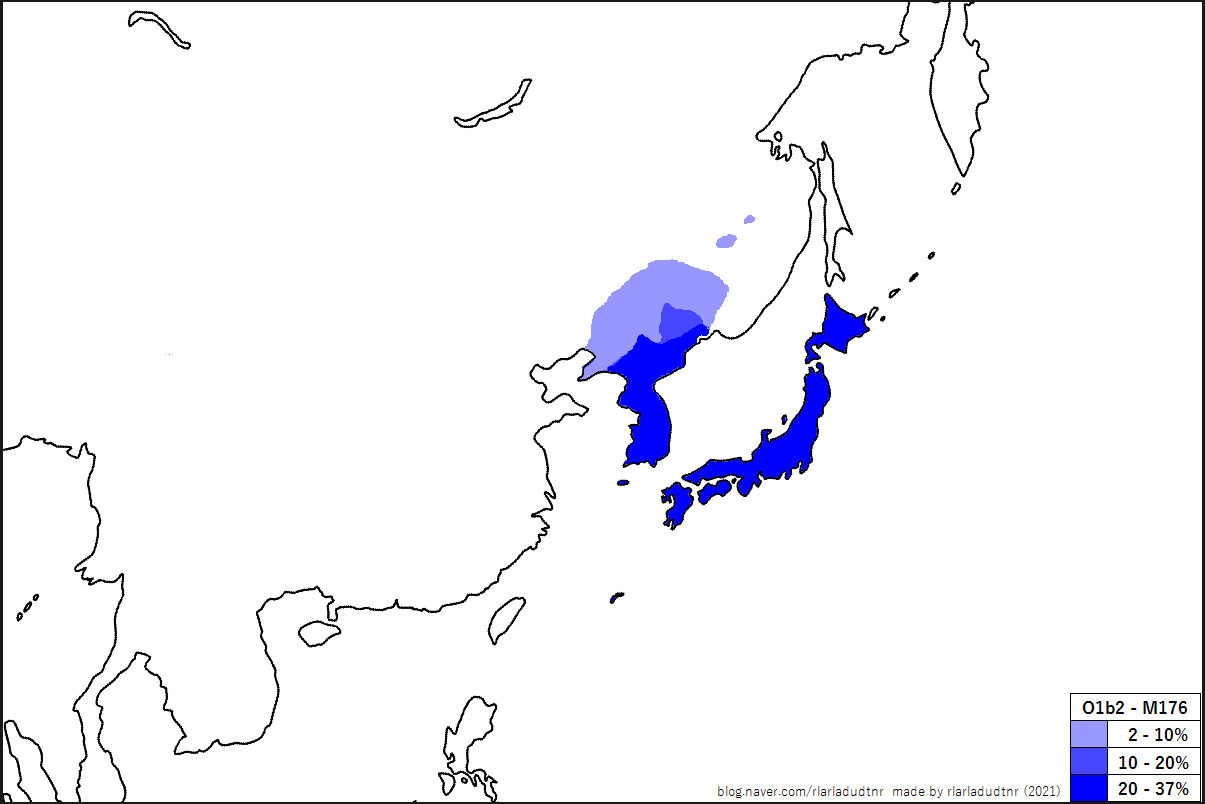
Distribution of Haplogroup O-M176

Genetically, the Samhan people are believed to have introduced the MtDNA Haplogroups M7a and O-M176 (Haplogroups that are commonly associated with the Jōmon people and Yayoi people of Japan, respectively) into the gene pool which are only found in modern day Koreans and Japanese people. By the beginning of the Three Kingdoms Period of Korea, the Samhan people most likely assimilated with the northern Yemaek group which possibly diluted their unique genetic markers resulting in a mixture that closely resembles the genetic makeup of modern day Koreans (as well as the Japanese via Toraijin).

『先是、朝鮮遺民分居山谷之間、爲六村、一曰閼川楊山村、二曰突山髙墟村、三曰觜山珍支村 或云干珍村、四曰茂山大樹村、五曰金山加利村、六曰明活山髙耶村、是爲辰韓六部。』

"In the beginning, there were six villages inhabited by the refugee [Old] Chosŏn people (Yemaek) within the valley; Alch'ŏn of Yangsan, Tolsan of Kohŏ, Ch'wisan of Chinji (or Kanjin), Musan of Taesu, Kŭmsan of Kari, and Myŏnghwalsan of Koya. These were known as the 'Six villages of Jinhan'."

— Kim Pusik, Samguk sagi, Book of Silla

By the end of the Samhan period, it is also recorded that the Samhan confederacies (Mahan/Byeonhan/Jinhan) also included Yemaek inhabitants, further adding credence to the possibility of the Yemaek and Samhan people constantly assimilating with one another throughout history.

== See also ==
- Samhan
  - Mahan confederacy
  - Byeonhan confederacy
  - Jinhan confederacy
- Yemaek
- Koreanic languages
  - Han languages
  - Ye-Maek language
