= Jin (Korean state) =

Korean state during the Iron Age

Jin state
- 4th century BCE–2nd century BCE
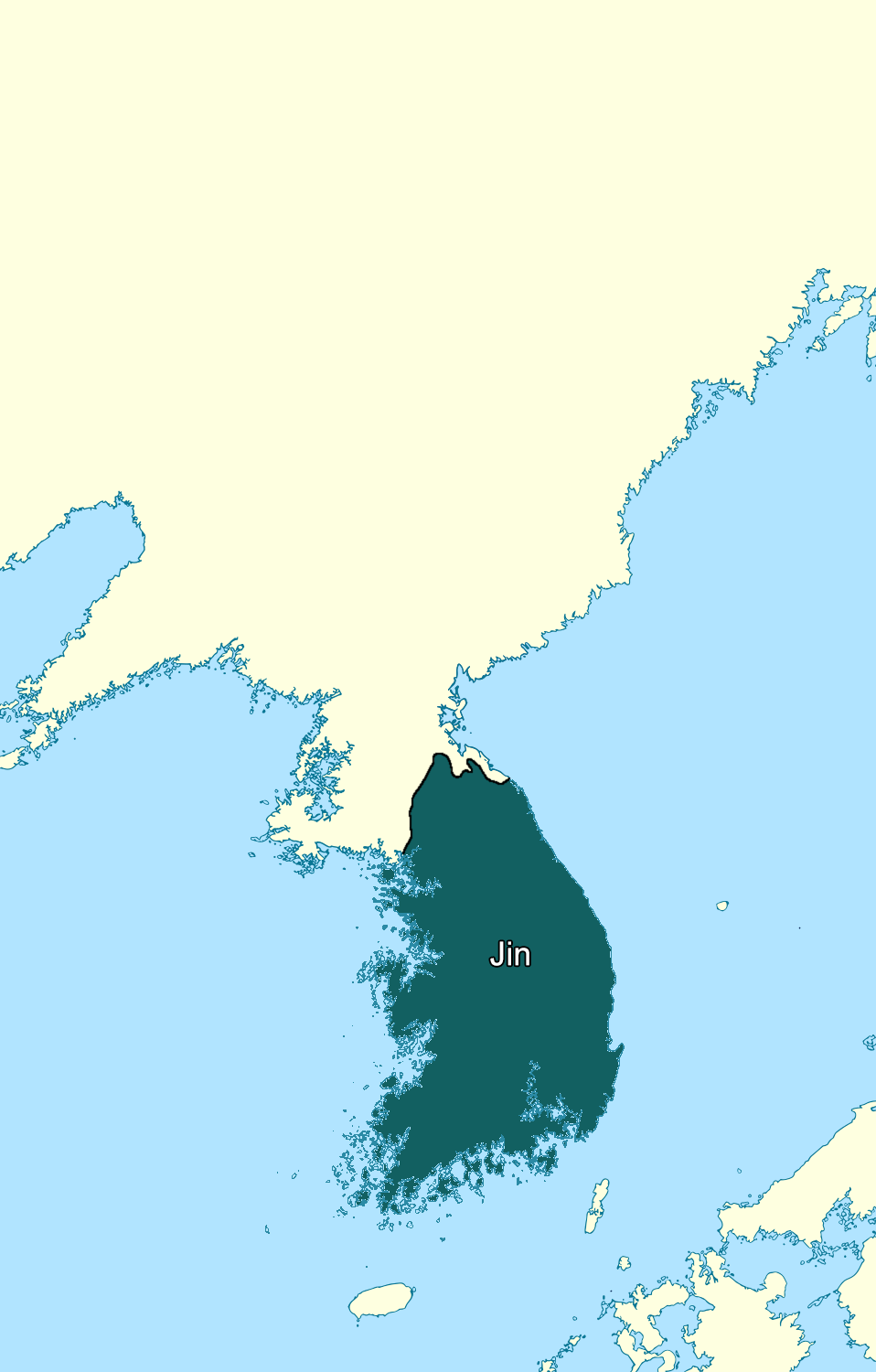
- Jin state in 108 BCE
- Capital: Unknown
- Common languages: Samhan or Peninsular Japonic
- Ethnic groups: Samhan people, possibly Yayoi people
- Religion: Musok, possibly Koshinto
- Government: Confederation
- Historical era: Ancient
  - Establishment: 4th century BCE
  - Succeeded by Samhan: 2nd century BCE
Succeeded by
Mahan confederacy
Byeonhan confederacy
Jinhan confederacy
- Today part of: South Korea; North Korea

Korean name
- Hangul: 진국
- Hanja: 辰國
- RR: Jinguk
- MR: Chin'guk
- IPA: [tɕinɡuk̚]

The state of Jin (Korean: 진; Hanja: 辰) was a confederacy of statelets which occupied some portion of the southern Korean peninsula from the 4th to 2nd centuries BCE, bordering the Korean Kingdom of Old Chosŏn (Gojoseon) to the north. Its capital was somewhere south of the Han River. It preceded the Samhan confederacies, each of which claimed to be the successor of the Jin state.

== Name ==
"Jin" is the Revised Romanization of Korean 진, originally written 辰 in Korean Chinese characters (hanja). This character's Old Chinese pronunciation has been reconstructed as /*[d]ər/ and originally referred to the 5th earthly branch of the Chinese and Korean zodiacs, a division of the orbit of Jupiter identified with the dragon. This was associated with a bearing of 120° (between ESE and SE) but also with the two-hour period between 7 and 9 am, leading it to be associated with dawn and the direction east.

A variant romanization of Jin is Chin under McCune–Reischauer romanization.

== History ==
The degree of the organization of Jin as a formal political state is unclear. It seems likely that it was a federation of small states much like the subsequent Samhan. For the state to be able to contend with its contemporary Wiman Chosŏn and send embassies to the court of the Western Han dynasty, there was probably some level of stable central authority. Korean historian Ki-baek Lee (1984, p. 24) also suggests that the kingdom's attempt to open direct contacts "suggests a strong desire on the part of Chin [Jin] to enjoy the benefits of Chinese metal culture." However, for the most part Wiman Chosŏn prevented direct contact between Jin and China.

King Jun of Old Chosŏn is reported to have fled to Jin after Wiman seized his throne and established Wiman Chosŏn. Some believe that Chinese mentions of Gaeguk or Gaemaguk (蓋馬國, literally means Kingdom of armored horses, located near Kaema Plateau) refers to Jin. Goguryeo is said to have conquered "Gaemaguk" in 26 CE, but this may refer to a different tribe in northern Korea. An official of Old Chosŏn called Yeok Gye Gyeong (歷谿卿), after failing to persuade Ugeo, is said to have defected from Old Chosŏn to Jin, which is described to be located at the East of Old Chosŏn.

Records are somewhat contradictory on Jin's demise: it either became the later Jinhan, or diverged into the Samhan as a whole. Archeological records of Jin have been found centered in territory that later became Mahan.

== Language ==
Alexander Vovin, among others, suggests that Japonic languages, which he classifies as Peninsular Japonic, were spoken in large parts of southern Korea and Jeju before they were replaced by proto-Koreanic languages. While it is believed that Koreanic/proto-Koreanic and Japonic/proto-Japonic (i.e. Peninsular Japonic) co-existed in the southern Korean Peninsula for an extended period of time, the establishment of Koreanic speakers and their assimilation of Japonic speakers may have played a role in a Yayoi migration to the Japanese archipelago, believed to have occurred between 1,000 BCE–300 CE, which overlaps with the period in which Jin is attested. Given this overlap, it is possible that, as Kōno Rokurō and Vovin suggest was the case with the later Korean kingdom of Paekche with regard to Puyŏ languages and Han languages, Jin may have been a bilingual state with regard to Koreanic languages and Peninsular Japonic.

South Korean historian Ki-Moon Lee classified the Puyŏ languages leading to "Goguryeo–Paekche–Wa" and the Han languages, the direct ancestor of modern Korean leading to "Old Chosŏn–Silla.”

While, Japanese historian Hideto Ito classified the Ye and Wa into the same language family.

== Archaeology ==
Archaeologically, Jin is commonly identified with the Korean bronze dagger culture, which succeeded the Liaoning bronze dagger culture in the late first millennium BCE. The most abundant finds from this culture have been in southwestern Korea's Chungcheong and Jeolla regions.

Artifacts of the culture also show some similarities to the Yayoi people of Kyūshū, Japan.

Archaeologically, the northern part of the Korean Peninsula is divided into "Violin-shaped daggers" (비파형동검; 琵琶形銅劍) and the southern part into “Slender daggers” (세형동검; 細形銅剣), but all of them are understood by modern scholars as data proving the southward movement of the Old Chosŏn. This is because it is a natural historical common sense for the civilized northerners of the Chinese continent to deliver to the southerners of the Korean Peninsula. Both "Violin-shaped daggers" and “Slender daggers” have been classified as Liaoning bronze dagger culture from a long time ago to today.

Hypothesis that Old Chosŏn was a society with a ‘bury alive with the dead culture’ was claimed by N.Korean academia. However, the S.Korean academic community opposes the ‘bury alive with the dead culture’ theory, and the S.Korean academic community claims it as a "cemeteries of generational communities or blood ties." However, it is pointed that there is a contradictory description occurring in the study of social differentiation in Bronze Age, in the S.Korean academic community. Contrary to the claim that the displaced people of Old Chosŏn founded Silla, few northern relics have been identified in the southern part of the peninsula. On the other hand, in the northeastern Jin area, the "Jung-do archeological culture," which is determined as a Ye-type culture, is being discovered.

== Legacy ==
Jin was succeeded by the Samhan: Mahan, Jinhan and Byeonhan. Chinese historical text, Records of the Three Kingdoms says that Jinhan is the successor of the Jin state, while the Book of the Later Han writes that Mahan, Jinhan and Byeonhan were all part of the former Jin state as well as 78 other tribes.

The name of Jin continued to be used in the name of the Jinhan confederacy and in the name "Byeonjin," an alternate term for Byeonhan. In addition, for some time the leader of Mahan continued to call himself the "Jin king," asserting nominal overlordship over all of the Samhan tribes.

== See also ==
- History of Korea
- Samhan

== Maps ==
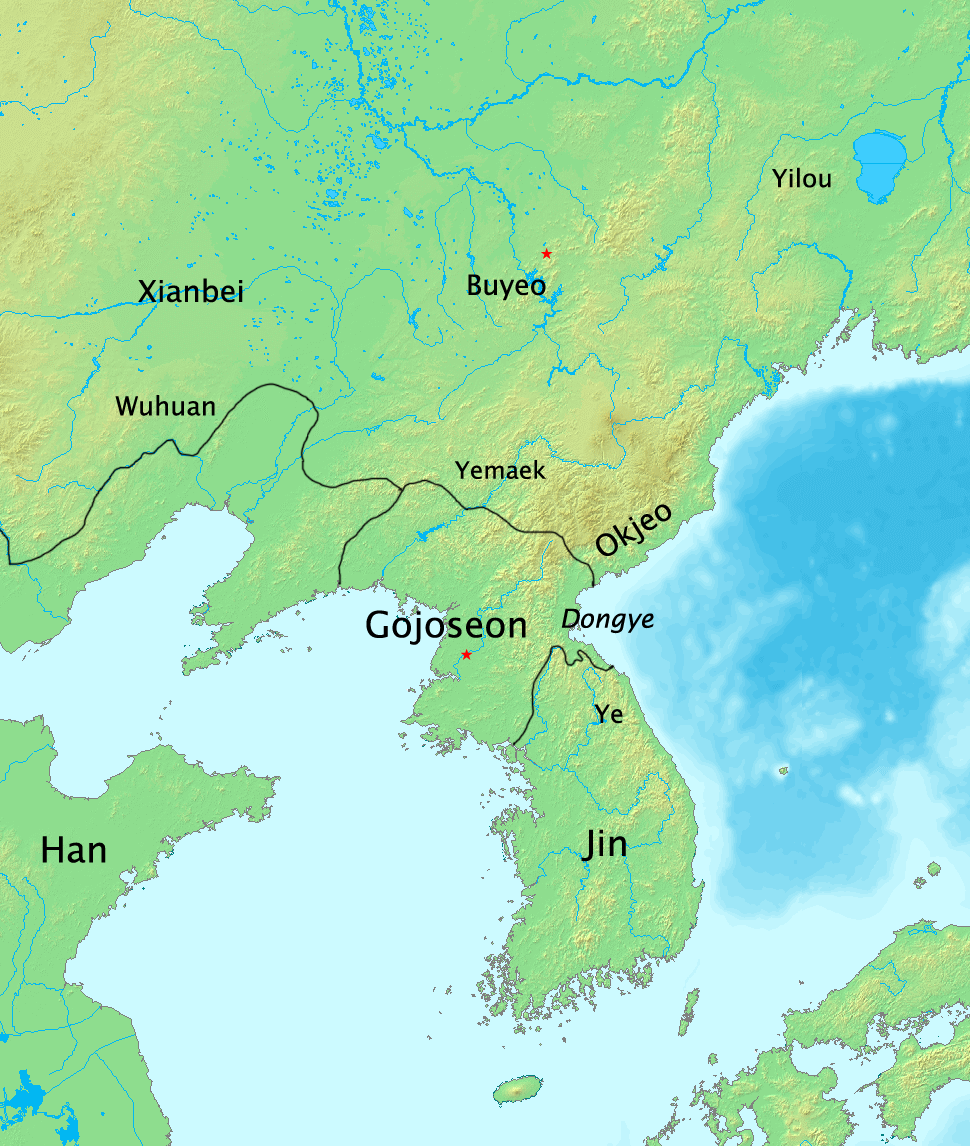
Korea in 108 BCE
