= Han languages =

Languages of the Samhan confederacies

Han
- Samhan
- Geographic distribution: Southern part of Korea
- Linguistic classification: Koreanic ?: Han
- Subdivisions: Mahan; Byeonhan; Jinhan

Language codes
- Glottolog: None
- Chinese commanderies (in purple) and their eastern neighbours mentioned in the Records of the Three Kingdoms

The Han languages (Korean: 한어; Hanja: 韓語) or Samhan languages (삼한어; 三韓語) were languages spoken by the people of the Samhan ('three Han') of ancient southern Korea, the confederacies of Mahan, Byeonhan and Jinhan. They are mentioned in surveys of the peninsula in the 3rd century found in Chinese histories, which also contain lists of placenames, but are otherwise unattested. Based on the description in these histories of cultural differences between the Samhan and the kingdoms of the north of the peninsula, Ki-Moon Lee assigned their languages to Han and Puyŏ groups respectively. There is no consensus about the relationships between these languages and the languages of later kingdoms.

== Records ==
The Samhan are known from Chinese histories. Chapter 30 of the Records of the Three Kingdoms (late 3rd century) and Chapter 85 of the Book of the Later Han (5th century) contain parallel accounts, apparently based on a common source, of peoples neighbouring the Four Commanderies of Han in northern Korea.

The Chinese histories describe the Samhan as culturally significantly different from the peoples of the northern part of the peninsula. They state that Jinhan had a different language from Mahan, listing some Jinhan words said to be shared with the Chinese state of Qin, from which the Jinhan claimed to be refugees (a claim discounted by most historians). The two accounts differ on the relationship between the languages of Byeonhan and Jinhan, with the Records of the Three Kingdoms describing them as similar, but the Book of the Later Han referring to differences.

The Records of the Three Kingdoms also gives phonographic transcriptions in Chinese characters of names of settlements, 54 in Mahan and 12 each in Byeonhan and Jinhan. Some of these names appear to include suffixes:

- Six of the Mahan names include a suffix *-pieliɑi ⟨卑離⟩, (Note: Later Han Chinese pronunciations are given for names from early Chinese texts.) which has been compared with the common element puri ⟨夫里⟩ 'town' in later Baekje placenames and Late Middle Korean -βɨr 'town'.
- Two of the Byeonhan names and one of the Jinhan names include a suffix *-mietoŋ ⟨彌凍⟩, which has been compared with Late Middle Korean mith and Proto-Japonic *mətə, both meaning 'base, bottom' and claimed by Samuel Martin to be cognate.
- One of the Byeonhan names ends with *-jama ⟨邪馬⟩, which is commonly identified with Proto-Japonic *jama 'mountain'.

The Gwanggaeto Stele (414) lists Goguryeo and Han villages, without subdividing the latter.

In the 4th century, Baekje, the Gaya confederacy and Silla arose from Mahan, Byeonhan and Jinhan respectively. (Note: Traditional histories give founding dates for Baekje and Silla of 18 BC and 57 BC respectively, and these dates are repeated in textbooks, but archaeological and documentary evidence indicates that these kingdoms were founded in the 4th century.) Linguistic evidence from these states is sparse and, being recorded in Chinese characters, difficult to interpret. Most of these materials come from Silla, whose language is generally believed to be ancestral to all extant Korean varieties as a result of the Sillan unification of most of the peninsula in the late 7th century.

Apart from placenames, whose interpretation is controversial, data on the Baekje language is extremely sparse:

- The Book of Liang (635) states that the language of Baekje was the same as that of Goguryeo.
- The Book of Zhou (636) states that the Baekje gentry and commoners have different words for 'king'.
- According to the Samguk sagi, the kingdom of Baekje was founded by immigrants from Goguryeo who took over Mahan.
- The Japanese history Nihon Shoki, compiled in the early 8th century from earlier documents, including some from Baekje, records 42 Baekje words. These are transcribed as Old Japanese syllables, which are restricted to the form (C)V, limiting the precision of the transcription. About half of them appear to be Koreanic.

A single word is directly attributed to the Gaya language in the Samguk sagi (1145). It is the word for 'gate', and appears to resemble the Old Japanese word for 'gate'.

== Interpretations ==
Different authors have offered a variety of views on the natures of these languages, based on the extant records and evidence that Peninsular Japonic languages were still spoken in southern and central parts of the peninsula in the early centuries of the common era. The issue is politically charged in Korea, with scholars who point out differences being accused by nationalists of trying to "divide the homeland".

Based on the account of the Records of the Three Kingdoms, linguist Ki-Moon Lee divided the languages spoken on the Korean peninsula at that time into Puyŏ and Han groups. Lee originally proposed that these were two branches of a Koreanic language family, a view that was widely adopted by scholars in Korea. He later argued that the Puyŏ languages were intermediate between Korean and Japanese.

Christopher Beckwith argues that the Han languages were Koreanic, and replaced the Japonic Puyŏ languages from the 7th century. Alexander Vovin and James Marshall Unger argue that the Han languages were Japonic, and were replaced by Koreanic Puyŏ languages in the 4th century.

Based on the vocabulary in the Nihon Shoki and the passage in the Book of Zhou about words for 'king', Kōno Rokurō argued that the kingdom of Baekje was bilingual, with the gentry speaking a Puyŏ language and the common people a Han language. Juha Janhunen argues that Baekje was Japonic speaking until Koreanic expanded from Silla.

== See also ==
- Old Korean
