= Puyŏ languages =

Ancient languages of northeast Asia

Puyŏ
- Puyo-Koguryoic
- Geographic distribution: Korean Peninsula, Manchuria
- Linguistic classification: Koreanic ?: Puyŏ
- Subdivisions: Buyeo; Goguryeo; Okjeo; Ye-Maek; Baekje ?

Language codes
- Glottolog: None
- Chinese commanderies (in purple) and their eastern neighbours mentioned in the Records of the Three Kingdoms

The Puyŏ (Korean: 부여; RR: Buyeo; MR: Puyŏ; Chinese: 扶餘; pinyin: Fúyú) or Puyo-Koguryoic languages are four languages of northern Korea and eastern Manchuria mentioned in ancient Chinese sources. The languages of Buyeo, Goguryeo, Dongye and Okjeo were said to be similar to one another but different from the languages of the Yilou and Mohe to the north (believed on non-linguistic grounds to be Tungusic). Other sources suggest that the ruling class of Baekje may have spoken a Puyŏ language.

The Puyŏ languages are very poorly attested, and their affiliation is unclear. However, most researchers in Korea assume that Puyŏ is a branch of the Koreanic language family. Other researchers hold a range of views on the affiliation of the Goguryeo language: that the evidence is insufficient to classify it, that it was Japonic, that it was Tungusic, or that it was the ancestor of Korean that subsequently spread to the south of the peninsula.

== Languages of early Korea and eastern Manchuria ==
Chinese histories provide the only contemporaneous descriptions of peoples of the Korean Peninsula and eastern Manchuria in the early centuries of the common era. They contain impressionistic remarks about the languages of the area based on second-hand reports, and sometimes contradict one another.

Chapter 30 "Description of the Eastern Barbarians" of the Records of the Three Kingdoms records a survey carried out by the Chinese state of Wei after their defeat of Goguryeo in 244. Regarding the languages of Buyeo, Goguryeo, Okjeo and Ye, the report says:

- (of Goguryeo) "in language and in many things they are similar to Buyeo",
- (of Okjeo) "the language is much the same as Goguryeo but with small differences here and there",
- (of Ye) "their language, laws, and customs are for the most part the same as those of Goguryeo".

The same text records that the language of the Yilou to the north differed from that of Buyeo and Goguryeo. Chapter 94 of the History of the Northern Dynasties (compiled in 659) states that the language of the Mohe in the same area was different from that of Goguryeo. The languages of the Yilou and Mohe are completely unattested, but are believed, on the basis of their location and the description of the people, to have been Tungusic.

The "Description of the Eastern Barbarians" also describes the Samhan ('three Han') in the southern part of the Korean Peninsula as culturally significantly different from the northern peoples. Based on this text, Ki-Moon Lee divided the languages spoken on the Korean Peninsula at that time into Puyŏ and Han groups. Lee originally proposed that these were two branches of a Koreanic language family, a view that was widely adopted by scholars in Korea. (Note: Kim Nam-Kil describes Puyŏ and Han as two dialects of the ancient Korean language.) He later argued that the Puyŏ languages were intermediate between Korean and Japanese.

Christopher Beckwith claimed that the Puyŏ languages (which he called Koguryoic) were most closely related to Japanese. Beckwith's work has been criticized on both linguistic and historical grounds, though the former presence of Japonic languages on the Korean Peninsula is widely accepted. Alexander Vovin and James Marshall Unger argue that Goguryeo brought an early form of the Korean language to the peninsula from Manchuria, replacing the Japonic languages which they believe were spoken in the Samhan. Some authors believe that the Puyŏ languages belong to the Tungusic family. Juha Janhunen discounts the Chinese statements, suggesting that the dynastic languages of Buyeo and Goguryeo may have been Amuric and Tungusic respectively. Others believe that there is insufficient evidence to support a classification.

The Book of Liang (635) states that the language of Baekje was the same as that of Goguryeo. According to Korean traditional history, the kingdom of Baekje was founded by immigrants from Goguryeo who took over the Mahan confederacy. Based on a passage in the Book of Zhou (636) and some Baekje words cited in the Japanese history Nihon Shoki (720), Kōno Rokurō argued that the kingdom of Baekje was bilingual, with the gentry speaking a Puyŏ language and the common people a Han language.

== Linguistic data ==
There is no evidence of the languages of Buyeo, Okjeo or Ye, but Goguryeo became a powerful kingdom, conquering much of central Korea before it was destroyed by the armies of Silla and the Chinese Tang dynasty in the late 7th century. The Korean history Samguk sagi contains glosses of placenames from Goguryeo, but these are difficult to interpret, and many scholars also doubt that they reflect the language of Goguryeo. Other evidence of the Goguryeo language is extremely meagre.

Chapter 37 of the Samguk sagi (compiled in 1145) contains a list of pronunciations and meanings of placenames in the former kingdom of Goguryeo. Both are recorded in Chinese characters, making their pronunciations difficult to interpret, but different names appear to resemble Korean, Japonic and Tungusic words. Other authors point out that most of the place names come from central Korea, an area captured by Goguryeo from Baekje and other states in the 5th century, and none from the historical homeland of Goguryeo north of the Taedong River. These authors suggest that the place names reflect the languages of those states rather than that of Goguryeo. This would explain why they seem to reflect multiple language groups. It is generally agreed that these glosses demonstrate that Japonic languages were once spoken in part of the Korean peninsula, but there is no consensus on the identity of the speakers.

A small number of inscriptions have been found in Goguryeo, the earliest being the Gwanggaeto Stele (erected in Ji'an in 414). All are written in Chinese, but feature some irregularities that reflect the native language of their authors. These include occasional use of object–verb order (as found in Korean) instead of the usual Chinese verb–object order, and particles 之 and 伊, for which some authors have proposed Korean interpretations.

Chinese texts such as the Book of Wei (6th century) contain a few Goguryeo words, which appear to have Korean etymologies. The Jurchen and Manchu languages contain loanwords that appear to be Korean; Alexander Vovin proposes Goguryeo as the likely source.

== See also ==
- History of Korean
- Old Korean
- Peninsular Japonic
