= Goguryeo language =

Speculated language of ancient Goguryeo

Goguryeo
- Koguryŏ
- Native to: Goguryeo, Balhae?
- Region: Manchuria, Korea
- Extinct: 7th–10th century?
- Language family: Koreanic?: Puyŏ; Goguryeo

Language codes
- ISO 639-3: zkg
- Glottolog: kogu1234
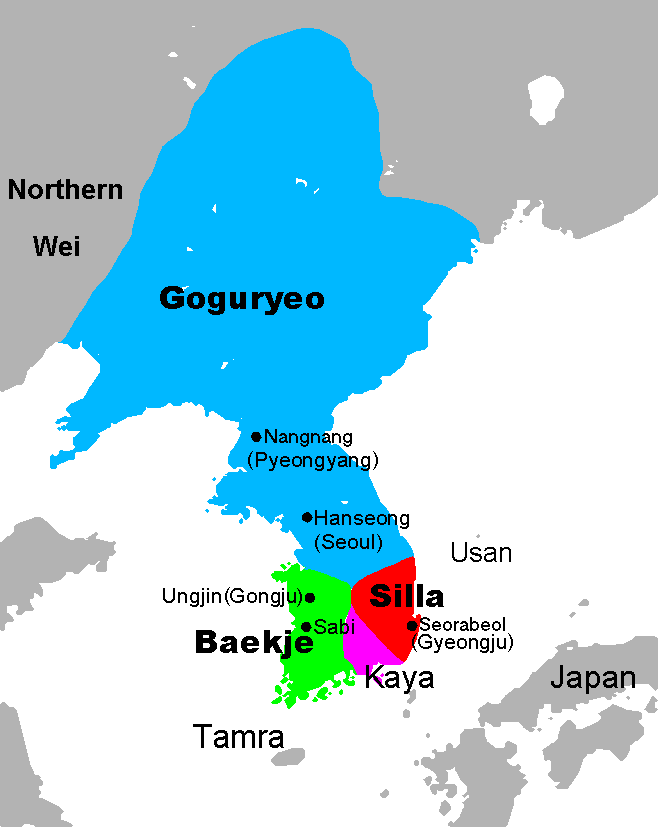
- The Three Kingdoms of Korea, with Goguryeo and Buyeo in blue (Kaya is not included in the Three Kingdoms)

The Goguryeo language, or Koguryoan, was the language of the ancient kingdom of Goguryeo (37 BCE – 668 CE), one of the Three Kingdoms of Korea. Early Chinese histories state that the language was similar to those of Buyeo, Okjeo and Ye. Ki-Moon Lee grouped these four as the Puyŏ languages. The histories also stated that these languages were different from those of the Yilou and Mohe. All of these languages are unattested except for Goguryeo, for which evidence is limited and controversial.

The most cited evidence is a body of placename glosses in the Samguk sagi. Most researchers in Korea, assuming that the people of Goguryeo spoke a dialect of Old Korean, have treated these words as Korean, while other scholars have emphasized similarities with Japonic languages. Lee and Ramsey suggest that the language was intermediate between the two families. Other authors suggest that these placenames reflect the languages of other peoples in the part of central Korea captured by Goguryeo in the 5th century, rather than Goguryeo itself.

Other evidence is extremely sparse, and is limited to peculiarities in the Chinese language of Goguryeo inscriptions and a very few Goguryeo words glossed in Chinese texts. Vovin and Unger suggest that it was the original form of Koreanic, which subsequently replaced Japonic languages in the south of the peninsula. Others maintain that it was Tungusic, or that there is insufficient evidence to establish its affiliation.

== Descriptions in Chinese sources ==
Chinese commanderies (in purple) and their eastern neighbours mentioned in the Records of the Three Kingdoms

Chinese histories provide the only contemporaneous descriptions of peoples of the Korean Peninsula and eastern Manchuria in the early centuries of the common era. They contain impressionistic remarks about the languages of the area based on second-hand reports, and sometimes contradict one another. Later Korean histories, such as the Samguk sagi, do not describe the languages of the three kingdoms.

The state of Buyeo, in the upper Songhua basin, was known to the Chinese from the 3rd century BCE. Chapter 30 "Description of the Eastern Barbarians" of the Records of the Three Kingdoms records a survey carried out by the Chinese state of Wei after their defeat of Goguryeo in 244. Another version of this report, likely from a common source, is found in chapter 85 of the Book of the Later Han (5th century). The report states that the languages of Buyeo, Goguryeo and Ye were similar, and that the language of Okjeo was only slightly different from them. Goguryeo, originally inhabiting the valley of the Hun River, believed themselves to be a southern offshoot of Buyeo. Over the next few centuries they would expand to rule much of eastern Manchuria and northern Korea.

To the south of the Chinese Lelang Commandery lay the Samhan ('three Han'), Mahan, Byeonhan and Jinhan, who the Records of the Three Kingdoms described in quite different terms from Buyeo and Goguryeo. Based on this text, Ki-Moon Lee divided the languages spoken on the Korean peninsula at that time into Puyŏ and Han groups.

The same text states that the language of the Yilou to the northeast differed from that of Buyeo and Goguryeo. Chapter 94 of the History of the Northern Dynasties (compiled in 659) states that the language of the Mohe in the same area was different from that of Goguryeo. These languages are completely unattested, but are believed, on the basis of their location and the description of the people, to have been Tungusic.

The Book of Liang (635) states that the language of Baekje was the same as that of Goguryeo. According to Korean traditional history, the kingdom of Baekje was founded by immigrants from Goguryeo who took over Mahan.

== Placename glosses in the Samguk sagi ==
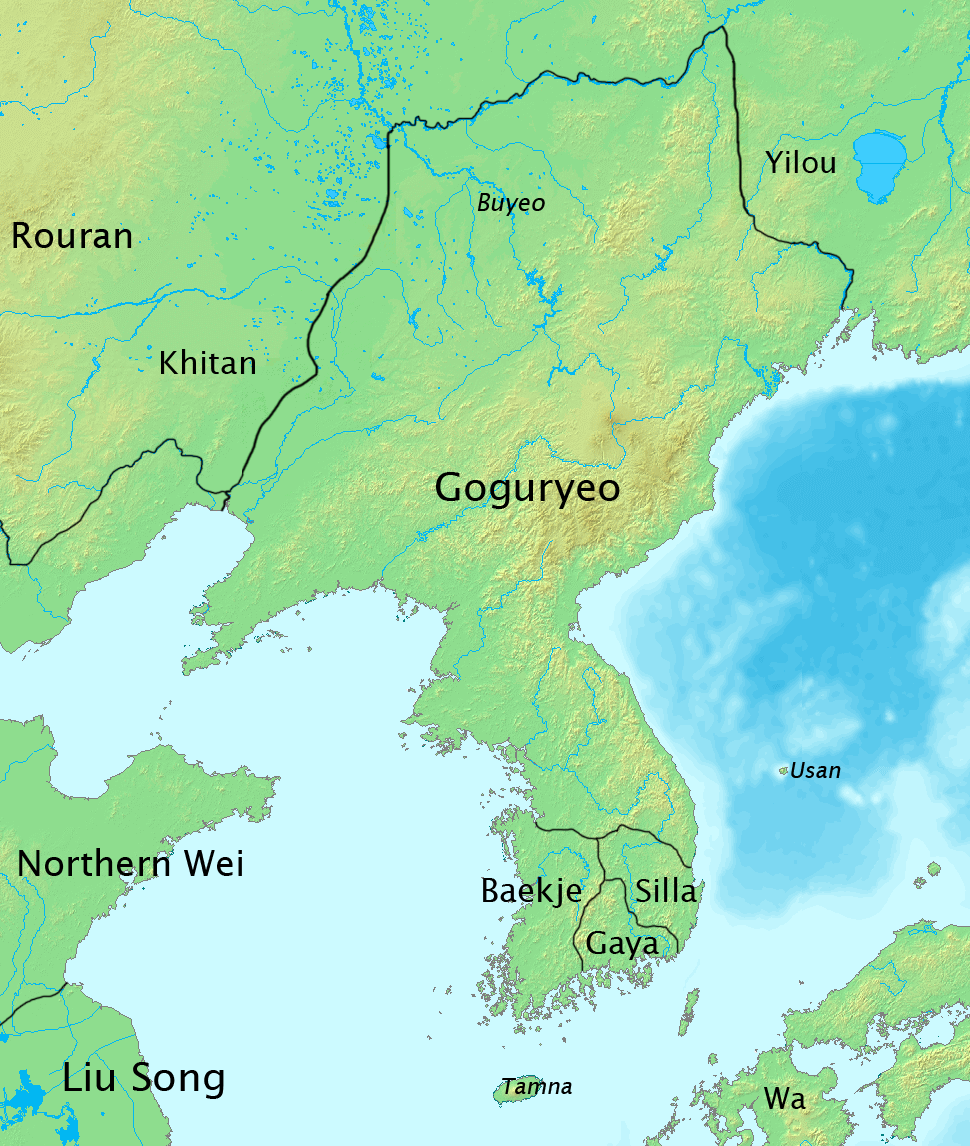
The Korean peninsula in the late 5th century

The most widely cited evidence for Goguryeo is chapter 37 of the Samguk sagi, a history of the Three Kingdoms period written in Classical Chinese and compiled in 1145 from earlier records that are no longer extant. This chapter surveys the part of Goguryeo annexed by Silla, with entries like

七重縣一云難隱別

The phrase 一云 'one calls' separates two alternative names for a place. The first part, 七重縣, can be read in Chinese as 'seven-fold county', while 難隱別 is meaningless, and hence seems to use Chinese characters to represent the sound of the name. From other examples, scholars infer that 難隱 means 'seven' and 別 means '-fold, layer', while the 'county' part of the gloss is not represented. In this way, a vocabulary of 80 to 100 words has been extracted from these place names. Although the pronunciations recorded using Chinese characters are difficult to interpret, some of these words appear to resemble Koreanic, Japonic and Tungusic words. It is generally agreed that these glosses demonstrate that Japonic languages were once spoken in part of the Korean peninsula, but there is no consensus on the identity of the speakers.

Scholars who take these words as representing the language of Goguryeo have come to a range of conclusions about the language. Most Korean scholars view it as a form of Old Korean and focus on Korean interpretations of the data. In the early 20th century, Japanese scholars such as Naitō Konan and Shinmura Izuru pointed out similarities to Japanese, particularly in the only attested numerals, 3, 5, 7 and 10:

Numerals in the Samguk sagi glosses
| Native word | | | Gloss | Old Japanese numeral |
| Script | Middle Chinese (Note: Middle Chinese forms are given using Baxter's transcription for Middle Chinese. The letters H and X denote Middle Chinese tone categories.) | Sino-Korean (Note: Korean forms are cited using the Yale romanization of Korean.) | Gloss | Old Japanese numeral |
|---|---|---|---|---|
| 密 | mit | mil | 三 'three' | mi_{1} |
| 于次 | hju-tshij^{H} | wucha | 五 'five' | itu |
| 難隱 | nan-ʔɨn^{X} | nanun | 七 'seven' | nana |
| 德 | tok | tek | 十 'ten' | to_{2}wo |

Beckwith proposed Japonic etymologies for most of the words, and argued that Koguryoan was Japonic. Beckwith's linguistic analysis has been criticized for the ad hoc nature of his Chinese reconstructions, for his handling of Japonic material and for hasty rejection of possible cognates in other languages. Lee and Ramsey argue that Koguryoan was somehow intermediate between Koreanic and Japonic.

Other authors point out that most of the place names come from central Korea, an area captured by Goguryeo from Baekje and other states in the 5th century, and none from the historical homeland of Goguryeo north of the Taedong River. By the 5th century, Goguryeo ruled a huge area encompassing many ethnic groups and languages. These authors suggest that the place names reflect the languages of those states rather than that of Goguryeo. This would explain why they seem to reflect multiple language groups.

== Other data ==
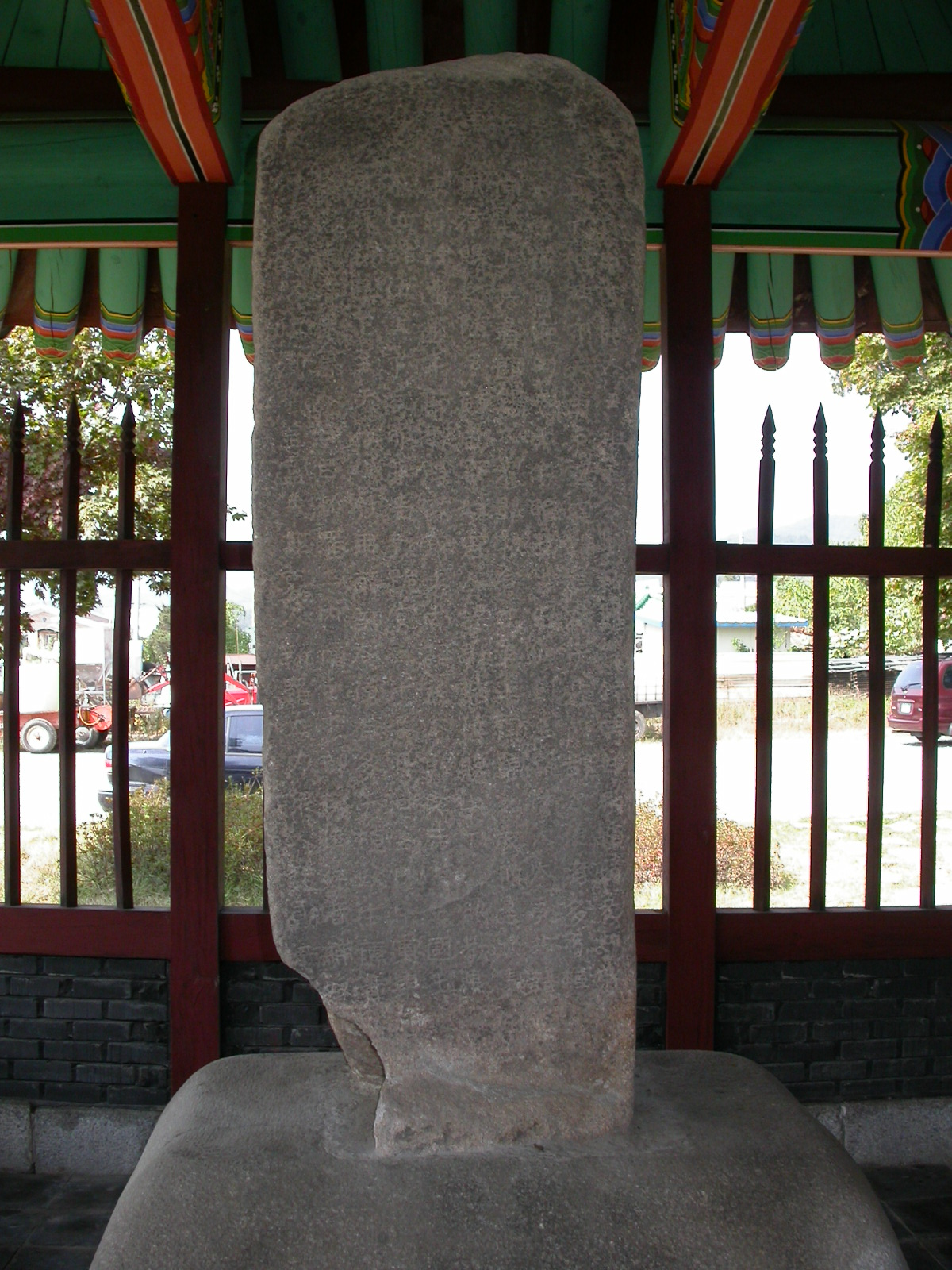
Goguryeo monument in Jungwon, Chungju

Other data on the language of Goguryeo is extremely sparse, and its affiliation remains unclear.

A small number of inscriptions have been found in Goguryeo territory, including the Gwanggaeto Stele (erected in Ji'an in 414), four inscriptions on the walls of Pyongyang Castle, and a stele in Jungwon, Chungju (590s). All are written in Chinese, but some of them contain irregularities, including a few examples of object–verb order (as found in Korean and other northeast Asian languages) instead of the usual Chinese verb–object order, and some uses of the characters 之 and 伊, which some authors have connected to their use to represent Korean particles in later Idu texts from Unified Silla.

Beckwith identified a dozen names of places and people in Chinese histories that he argued were Goguryeo words. In his review of Beckwith's book, Byington criticized the historical basis of these identifications, as well as Beckwith's theories of Goguryeo origins in western Liaoning.

Chinese histories contain a few glosses of Goguryeo words:

- Chapter 30 of the Records of the Three Kingdoms (late 3rd century) states that 溝漊 (Eastern Han Chinese *koro, Middle Chinese kuw-luw) is the Goguryeo word for 'castle'. Beckwith compared this word with Old Japanese kura 'storehouse'. Alexander Vovin compared it with Middle Mongolian qoto-n and Manchu hoton 'fortified town', but with lenition of t as in Korean.
- Chapter 100 of the Book of Wei (mid-6th century) gives 謁奢 ʔjot-syæ 'big elder brother' and 太奢 thaj^{H}-syae 'little elder brother'. Vovin compared ʔjot with Late Middle Korean nyěys 'old' and thaj^{H} with an Early Middle Korean word 'small, young' transcribed as ʔæ^{H}-thwoj^{H} (亞退) in the Jilin leishi (1103–1104). The word syæ is closely matched by Old Japanese se 'elder brother', but this has a limited distribution in Japonic, and may be a loanword.
- The same chapter gives the name of Jumong, the legendary founder of Goguryeo, as 朱蒙 (Middle Chinese tsyu-muwng), glossed as 'good archer'. This name appears in the Gwanggaeto Stele as 鶵牟 (Eastern Han Chinese *dẓo-mu, Middle Chinese tsrhju-mjuw). Vovin compared the first syllable with Middle Korean tywǒh- 'be good', but was unable to identify a match for the second part.
- Chapter 41 of the Book of Zhou (early 7th century) gives 骨蘇 kwot-su 'ceremonial headgear', which Vovin compared with the first part of Middle Korean kwoskál 'ceremonial headgear'.

Vovin also pointed to Koreanic loanwords in Jurchen and Manchu, and argued that the Goguryeo language was the ancestor of Koreanic, and spread southwards to replace the Japonic languages of the Samhan. J. Marshall Unger has proposed a similar model on historical grounds.

Other authors suggest that the Goguryeo language was a Tungusic language. Juha Janhunen argues for a Tungusic affiliation based on historical evidence that the Jurchens of the Jin dynasty and later the Manchus of the Qing dynasty that rose from the former territory of Goguryeo were Tungusic speakers.

== See also ==
- Baekje language
- Puyŏ languages
- Balhae
- History of the Korean language
- Old Korean
