= Ye-Maek language =

Ancient Koreanic language of Manchuria

Ye-Maek
- Yemaek, Maek
- Native to: North Korea, South Korea and China
- Region: Manchuria, northeastern part of the Korean Peninsula
- Ethnicity: Yemaek
- Era: possibly 6th-2nd centuries BCE
- Language family: Koreanic: Puyŏ?; Ye-Maek

Language codes
- ISO 639-3: hmk
- Glottolog: None
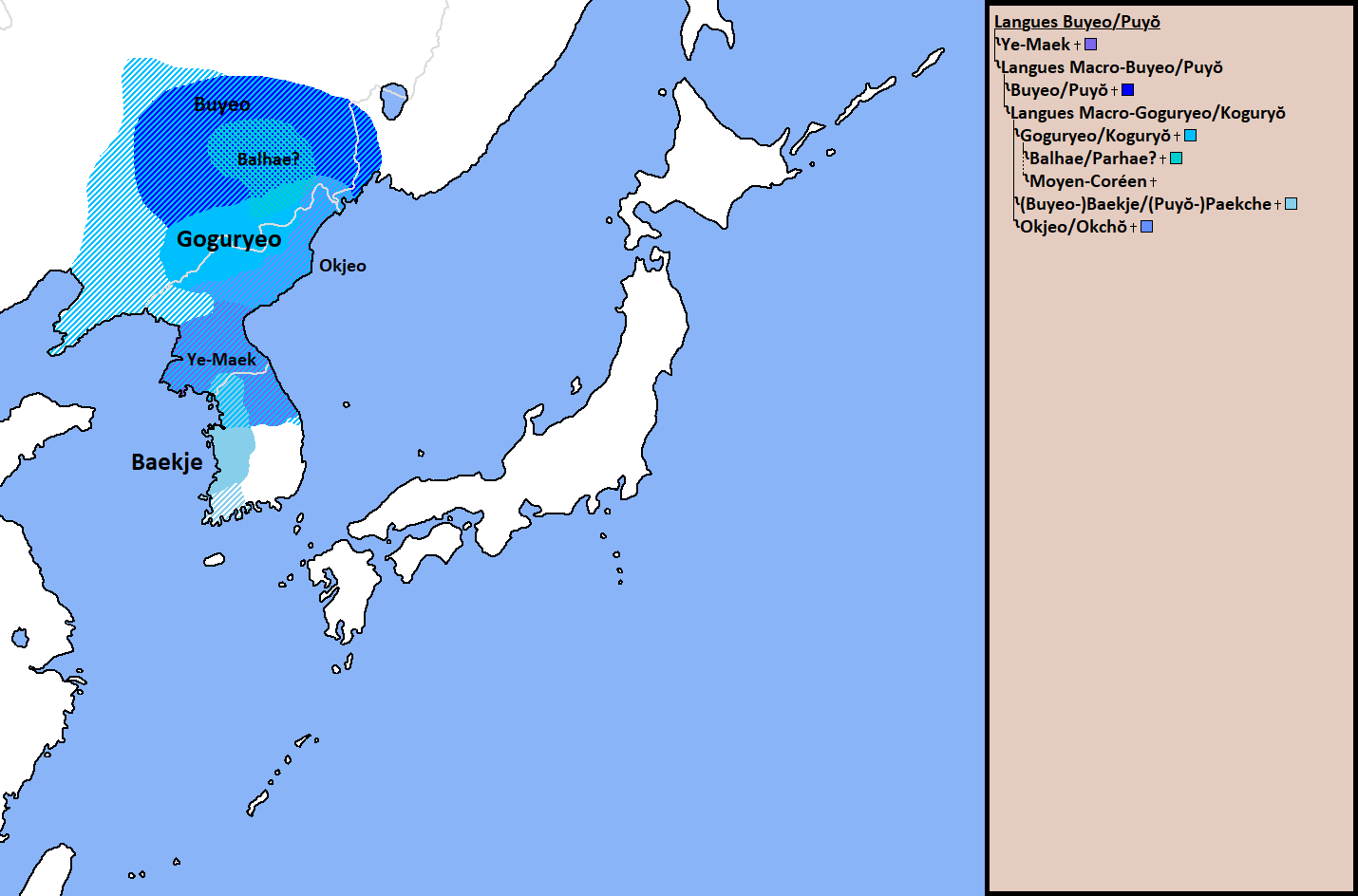
- Map of the Buyeo languages, including Ye-Maek Buyeo Goguryeo Balhae Okjeo Ye-Maek Baekje

Ye-Maek (예맥어; 濊貊語), also known as Yemaek and Maek, is a Koreanic language of Manchuria and eastern Korea north of Silla spoken in the last few centuries BC. It is possibly ancestral to the Koguryoic.

The Yemaek people had historical ties to later Korean kingdoms and may have been ancestral to several, such as Gojoseon; the Ye of Yemaek are reported to have been a synonym for Buyeo and the Maek for Goguryeo. Their language may have been one of, or ancestral to, the Koguryoic languages.

Evidence for the language is limited to toponyms, and its existence is questionable. Attempts at recovering Yemaek words from toponyms in the Samguk Sagi historical record are disputed.
