= Buyeo language =

Language spoken in the Buyeo kingdom

Buyeo
- Puyŏ
- Native to: Buyeo Kingdom
- Region: Manchuria
- Extinct: 7th century
- Language family: Koreanic ?: Puyŏ; Buyeo

Language codes
- ISO 639-3: xpy
- Glottolog: None
- Buyeo in the 3rd century

Very little is known of the language of the Buyeo kingdom. Chapter 30 "Description of the Eastern Barbarians" in the Records of the Three Kingdoms records a survey carried out by the Chinese state of Wei after their defeat of Goguryeo in 244. The report states that the languages of Buyeo and those of its southern neighbours Goguryeo and Ye were similar, and that the language of Okjeo was only slightly different from them. Based on this text, Ki-Moon Lee grouped the four languages as the Puyŏ languages, contemporaneous with the Han languages of the Samhan confederacies in southern Korea.

The most widely cited evidence for this group is a body of placename glosses in the Samguk sagi (1154), which some authors take to represent the language of Goguryeo, but others believe reflect a mix of languages spoken by peoples conquered by Goguryeo. Scholars who take these words as representing the language of Goguryeo have come to a range of conclusions about the language, some holding that it was Koreanic, others that it was Japonic, and others that it was somehow intermediate between these families.

The same chapter of the Records of the Three Kingdoms transcribes a Buyeo word for noblemen subordinate only to the king as 加. This character was pronounced kai in Eastern Han Chinese. Beckwith identified this word with a Samguk sagi gloss 皆/皆次 (pronounced kɛj/kɛjtshij^{H} in Middle Chinese, kay/kaycha in Sino-Korean) for 'king', and the Baekje language word for 'ruler' transcribed in the Nihon Shoki as Old Japanese ki_{1}si.
