= Okjeo =

Former tribal state in Korea

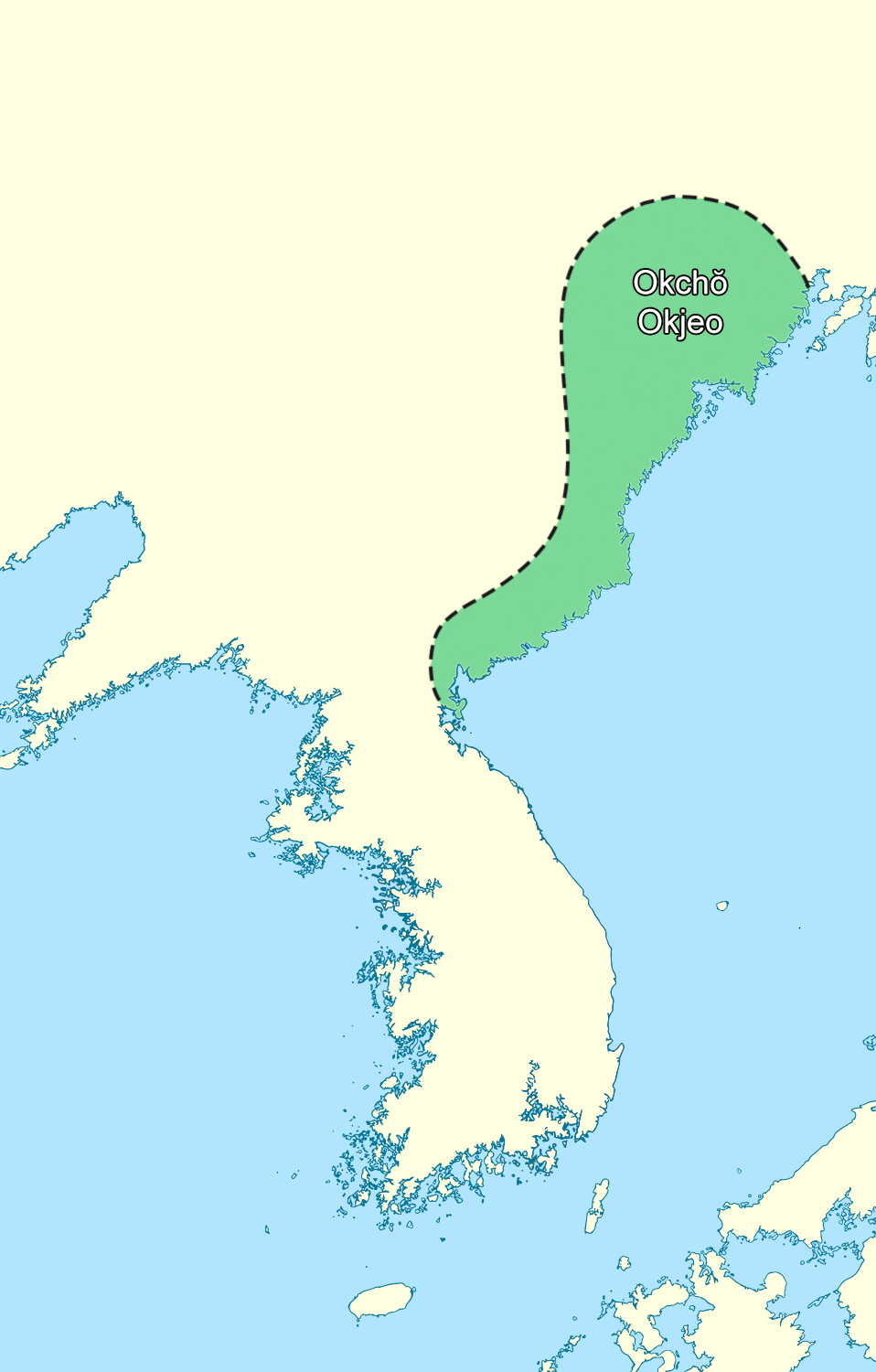
- Estimated area of Okjeo

Korean name
- Hangul: 옥저
- Hanja: 沃沮
- RR: Okjeo
- MR: Okchŏ
- IPA: [ok̚.t͈ɕʌ]

Okjeo (Korean: 옥저; Hanja: 沃沮) was an ancient Korean tribal state which arose in the northern Korean peninsula from perhaps the 2nd century BCE to the 5th century CE.

Dong-okjeo (Eastern Okjeo) occupied roughly the area of the Hamgyŏng provinces of North Korea, and Buk-okjeo (Northern Okjeo) occupied the Duman River region.

Dong-okjeo was often simply called Okjeo, while Buk-okjeo was also sometimes referred to as Chiguru (置溝婁, 치구루) or Guru (구루), the latter name being also applied to Goguryeo. Okjeo bordered the other minor state of Dongye on the south, and shared a similar fate.

== History ==
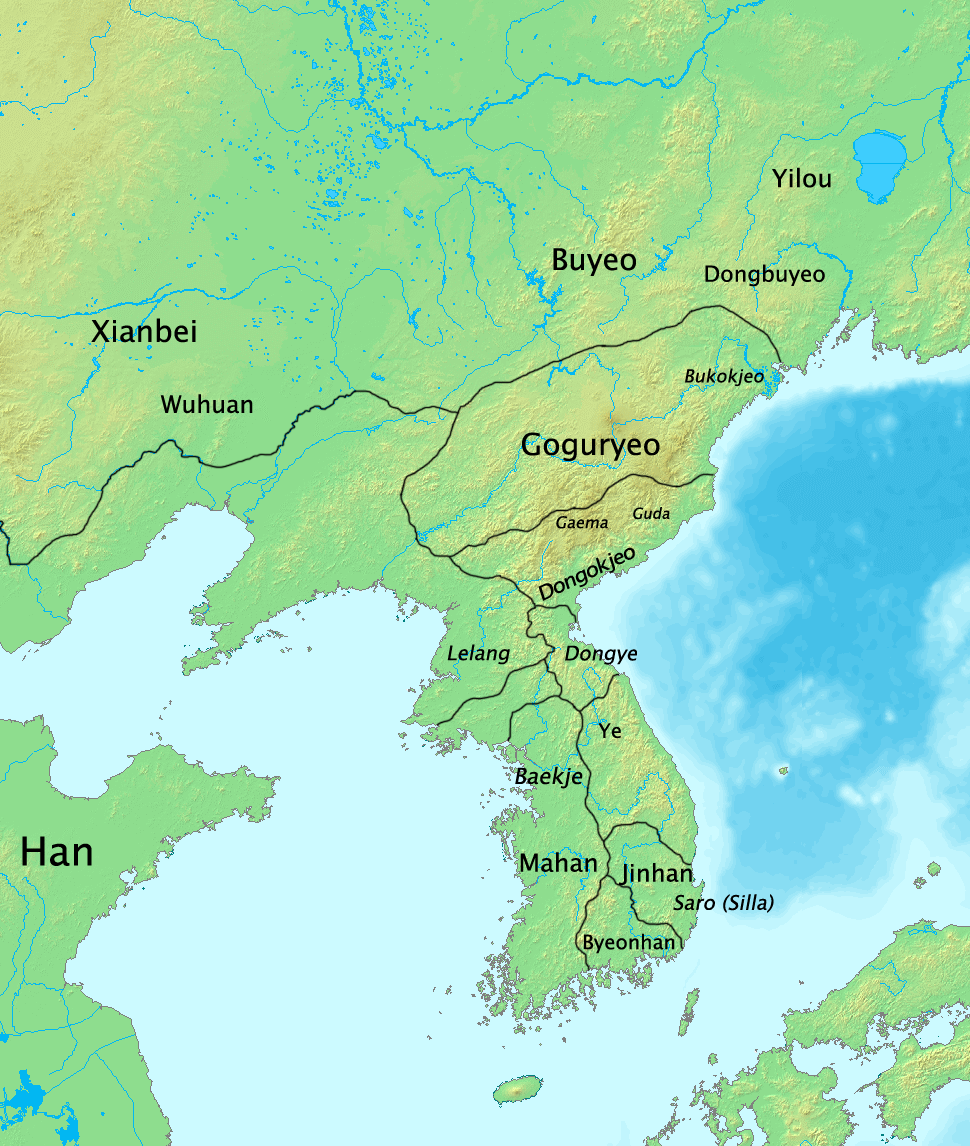
Proto–Three Kingdoms, c. 1 CE.

In its early history, Okjeo oscillated between domination by the Chinese commanderies and by Goguryeo. From the 3rd century BCE to 108 BCE, it was controlled by Gojoseon. At 107 BCE, it became part of the Xuantu Commandery. As the Xuantu Commandery retreated towards the liadong peninsula as a result of expansion of Goguryeo, East okjeo became part of the eastern part of the Lelang Commandery. Due to the constant interference of its neighbours, Okjeo never grew into a fully centralised kingdom. In 28 BCE, King Dongmyeong sent Bu Wiyeom to attack the Northern Okjeo. In the 1st or 2nd century CE, King Taejo of Goguryeo reduced Okjeo to a tributary, which delivered local products to Goguryeo. During the 244 Wei Invasion of Goguryeo, Goguryeo's King Dongcheon briefly retreated to North Okjeo, and in 285, the Buyeo court also temporarily escaped to Okjeo under northern nomadic attacks.

In early 5th century, Okjeo was completely conquered by Gwanggaeto the Great of Goguryeo.

== Culture ==
Eastern Okjeo is located to the east of the great mountains of Gaema in Goguryeo; its people make their settlements on the shore of the great sea. In shape their land is narrow in the northeast and long in the southwest, where it is perhaps a thousand li. It is contiguous on the north with Yilou and Buyeo, and on the south with Yemaek. Its households number five thousand. They have no supreme Ruler, each village having its own hereditary chief. Their language has broad similarity with that of Goguryeo, though at times there are small differences... Their land is fair and fertile, facing the sea with its back to the mountains. It is well suited to the cultivation of the five grains, and they are good at tilling and planting. The people are simple and direct, strong and brave. Having few oxen and horses, they are adept at fighting on foot, wielding spears.

— Records of the Three Kingdoms

Knowledge of Okjeo culture is fragmentary. As with the Dongye and Okjeo's language, food, clothing, architecture, and customs were similar to that of Goguryeo. The Okjeo people practised arranged marriage by which the child-bride lived with the child-groom's family until adulthood, and they interred the dead of a family in a single coffin.

== Language ==
Okjeo
- Okchŏ
- 옥저
- Native to: Okjeo
- Region: Korea
- Era: 250 BC – 500 AD
- Language family: Koreanic?: Puyŏ; Okjeo

Language codes
- ISO 639-3: None (mis)
- Glottolog: None
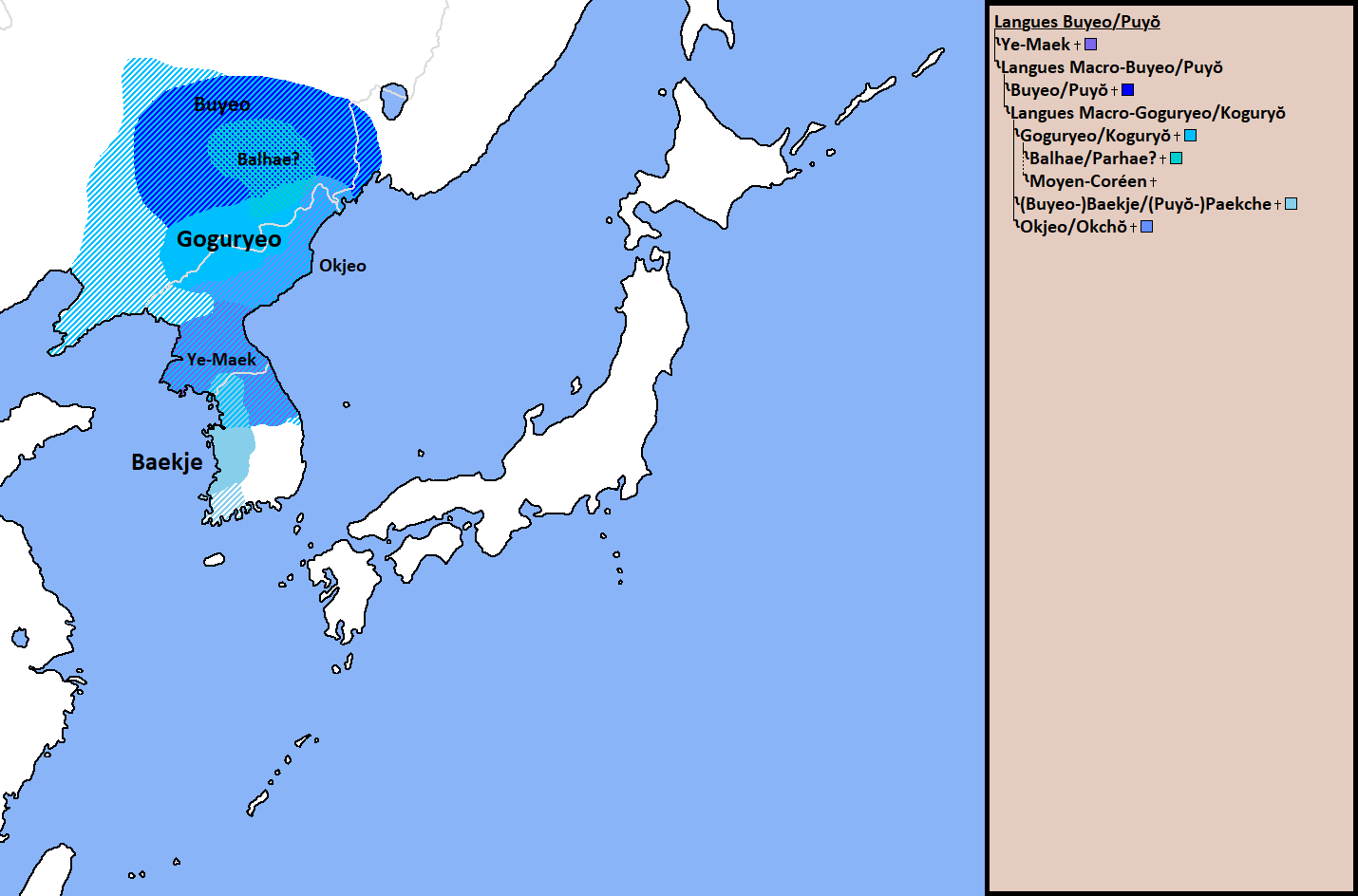
- Map of the Buyeo languages, including Okjeo Buyeo Goguryeo Balhae Okjeo Ye-Maek Baekje

Okjeo was a presumed ancient language that was a part of the Puyŏ languages and existed from the 2nd century BC to the 5th century AD. In Peter H. Lee's book, he stated that although there are some small differences between Okjeo and Goguryeo, the two languages have many similarities that Okjeo did not have with the other Puyŏ languages. However, Christopher I. Beckwith considers Okjeo to have been a dialect of Goguryeo.

== Gallery ==
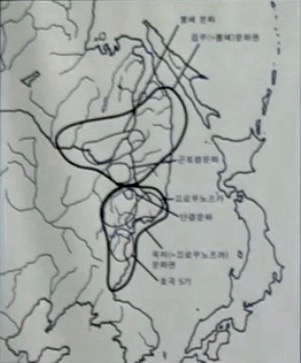
Okjeo and Yilou 1 BCE to 1 CE

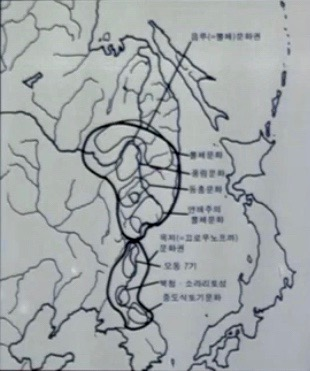
Okjeo and Yilou 2 CE to 3 CE

== See also ==
- Okjeo language
- History of Korea
- Dongye
- Buyeo
- Goguryeo
