= Samhan =

Period of Korean history

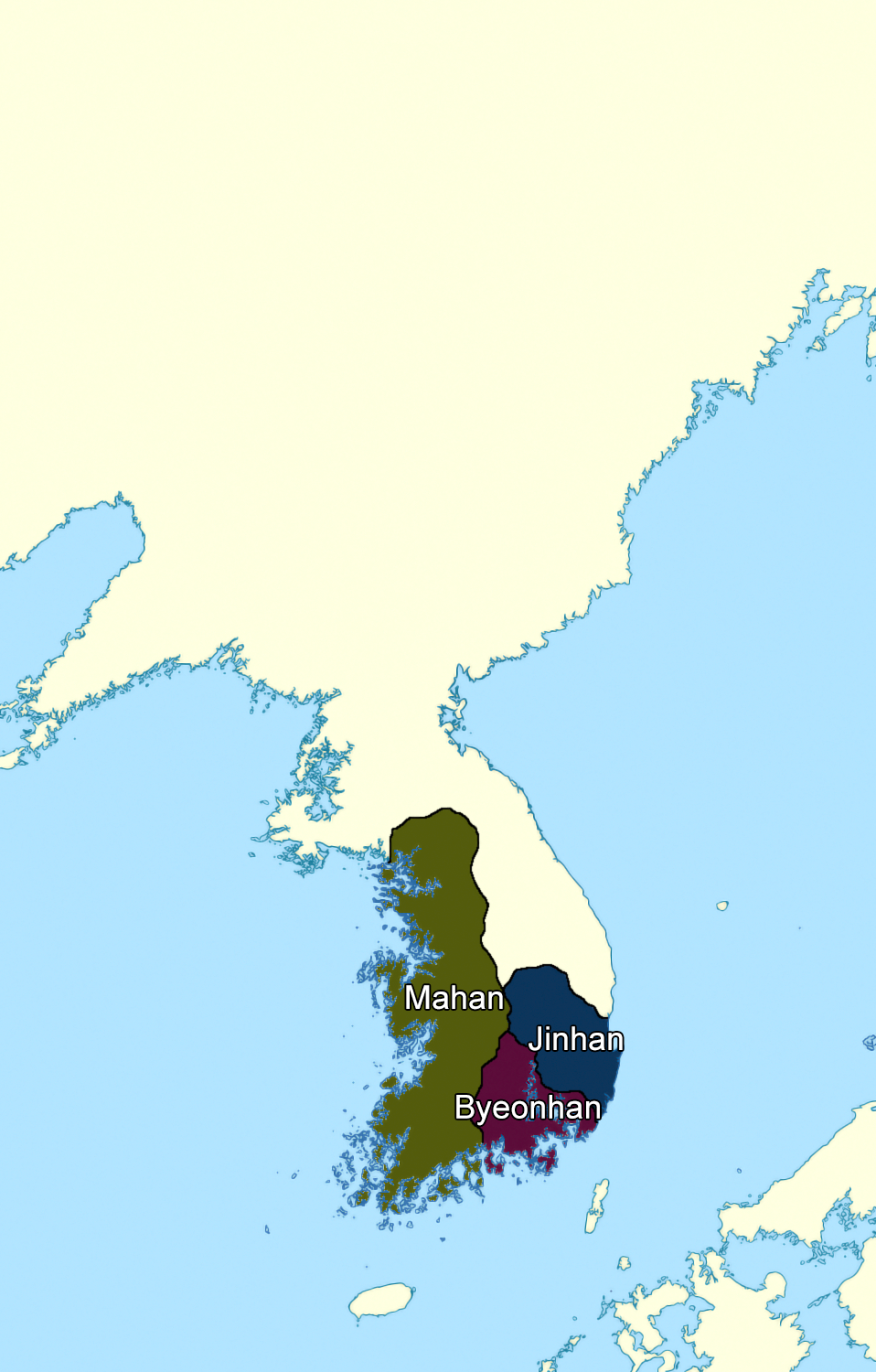
- Map of the approximate locations of the confederacies Map of Mahan confederacy Map of Byeonhan confederacy Map of Jinhan confederacy

Korean name
- Hangul: 삼한
- Hanja: 三韓
- RR: Samhan
- MR: Samhan

Samhan, or Three Hans (Korean: 삼한; Hanja: 三韓), is the collective name of the three confederacies: Byeonhan, Jinhan, and Mahan that emerged in the first century BCE during the Proto–Three Kingdoms of Korea, or Samhan, period. Located in the central and southern regions of the Korean Peninsula, the Samhan confederacies eventually merged and developed into the Paekche, Silla kingdoms and Kaya confederacy. The name "Samhan" also refers to the Three Kingdoms of Korea.

== History ==
The Samhan are thought to have formed around the time of the fall of Old Chosŏn in northern Korea in 108 BCE. Kim Pusik's Samguk sagi, one of the two representative history books of Korea, mentions that people of Jin Han are migrants from Old Chosŏn, which suggests that early Han tribes who came to Southern Korean peninsula are originally Old Chosŏn people; this coincides with the state of Jin in southern Korea also disappearing from written records. By the 4th century, Mahan was fully absorbed into the Paekche kingdom, Jinhan into the Silla kingdom, and Byeonhan into the Kaya confederacy, which was later annexed by Silla.

Beginning in the 7th century, the name "Samhan" became synonymous with the Three Kingdoms of Korea. The "Han" in the names of the Korean Empire, Daehan Jeguk, and the Republic of Korea (South Korea), Daehan Minguk or Hanguk, are named in reference to the Three Kingdoms of Korea, not the ancient confederacies in the southern Korean Peninsula.

In 1897, Gojong changed the name of Joseon to the Korean Empire, Daehan Jeguk, in reference to the Three Kingdoms of Korea. In 1919, the provisional government in exile during the Japanese occupation declared the name of Korea as the Republic of Korea, Daehan Minguk, also in reference to the Three Kingdoms of Korea.

According to the Samguk sagi and Samguk yusa, Silla implemented a national policy, "Samhan Unification" (삼한일통; 三韓一統), to integrate Paekche and Goguryeo refugees. In 1982, a memorial stone dating back to 686 was discovered in Cheongju with an inscription: "The Three Han were unified and the domain was expanded." During the Later Silla period, the concepts of Samhan as the ancient confederacies and the Three Kingdoms of Korea were merged. In a letter to an imperial tutor of the Tang dynasty, Ch'oe Ch'i-wŏn equated Byeonhan to Paekche, Jinhan to Silla, and Mahan to Goguryeo. By the Goryeo period, Samhan became a common name to refer to all of Korea. In his Ten Mandates to his descendants, Wang Geon declared that he had unified the Three Han (Samhan), referring to the Three Kingdoms of Korea. Samhan continued to be a common name for Korea during the Joseon period and was widely referenced in the Annals of the Joseon Dynasty.

In China, the Three Kingdoms of Korea were collectively called Samhan since the beginning of the 7th century. The use of the name Samhan to indicate the Three Kingdoms of Korea was widespread in the Tang dynasty. Goguryeo was alternately called Mahan by the Tang dynasty, as evidenced by a Tang document that called Goguryeo generals "Mahan leaders" (마한추장; 馬韓酋長) in 645. In 651, Emperor Gaozong of Tang sent a message to the king of Paekche referring to the Three Kingdoms of Korea as Samhan. Epitaphs of the Tang dynasty, including those belonging to Paekche, Goguryeo, and Silla refugees and migrants, called the Three Kingdoms of Korea "Samhan", especially Goguryeo. For example, the epitaph of Go Hyeon (고현; 高玄), a Tang dynasty general of Goguryeo origin who died in 690, calls him a "Liaodong Samhan man" (요동 삼한인; 遼東 三韓人). The History of Liao equates Byeonhan to Silla, Jinhan to Buyeo, and Mahan to Goguryeo.

In Japan, Samhan is read as "Sankan (さんかん)" but unlike Korea and China, it is synonymous with the Three Kingdoms and not just the Samhan confederacies as seen in the Invasion of the Three Koreas (三韓征伐; Sankan Seibatsu). The invasion is commonly regarded as the Silla–Wa War which could posit the idea that the use of "Han" in Japan was already analogous with the Korean (韓) identity throughout its history as they often amalgamated Samhan with the Three Kingdoms despite certain polities such as Byeonhan (later Kaya) and Goguryeo (from Buyeo) lacking any direct connection.

== Etymology ==
"Samhan" became a name for the Three Kingdoms of Korea beginning in the 7th century.

Sam (三) is a Sino-Korean word meaning "three" and Han (한) is a Korean word meaning "great (one), grand, large, much, many". Han was transliterated into Chinese characters 韓, 漢, 幹, or 刊, but is believed by foreign linguists to be unrelated to the Han in Han Chinese and the Chinese kingdoms and dynasties also called Han (漢) and Han (韓). The word Han is still found in many Korean words such as Hangawi (한가위) — archaic native Korean for Chuseok (秋夕, 추석), Hangaram (한가람) — archaic native Korean for Hangang (漢江, 한강), Hanbat (한밭) — the original place name in native Korean for Daejeon (大田, 대전), hanabi (하나비) — a Joseon-era (Late Middle Korean) word for "grandfather; elderly man" (most often 할아버지 harabeoji in present-day Korean, although speakers of some dialects, especially in North Korea, may still use the form hanabi). Ma means south, Byeon means shining and Jin means east.

Many historians have suggested that the word Han might have been pronounced as Gan or Kan. The Silla language had a usage of this word for king or ruler as found in the words 마립간 (麻立干; Maripgan) and 거서간 / 거슬한 (居西干 / 居瑟邯; Geoseogan / Geoseulhan). Alexander Vovin suggests this word is related to the Mongolian Khan and Manchurian Han meaning ruler, and the ultimate origin is Xiongnu and Yeniseian.

== Three Hans ==
The Samhan are generally considered loose confederations of walled-town states. Each appears to have had a ruling elite, whose power was a mix of politics and shamanism. Although each state appears to have had its own ruler, there is no evidence of systematic succession.

The name of the poorly understood Jin state continued to be used in the name of the Jinhan confederacy and in the name "Byeonjin," an alternate term for Byeonhan. In addition, for some time the leader of Mahan continued to call himself the King of Jin, asserting nominal overlordship over all of the Samhan confederations.

Mahan was the largest and earliest developed of the three confederacies. It consisted of 54 minor statelets, one of which conquered or absorbed the others and became the center of the Paekche Kingdom. Mahan is usually considered to have been located in the southwest of the Korean peninsula, covering Jeolla, Chungcheong, and portions of Gyeonggi.

Jinhan consisted of 12 statelets, one of which conquered or absorbed the others and became the center of the Silla Kingdom. It is usually considered to have been located to the east of the Nakdong River valley.

Byeonhan consisted of 12 statelets, which later gave rise to the Kaya confederacy, subsequently annexed by Silla. It is usually considered to have been located in the south and west of the Nakdong River valley.

== Geography ==
The exact locations occupied by the different Samhan confederations are disputed. It is also quite likely that their boundaries changed over time. Samguk sagi indicates that Mahan was located in the northern region later occupied by Goguryeo, Jinhan in the region later occupied by Silla, and Byeonhan in the southwestern region later occupied by Paekche. However, the earlier Chinese Records of the Three Kingdoms places Mahan in the southwest, Jinhan in the southeast, and Byeonhan between them.

Villages were usually constructed deep in high mountain valleys, where they were relatively secure from attack. Mountain fortresses were also often constructed as places of refuge during war. The minor states which made up the federations are usually considered to have covered about as much land as a modern-day myeon, or township.

Based on historical and archeological records, river and sea routes appear to have been the primary means of long-distance transportation and trade (Yi, 2001, p. 246). It is thus not surprising that Jinhan and Byeonhan, with their coastal and river locations, became particularly prominent in international trade during this time.

== Languages ==
One of the most prominent leaders of the Han (Korean: 한; 韓) Immigration was King Jun of Old Chosŏn from the northern Korea, having lost the throne to Wiman, fled to the state of Jin in southern Korea around 194–180 BCE. He and his followers established Mahan which was one of the Samhan ("Three Hans"), along with Byeonhan and Jinhan. Further Han(韓) migration followed the fall of Old Chosŏn and establishment of the Chinese commanderies in 108 BCE.

The Samhan languages (Korean: 삼한어; 三韓語) were a branch of the ancient Koreanic languages, referring to the non-Buyeo Koreanic languages, once spoken in the southern Korean Peninsula, which were closely related to the Buyeo languages.

The Samhan languages were spoken in the Mahan, Byeonhan and Jinhan. The extent of Han languages is unclear. It is generally accepted as including Sillan, and may also have included the language(s) spoken in Paekche. A number of researchers have suggested that Paekche may have been bilingual, with the ruling class speaking a Puyŏ language and the commoners speaking a Han language.

Linguistic evidence suggests that Japonic languages (see Peninsular Japonic) were spoken in large parts of the southern Korean Peninsula, but its speakers were eventually assimilated by Koreanic-speaking peoples and the languages replaced/supplanted. Evidence also suggests that Peninsular Japonic and Koreanic languages co-existed in the southern Korean Peninsula for an extended period of time and influenced each other. As has been suggested for the later Korean kingdom of Paekche, it is possible that the Samhan states were bilingual prior to the complete replacement of Peninsular Japonic by Koreanic languages.

== Technology ==
The Samhan saw the systematic introduction of iron into the southern Korean peninsula. This was taken up with particular intensity by the Byeonhan states of the Nakdong River valley, which manufactured and exported iron armor and weapons throughout Northeast Asia.

The introduction of iron technology also facilitated growth in agriculture, as iron tools made the clearing and cultivation of land much easier. It appears that at this time the modern-day Jeolla area emerged as a center of rice production (Kim, 1974).

== Relations ==
Until the rise of Goguryeo, the external relations of Samhan were largely limited to the Chinese commanderies located in the former territory of Old Chosŏn. The longest standing of these, the Lelang commandery, appear to have maintained separate diplomatic relations with each individual state rather than with the heads of the confederacies as such.

In the beginning, the relationship was a political trading system in which "tribute" was exchanged for titles or prestige gifts. Official seals identified each tribal leader's authority to trade with the commandery. However, after the fall of the Kingdom of Wei in the 3rd century, San guo zhi reports that the Lelang commandery handed out official seals freely to local commoners, no longer symbolizing political authority (Yi, 2001, p. 245).

The Chinese commanderies also supplied luxury goods and consumed local products. Later Han dynasty coins and beads are found throughout the Korean peninsula. These were exchanged for local iron or raw silk. After the 2nd century CE, as Chinese influence waned, iron ingots came into use as currency for the trade based around Jinhan and Byeonhan.

Trade relations also existed with the emergent states of Japan at this time, most commonly involving the exchange of ornamental Japanese bronzeware for Korean iron. These trade relations shifted in the 3rd century, when the Yamatai federation of Kyūshū gained monopolistic control over Japanese trade with Byeonhan.

== See also ==
- Samhan people
- History of Korea
- Names of Korea
- Han languages
- Three Confederate States of Old Chosŏn
