= Baekje language =

Language of Baekje

Baekje
- Paekche
- Native to: Paekche
- Region: Korea
- Era: 4th–7th centuries
- Language family: Koreanic: Baekje

Language codes
- ISO 639-3: Either: pkc – Paekche xpp – Puyo-Paekche
- Glottolog: paek1234
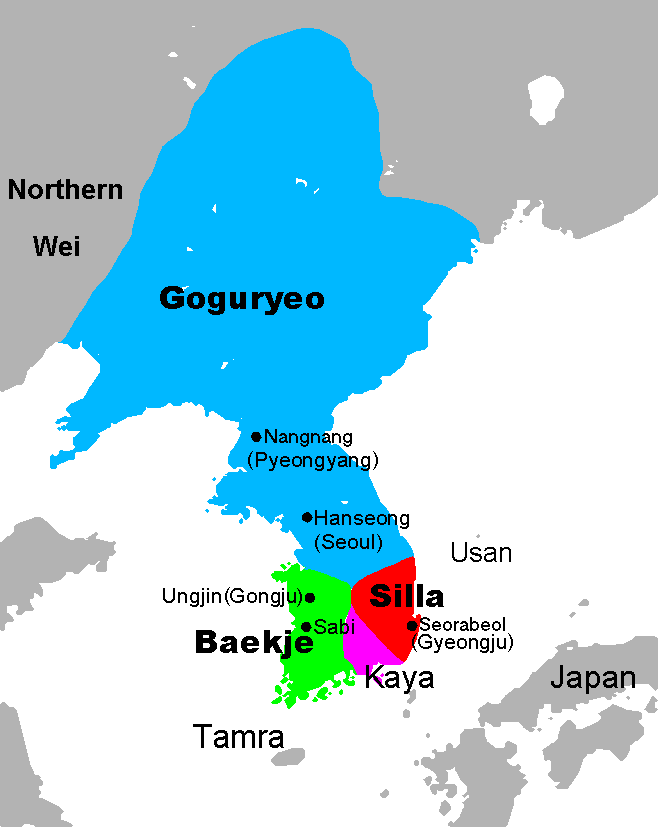
- The Three Kingdoms of Korea, with Baekje in green.

The language of the kingdom of Baekje (4th–7th centuries), one of the Three Kingdoms of Korea, is poorly attested, and scholars differ on whether one or two languages were used. However, at least some of the material appears to be a variety of Old Korean.

== Description in early texts ==
Baekje was preceded in southwestern Korea by the Mahan confederacy. The Chinese Records of the Three Kingdoms (3rd century) states that the Mahan language differed from that of Goguryeo to the north and the other Samhan ('Three Han') to the east, Byeonhan and Jinhan, whose languages were said to resemble each other. However, the Book of the Later Han (5th century) speaks of differences between the languages of Byeonhan and Jinhan.

Historians believe that Baekje was established by immigrants from Goguryeo who took over Mahan, while Byeonhan and Jinhan were succeeded by Gaya and Silla respectively. According to Book of Liang (635), the language of Baekje was similar to that of Goguryeo. Chapter 49 of the Book of Zhou (636) says of Baekje:

王姓夫餘氏，號於羅瑕，民呼為鞬吉支，夏言竝王也。
The king belongs to the Puyŏ clan; the gentry call him 於羅瑕; commoners call him 鞬吉支. In Chinese it means 'king'.

Based in this passage and some Baekje words cited in the Japanese history Nihon Shoki (720), many scholars, beginning with Kōno Rokurō and later Kim Bang-han, have argued that the kingdom of Baekje was bilingual, with the gentry speaking a Puyŏ language and the common people a Han language. The Linguist List defined two codes for these languages, and these have been taken over into the ISO 639-3 registry.

== Linguistic data ==
There are no extant texts in the Baekje language. The primary contemporary lexical evidence comes from a few glosses in Chinese and Japanese histories, as well as proposed etymologies for old place names.

=== Nihon Shoki ===
The Japanese history Nihon Shoki, compiled in the early 8th century from earlier documents, including some from Baekje, records 42 Baekje words. These are transcribed as Old Japanese syllables, which are restricted to the form (C)V, limiting the precision of the transcription.

Family and society words from the Nihon Shoki
Gloss	Transcription	Comparison		
Gloss	Transcription	Old Japanese	Middle Korean (Note: Forms are transcribed using the Yale romanization of Korean, which is standard in works on the history of Korean. The pitch accent is marked with an acute accent on high-pitched syllables. Rising pitch (ǒ) implies an earlier disyllabic form.)	Tungusic
ruler	ki_{1}si	ki_{1}si 'envoy' (Note: The Old Japanese word may be a loan from Silla.)		
king	orikoke			
queen	oruku		el-Gǐ-l 'mate with'	
consort	siso orikuku		el-Gǐ-l 'mate with'	
main wife	makari orikuku	makar- 'entrust'	el-Gǐ-l 'mate with'	
second wife	kuno orikuku		el-Gǐ-l 'mate with'	
imperial consort	pasikasi		pěs 'companion' + kas 'wife'	
low consort	epasito		pěs 'companion'	
prince	sesimu		sonahi 'male'	
upper minister	makari daro	makar- 'entrust'		
master	nirimu		nǐm 'master'	
father	kaso_{2}	kaso_{2} 'father'		
mother	omo_{2}	omo_{2} 'mother'	eme-ním 'mother'	Manchu eme 'mother'
child	yomo			Manchu jui 'son'
heir	makari yomo	makar- 'entrust'		
Koryo	koku			
Koryo	kokusori			
walled city	ki_{2}	ki_{2} 'fortress'		
walled city	sasi		cás 'walled city'	
district	ko_{2}po_{2}ri	ko_{2}po_{2}ri 'district'	kwoúl, kwowólh < *kopor 'county seat, district'	
village	pure			
village	suki_{1}		súkoWol 'country'	
village chief	sukuri			

Other words from the Nihon Shoki
Gloss	Transcription	Comparison		
Gloss	Transcription	Old Japanese	Middle Korean	Tungusic
above, north	okosi	oko_{2}s- 'raise, get up'	wuh 'top'	*ugi- 'top'
bear	kuma	kuma 'bear'	kwǒm 'bear'	
below	arusi/arosi		aláy 'below'	
belt	sitoro		stúy 'belt'	
burden	no_{2}	no_{2}- 'burden'		
falcon	kuti	kuti 'hawk'		
ford	nuri		nolo 'ferry'	
good	wire	wiya 'polite'		
interpret	wosa	wosa 'interpreter'		
island	sema	sima 'island, territory'	syěm 'island'	
large	ko_{2}ni		ha- 'many, great', khu- 'big'	
lower	oto_{2}	oto_{2} 'younger'		
middle	siso		sús 'between'	
mountain	mure		mworwó 'mountain, ridge'	*mulu 'ridge'
outside	poka	poka 'outside, other'	pask 'outside'	
south	aripisi		alph 'front'	
storehouse	pesu			Manchu fise 'shed'
stream	nare/nari		nǎyh 'stream'	*niaru 'lake, swamp'
upper	soku			

Early Japan imported many artifacts from Baekje and the Gaya confederacy, and several of the above matching Old Japanese forms are believed to have been borrowed from Baekje at that time. Such borrowing would also explain the fact that words such as kaso_{2} 'father', ki_{2} 'fortress', ko_{2}po_{2}ri 'district' and kuti 'hawk' are limited to Western Old Japanese, with no cognates in Eastern Old Japanese or Ryukyuan languages. Moreover, for some words, like 'father' and 'mother', there are alternative words in Old Japanese that are attested across the Japonic family (titi and papa respectively). Bentley lists these words, as well as kuma 'bear' and suki_{2} 'village', as loans into Old Japanese from Baekje. Alexander Vovin argues that the only Baekje words from the Nihon Shoki found throughout Japonic, such as sema 'island' and kuma 'bear', are those also common to Koreanic.

=== Other histories ===
The Middle Korean text Yongbieocheonga transcribes the name of the old Baekje capital 'Bear Ford' as kwomá nolo, closely matching two of the words from the Nihon Shoki.

Chapter 49 of the Chinese Book of Zhou (636) cites three Baekje words: (Note: Names represented phonetically with Chinese characters are transcribed using William H. Baxter's transcription for Middle Chinese.)

- ʔyo-la-hae (於羅瑕) 'king' (used by the gentry)
- kjon-kjit-tsye (鞬吉支) 'king' (used by commoners)
- ʔyo-ljuwk (於陸) 'queen'

These may be the same words as orikoke 'king', ki_{1}si 'ruler' and oruku 'queen' respectively, found in the Nihon Shoki.

Chapter 54 of the Book of Liang (635) gives four Baekje words:

- ku^{H}-mae (固麻) 'ruling fortress'
- yem-lu^{X} (檐魯) 'settlement'
- pjuwk-syaem (複衫) 'short jacket'
- kwon (褌) 'pants'

None of these have Koreanic etymologies, but Vovin suggests that the first might be cognate with Old Japanese ko_{2}me_{2} 'enclose', and the second with Old Japanese ya 'house' + maro_{2} 'circle'. He views this as limited evidence for Kōno's two-language hypothesis, and suggests that the language of the commoners may have been the same Peninsular Japonic language reflected by placename glosses in the Samguk sagi from the northern part of Baekje captured by Goguryeo in the 5th century.

The Baekje placenames in chapter 37 of the Samguk sagi are not glossed, but several of them include the form 夫里 pju-li^{X}, which has been compared with later Korean pul 'plain'.

=== Wooden tablets ===
Wooden tablets dated to the late Baekje era have been discovered by archaeologists, and some of them involve the rearrangement of Classical Chinese words according to native syntax. From this data, the word order of Baekje appears to have been similar to that of Old Korean. Unlike in Silla texts, however, no uncontroversial evidence of non-Chinese grammatical morphemes has been found. Compared to Silla tablets, Baekje tablets are far more likely to employ conventional Classical Chinese syntax and vocabulary without any native influence.

The tablets also give the names of 12 locations and 77 individuals. A total of 147 phonographic characters have been identified from these proper nouns, but this is insufficient to allow a reconstruction of the phonology.

Lee Seungjae suggests that a tablet found in the Baekje-built temple of Mireuksa, originally thought to be a list of personal names, appears to record native numerals, possibly a series of dates, using phonograms (both phonetically and semantically adapted). Although the tablet is dated to the early Later Silla period, postdating the 660 fall of Baekje, its orthography differs from conventional Old Korean orthography. In the extant Silla texts, a native numeral is written by a logogram-phonogram sequence. The numerals appear Koreanic, with a suffix *-(ə)p that may be cognate to the Early Middle Korean ordinal suffix *-m. (Note: The character 𢀳 is visually similar to and likely based on 邑.)

Potential Baekje numerals
Number	Wooden tablet word	Reconstruction	Middle Korean
one	伽第	*gadəp (Note: Compare Old Korean 一等 *HAton 'one'.)	honáh
two	矣毛	*iterəp (Note: Compare Middle Korean ithul 'two days'.)	twǔlh
three	新台	*saidəp	sěyh
five	刀士	*tasəp	tasós
seven	日古	*nirkop	nilkwúp
seven	二[?]口 (Note: The second character is illegible.)	*ni[?]kup	nilkwúp
eight	今毛	*jeterəp	yetúlp
eight	[以?]如 (Note: The identity of the first character is uncertain because the bottom half is illegible.)	*[je?]təp	yetúlp

== See also ==
- History of the Korean language
- Old Korean
- Goguryeo language
