= Jinhan confederacy =

Ancient chiefdoms in Korea

Jinhan confederacy 辰韓 진한
- 2nd century BCE–4th century CE
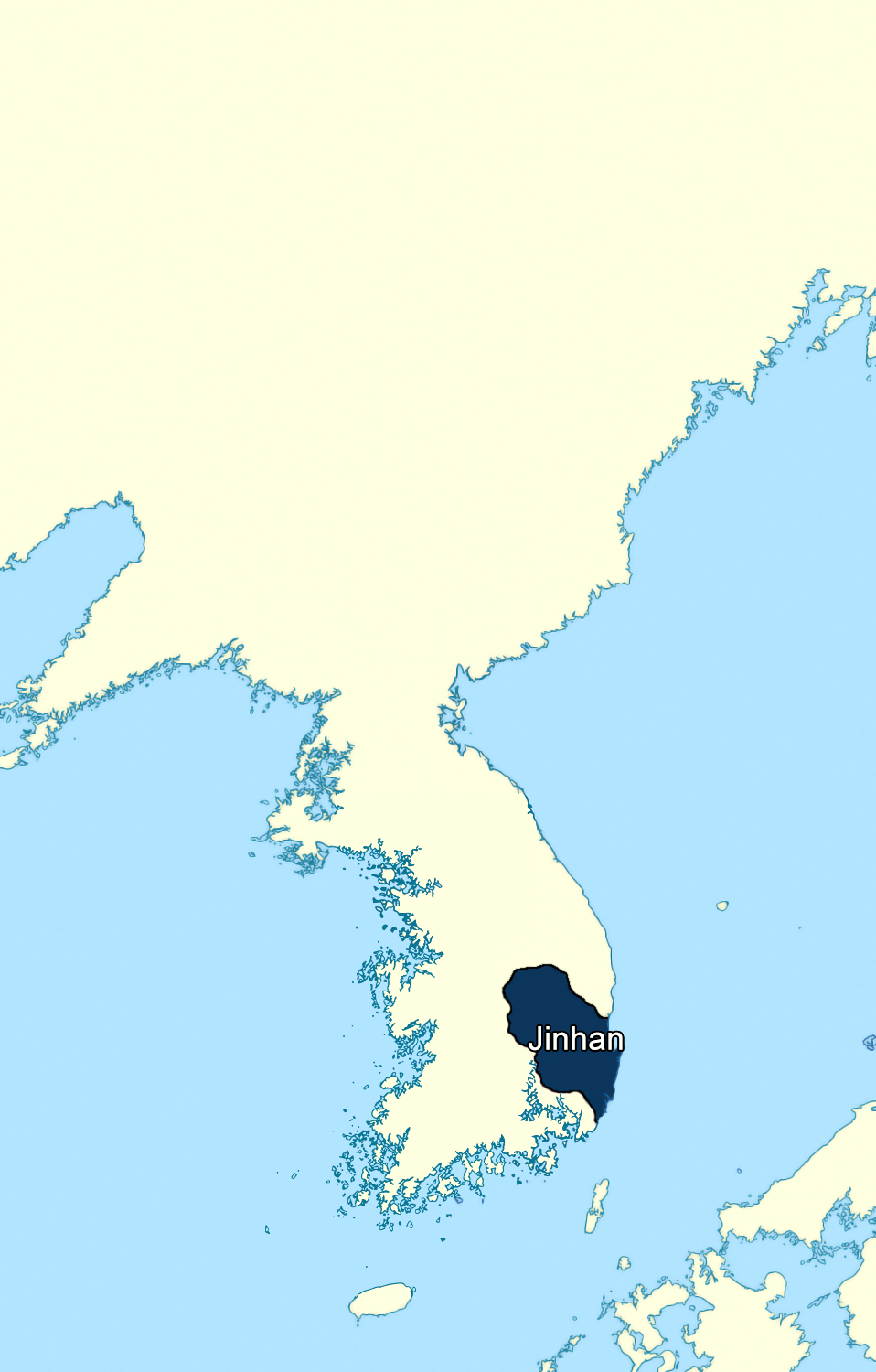
- Jinhan confederacy in c. 1 CE
- Common languages: Han, possibly Peninsular Japonic
- Ethnic groups: Samhan people, Yemaek, possibly Yayoi people
- Religion: Musok, possibly Koshinto
- Government: Confederacy
- Historical era: Ancient
  - Establishment: 2nd century BCE
  - Submission to Silla: 4th century CE
| Preceded by | Succeeded by |
| Jin (Korean state) | Silla |
- Today part of: South Korea

Korean name
- Hangul: 진한
- Hanja: 辰韓
- RR: Jinhan
- MR: Chinhan
- IPA: [tɕin.ɦan]

Jinhan (Korean: 진한; Hanja: 辰韓) was a loose confederacy of chiefdoms that existed from around the 1st century BCE to the 4th century CE in the southern Korean peninsula, to the east of the Nakdong River valley, Gyeongsang Province. Jinhan was one of the Samhan (or "Three Hans"), along with Byeonhan and Mahan. Apparently descending from the Jin state of southern Korea, Jinhan was absorbed by the later Silla, one of the Three Kingdoms of Korea.

== Etymology ==
"Jinhan (辰韓)" is believed to be a combination of Old Korean words. "Jin (진)" in native Korean meant "East" while "Han (한)" meant "big", giving the meaning of Jinhan, the "Big Nation of the East".

As part of the Samhan, Mahan meant "Big Nation of the South" and Byeonhan meant "Big Nation of Shimmer".

== History ==
Jinhan, like the other Samhan confederacies, arose out of the confusion and migration following the fall of Wiman Joseon in 108 BCE. Thus, Jinhan's 12 countries are records of quasi-independent countries that have weakened since the defeat of Silla during the Cheomhae Isageum era.

Before the 3rd century, it was presumed that there was no distinction between the Jinhan (辰韓) and Byeonhan (弁韓 or 弁辰). It is said that the people of Jinhan and Byeonhan intermingled and immigrated quite frequently (雜居), ultimately making it difficult to differentiate the two states culturally.

Book of Wei - Volume 30's some part are record left by Wei envoy who visited Okjeo and Jinhan after the victory of the Goguryeo–Wei War and the Battle of Giryeong at the late 3rd century.

The same book also comments on the people of Jinhan, citing that they had tattoos and looked similar to the people of Wa.

『弁辰與辰韓雜居，城郭衣服皆同，言語風俗有異。其人形皆長大，美髮，衣服絜清。而刑法嚴峻。其國近倭，故頗有文身者。』

"Byeonhan and Jinhan people live together with their clothes within the cities being the same. However, their customs and languages differ. They are tall, have beautiful hair, and wear neat clothes. They are also strict on laws. They are close to Wa and they all have tattoos."

— Book of the Later Han

The Book of the Later Han also states similar observations, commenting that the people of Jinhan being physically attractive and having tattoos like the people of Wa.

=== Misconceptions ===
A claim found in the Chinese chronicle, Records of the Three Kingdoms states that an elderly man spoke about refugees from the Lelang area founding Jinhan after political turmoil of the Qin dynasty at the end of the 3rd century BCE and carried over the name "Qin/秦". This claim is parroted by other Chinese books that were published later such as the History of the Northern Dynasties, and the Book of Liang, all using the same elderly man as their source.

However, due to the dates of the Qin dynasty (221–206 BCE) overlapping with the Jin state (4th–2nd century BCE) and no historical documents from Korea backing this claim, it is mostly regarded as a false rumor. Historically, the Samhan kingdoms, including Jinhan (辰韓), specifically claimed successorship over Jin state (辰國) and not the Qin dynasty (秦朝). It is also noted that the claim found in the annals allude to a random mention made by an elderly passerby (耆老) of no social importance or recognizable identity, and is believed to be an attempt of Sinicization on the grounds of phonetic similarities. In actuality, the word "Jin" meant "East" in native Korean and have no Sino-Tibetan roots at all. Similar attempt can be found with Mahan and Jizi (see Mahan confederacy's misconceptions).

The claim is further discredited as Korea's 12th century Samguk sagi states that the first king of Silla (the kingdom that succeeded Jinhan) built the kingdom alongside refugees from Old Chosŏn.

『先是、朝鮮遺民分居山谷之間、爲六村、一曰閼川楊山村、二曰突山髙墟村、三曰觜山珍支村 或云干珍村、四曰茂山大樹村、五曰金山加利村、六曰明活山髙耶村、是爲辰韓六部。』

"In the beginning, there were six villages inhabited by the refugee Chosŏn (Korean) people within the valley; Alch'ŏn of Yangsan, Tolsan of Kohŏ, Ch'wisan of Chinji (or Kanjin), Musan of Taesu, Kŭmsan of Kari, and Myŏnghwalsan of Koya. These were known as the 'Six villages of Jinhan'."

— Samguk sagi

Such misconception had ultimately affected immigrants who hailed from Silla to Japan known as the Hata clan who were wrongfully labeled as descendants of the Qin dynasty simply for being associated with Silla (Jinhan). Japanese scholars such as Mitsuo Inoue (井上 満郎), Kunio Hirano (平野 邦雄), Masaaki Ueda (上田 正昭), and Kōjirō Naoki (直木 孝次郎), while studying about the origins of the Hata clan, criticized the claims found within the Chinese chronicle, calling it a "fabrication invented by the Chinese". The misconception's long-lasting effect is deemed negatively by modern Japanese and Korean scholars alike today. (Note: 『秦の徐福が海外に派遣されたことは当時の中国王朝の文献によく言及されるほど有名な物語であって、徐福は実際に海外にはたどり着けなかったものの、物語が誤伝され辰韓は発音が似た秦韓に間違えて呼ばれていたという。』 "The story of Xu Fu of the Qin dynasty being sent overseas is so well-known that it is often mentioned in documents from the Chinese dynasties of the time. Although Xu Fu never actually reached overseas, the story was misinterpreted and Jinhan was mistakenly called 'Qinhan', which has a similar pronunciation.")

== Culture ==
Its relation to the earlier state of Jin is not clear, although the contemporary Chinese chronicle Records of the Three Kingdoms alleges that Jinhan was identical with Jin (while another record describes Jin as the predecessor of the Samhan as a whole). Jinhan and Byeonhan shared essentially the same culture, with varying religious customs, and apparently were not separated by a clear boundary.

Many of the archeological evidence found in the area lack distinguishable differences with the evidence found in the neighboring kingdoms, suggesting that the cultures were mostly similar across the southern part of the peninsula.

Little is known about the daily lives of the Jinhan people. The religion appears to have been shamanistic which played an important role in politics as well. Agriculture was heavily dominated by rice, but also included substantial rearing of livestock including horses, cattle, and chickens.

Similar to Byeonhan, infants born in Jinhan were made flat headed by pushing their skulls onto a flat rock. This practice is thought to have lasted up to the Gaya confederacy.

== Language ==
The language of Jinhan is thought to be the predecessor of the language of Silla, which in turn was the supposed ancestor of the modern Korean language.

Due to multiple evidence stating that Silla, Baekje and Goguryeo spoke similar languages without a need of a translator, it can be deduced that the languages spoken in Jinhan bore close resemblance to languages spoken in countries such as Byeonhan and Mahan at the time.

However, the ancient Book of Wei and Book of the Later Han provide conflicting testimonies that may contradict the previous claims.

== Statelets ==
According to the Records of the Three Kingdoms, Jinhan consisted of 12 statelets of 600 to 5000 families each divided from 6 statelets:

- Saro (사로국, 斯盧國), most powerful state in Jinhan, it is also called Seorabeol. In 503, Saro state renamed itself "Silla".
- Gijeo (기저국, 己柢國), present-day Andong.
- Bulsa (불사국, 不斯國), present-day Changnyeong.
- Geun-gi (근기국, 勤耆國), present-day Pohang or Cheongdo.
- Nanmirimidong (난미리미동국, 難彌理彌凍國), present-day Miryang. It is also called "Mirimidong".
- Yeomhae (염해국, 冉奚國), present-day Ulsan.
- Gunmi (군미국, 軍彌國), present-day Sacheon.
- Yeodam (여담국, 如湛國), present-day Gunwi.
- Horo (호로국, 戶路國), present-day Sangju.
- Juseon (주선국, 州鮮國), present-day Gyeongsan.
- Mayeon (마연국, 馬延國), present-day Miryang.
- U-yu (우유국, 優由國), present-day Cheongdo or Yeongdeok.

According to Samguk Sagi, the Silla Kingdom (around present-day Gyeongju), was founded by Bak Hyeokgeose in 57 BCE, who united the six clans of Jinhan under his rule. The records are sparse and conflicting regarding the relationship of the names Jinhan, Saro, Seorabeol, and the later Silla kingdom.

== Location ==
Most theories indicate that Jinhan was located in the area later occupied by the Silla kingdom: the Gyeongju Basin and adjacent Sea of Japan coast. It would have been neighbored by the Byeonhan confederacy on the southwest, and by the much larger Mahan confederacy on the west. On the north it would have been bounded by the Chinese commanderies and the small coastal state of Dongye. However, some scholars place Jinhan in the Han River valley, bounded by Mahan on the north and Byeonhan on the south.
