= Christopher I. Beckwith =

American linguist

- Born: October 23, 1945 (age 80)
- Occupations: Philologist, linguist

Academic work
- Institutions: Indiana University Bloomington
- Main interests: Central Eurasian studies

Christopher I. Beckwith (born October 23, 1945) is an American philologist and distinguished professor in the Department of Central Eurasian Studies at Indiana University Bloomington, Indiana.

He has a Bachelor of Arts in Chinese from Ohio State University (1968), a Master of Arts in Tibetan from Indiana University Bloomington (1974) and a Doctor of Philosophy in Inner Asian Studies from Indiana University (1977).

Beckwith, a MacArthur Fellow, is a researcher in the field of Central Eurasian studies. He researches the history and cultures of ancient and medieval Central Asia. Concomitantly he specializes in Asian language studies and linguistics, and in the history of Central Eurasia. He teaches Old Tibetan, Central Eurasian languages, and Central Eurasian history and researches the linguistics of Aramaic, Chinese, Japanese, Koguryo, Old Tibetan, Tokharian, Old Turkic, Uzbek, and other languages.

== Empires of the Silk Road ==
Empires of the Silk Road, published in 2009, is a wide-ranging history of Central Eurasia that argues that instead of a land of barbarians, Central Eurasia was the core of civilization. In a review in the Journal of the American Oriental Society, Doug Hitch wrote that "the strong points in this book are often overshadowed by glaring flaws." He notes that it covers the most important historical points well and benefits from a lengthy bibliography and index, but has fewer maps than would be beneficial for textbook use. Furthermore, "it contains a great number of idiosyncratic views, many of which will likely be rejected by mainstream scholarship, and it should be read skeptically." A review in The Journal of Indo-European Studies was also somewhat critical, praising the depth of the book but noting that he misses important architectural literature and that the book can be hard to follow.

== Reception and criticism ==
His best-known works include Greek Buddha: Pyrrho's Encounter with Early Buddhism in Central Asia and Empires of the Silk Road: A History of Central Eurasia from the Bronze Age to the Present. Greek Buddha examines links between very early Buddhism and the philosophy of Pyrrho, an ancient Greek philosopher who accompanied Alexander the Great on his Indian campaign. The book is noted for its challenging and iconoclastic approach to multiple issues in the development of early Buddhism, Pyrrhonism, Daoism, Jainism and the Śramaṇa movement. Empires of the Silk Road is a rethinking of the origins, history, and significance of Central Eurasia. Beckwith's methodologies and interpretations concerning early Buddhism, inscriptions, and archaeological sites have been criticized by other scholars, such as Johannes Bronkhorst, Osmund Bopearachchi, Stephen Batchelor and Charles Goodman. He claims that the Buddha, Laozi, Zoroaster and Anacharsis were Scythians through primarily linguistic reasoning. He rejects the authenticity of historical evidence to the contrary, including the entire Pali Canon and the Avesta, the latter of which he regards as a later interpolation written in an Indic language, questioning the entire field of Iranian historical linguistics. He also disregards archaeological evidence proving that the Buddha was a Shakya from the Himalayan foothills, including a 6th century BC shrine at the birthplace of the Buddha in Lumbini and the Lumbini pillar inscription, instead proposing that he was from Central Asia.

Alexander Vovin, a researcher on East Asian philology, regards Beckwith's proposals on Japanese etymology as "science fiction' Beckwith uses claims of Scythian origin to make the hyperdiffusionist assertion that "Central Eurasia is our homeland, the place where our civilization started", responsible for "founding the Classical civilizations of the Greeks and Romans, Iranians, Indians, and Chinese". Beckwith rejects universally held support for the genetic relationship between Sinitic and Tibeto-Burman languages, instead supporting a link between Indo-European and Sinitic languages In Empires of the Silk Road, Beckwith criticizes Modernism, stating that it has "has eliminated all hierarchies and replaced them with the idea of “equality,” has given birth to an age of “unartists” with the inability to understand the concept of Beauty and the inability to judge between Art and trash." He views Modernism as an opposition to the traditional feudal, heroic culture of the so-called Central Eurasian Cultural Complex. According to Patrick Olivelle, Beckwith's theory about Ashoka is "an outlier and no mainstream Ashokan scholar would subscribe to that view.

== Publications ==
- The Tibetan Empire in Central Asia (1987)
- Medieval Tibeto-Burman Languages Vols I-III, editor (2002, 2006, 2008)
- Koguryo, the Language of Japan's Continental Relatives (2004)
- Phoronyms: Classifiers, Class Nouns, and the Pseudopartitive Construction (2007)
- Warriors of the Cloisters: The Central Asian Origins of Science in the Medieval World (2012)
- Empires of the Silk Road: A History of Central Eurasia from the Bronze Age to the Present (2011)
- Greek Buddha: Pyrrho's Encounter with Early Buddhism in Central Asia (2015)
- The Scythian Empire: Central Eurasia and the Birth of the Classical Age from Persia to China (2023)

== See also ==
- Similarities between Pyrrhonism and Buddhism
