= J. Marshall Unger =

American linguist

James Marshall Unger
- Born: May 28, 1947 (age 79); Cleveland, Ohio, U.S.
- Occupation: Linguist

Academic background
- Education: Yale University
- Thesis: Studies in Early Japanese Morphophonemics (1975)
- Doctoral advisor: Samuel E. Martin

Academic work
- Institutions: Ohio State University, University of Hawaiʻi at Mānoa, University of Maryland
- Main interests: Historical linguistics, Japanese studies

James Marshall Unger (born May 28, 1947, in Cleveland, Ohio) is emeritus professor of Japanese at the Ohio State University. He specializes in historical linguistics and the writing systems of East Asia, but he has also published on Japanese mathematics of the Edo period.

He chaired academic departments at the University of Hawaiʻi at Mānoa, University of Maryland, and the Ohio State University from 1988 to 2004 and has been a visiting professor/researcher at Kōbe University, Tsukuba University, the University of Tōkyō, the National Museum for Ethnography in Senri, and the National Institute for Japanese Language and Linguistics (NINJAL) in Tachikawa. Among various research grants, he has received fellowships from the Guggenheim Foundation, Ford Foundation, and the Japan Foundation (twice).

== Books ==
- Studies in Early Japanese Morphophonemics (Bloomington: Indiana University Linguistics Club, 1977; 2nd ed. 1993)
- With F. C. Lorish, M. Noda, Y. Wada A Framework for Introductory Japanese Language Curricula in American High Schools and Colleges (Washington, D.C.: National Foreign Language Center, 1993)
- The Fifth Generation Fallacy (New York: Oxford University Press, 1987)
- Literacy and Script Reform in Occupation Japan (New York: Oxford University Press, 1996)
- Ideogram: Chinese Characters and the Myth of Disembodied Meaning (Honolulu: University of Hawai'i Press, 2004)
- The Role of Contact in the Origins of the Japanese and Korean Languages (Honolulu: University of Hawai'i Press, 2009)
- Sangaku Proofs: a Japanese Mathematician at Work (Ithaca: Cornell East Asia Series, 2015)
- Sangaku Reflections: a Japanese Mathematician Teaches (Ithaca: Cornell East Asia Series, 2017)
