= Ki-Moon Lee =

South Korean linguist (1930–2020)

- Born: October 23, 1930; Chongju, Heian'nan Province, Korea, Empire of Japan
- Died: February 19, 2020 (aged 89); Seoul, South Korea
- Citizenship: South Korea
- Education: Seoul National University (BA, 1953; MA, 1957; PhD, 1973)
- Awards: Order of Cultural Merit (1990); Order of Civil Merit (1996); Fukuoka Prize (1998); Samil Prize (1985)

Korean name
- Hangul: 이기문
- Hanja: 李基文
- RR: I Gimun
- MR: I Kimun

Ki-Moon Lee (Korean: 이기문; October 23, 1930 – February 19, 2020) was a South Korean linguist. He was considered one of the leading authorities on the study of the Korean language.

== Biography ==
Lee was born on October 23, 1930 in Chongju, Heian'nan Province, Korea, Empire of Japan as a son of peasant Lee Chan-gap (이찬갑). His older brother was historian of Korea Ki-baik Lee.

In 1949, he fled from North Korea to South Korea. He graduated from Choongang Middle School that year. In 1953, he graduated with a bachelor's degree from the Department of Korean Language and Literature at Seoul National University (SNU). He received his master's degree in 1957 and PhD in literature in 1973, both from SNU. In 1959, he taught at Korea University. He was a visiting scholar at the Harvard–Yenching Institute in the United States from September 1960 to June 1961. He worked in the Department of Korean Language and Literature at SNU from 1962 until his retirement in February 1996. He was the first visiting professor at the new Department of Korean Culture at the University of Tokyo in 1993.

In 1982, he was made a member of the National Academy of Sciences of the Republic of Korea. In 1985, he served as the head of the Linguistic Society of Korea (국어국문학회). In 1988, he was the head of the Society of Korean Linguistics (국어학회). He served as the 3rd Director General of the Korean Language Research Institute from March 16, 1988 to March 15, 1990.

In 1990, he received the Order of Cultural Merit. In 1996, he received the Order of Civil Merit grade 4. He received the 1998 Fukuoka Prize for his contributions to East Asian linguistics. In 2001, he was made an honorary member of the Linguistic Society of America.

He died in Seoul on February 19, 2020 at the age of 89 (90 in Korean age).

== Awards ==
- 1985: Samil Prize
- 1990: Order of Cultural Merit
- 1996: Order of Civil Merit
- 1998: Fukuoka Prize
