= Alexander Vovin =

Russian-American linguist (1961–2022)

- Александр Вовин
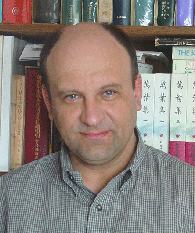
- Born: Alexander Vladimirovich Vovin; 27 January 1961; Leningrad, Russian SFSR, Soviet Union (present-day Saint Petersburg, Russia)
- Died: 8 April 2022 (aged 61); Paris, France
- Spouse: Sambi Ishisaki-Vovin (m. 2000)
- Children: 3

Academic background
- Education: Leningrad State University
- Thesis: (1987)

Academic work
- Institutions: School for Advanced Studies in the Social Sciences, University of Hawaiʻi at Mānoa, Miami University, University of Michigan
- Notable students: Marc Miyake

Alexander Vladimirovich Vovin (Russian: Александр Владимирович Вовин; 27 January 1961 – 8 April 2022) was a Soviet-born Russian-American linguist and philologist, and director of studies at the School for Advanced Studies in the Social Sciences (EHESS) in Paris, France. He was known for his research on East Asian languages. His main interest was in Japanese, but he studied many other languages and families, including Korean, Ainu, Tibetan, Mongolic, Tungusic, and Turkic.

== Education ==
Vovin earned his M.A. in structural and applied linguistics from the Saint Petersburg State University in 1983, and his Ph.D. in historical Japanese linguistics and premodern Japanese literature from the same university in 1987, with a doctoral dissertation on the Hamamatsu Chūnagon Monogatari (ca. 1056).

== Career ==
Vovin served as a Junior Researcher at the St. Petersburg Institute of Oriental Studies from 1987–1990. However, because he was unable to get permission to visit Japan and other East Asian countries from the Soviet government, he moved to the United States in 1990. There, he held positions as assistant professor of Japanese at the University of Michigan (1990–1994), assistant professor at Miami University (1994–1995), and assistant, associate, and full professor at the University of Hawaiʻi at Mānoa (1995–2014). He was visiting professor at the International Research Center for Japanese Studies, Kyoto from 2001 to 2002 and again in 2008, a visiting professor at the Ruhr University Bochum, Germany (2008–2009), and a visiting professor at the National Institute for Japanese Language and Linguistics (NINJAL) in Tokyo, Japan from May to August 2012.

In 2014, Vovin accepted the position of Director of Studies at the Centre de recherches linguistiques sur l'Asie orientale (CRLAO) unit of the EHESS, where he remained until his death in 2022.

Early in Vovin's career he was a supporter of the Altaic hypothesis, but beginning in the 2000s, he published several papers arguing against it.

Vovin specialized in Japanese historical linguistics (with emphasis on etymology, morphology, and phonology), and Japanese philology of the Nara period (710–792), and to a lesser extent of the Heian period (792–1192). His last project before his death involved the complete academic translation into English of the Man'yōshū (ca. 759), the earliest and the largest premodern Japanese poetic anthology, alongside the critical edition of the original text and commentaries. He also researched the moribund Ainu language in northern Japan, and worked on Inner Asian languages and Kra–Dai languages, especially those preserved only in Chinese transcription, as well as on Old and Middle Korean texts.

His last work, published in 2021, is on the Bussokuseki no Uta of Yakushi-ji temple in Nara. In the same year, a festschrift was dedicated to Vovin on his 60th birthday.

He had been engaged in coordinating the Etymological Dictionary of the Japonic Languages from 2019 to the time of his death in 2022, with cooperation from several universities and European Union funding of €2,470,200,00. However, the project was terminated upon his death.

== Personal life ==
Vovin was married twice: first to Varvara G. Lebedeva-Vovina (née Churakova), with whom they have a son, Aleksei, born in 1982, and the second time to fellow Japanese language researcher Sambi Ishisaki (Japanese: 石崎賛美) in 2000. Two more children were born to the second marriage.

He died on 8 April 2022, at the age of 61, from cancer.

== Publications ==
- Vovin, Alexander (1993). A Reconstruction of Proto-Ainu. Leiden: E. J. Brill. ISBN 90-04-09905-0.
- Vovin, Alexander. (2000). Did the Xiong-nu speak a Yeniseian language?. Central Asiatic Journal, 44(1), pages 87–104. JSTOR 41928223.
- Vovin, Alexander. (2001). Japanese, Korean and Tungusic. Evidence for genetic relationship from verbal morphology. David B. Honey and David C. Wright (eds.), pages 183–202.
- Vovin, Alexander; Osada Toshiki (長田俊樹), eds. (2003). 日本語系統論の現在 [Perspectives on the Origins of the Japanese Language]. Nichibunken sōsho, 31. Kyoto: International Research Center for Japanese Studies. ISBN 978-4-901558-17-4. ISSN 1346-6585.
- Vovin, Alexander (2003). A Reference Grammar of Classical Japanese Prose. London: RoutledgeCurzon. ISBN 0-7007-1716-1.
- Vovin, Alexander. (2003). Once again on lenition in Middle Korean. Korean Studies, 27, pages 85–107. JSTOR 23719571.
- Vovin, Alexander (2005). A Descriptive and Comparative Grammar of Western Old Japanese: Part 1: Sources, Script and Phonology, Lexicon and Nominals. Folkestone, Kent: Global Oriental. doi:10.1163/9789004213920. ISBN 1-901903-14-1.
- Vovin, Alexander (2006). The Manchu-Tungusic Languages. Richmond: RoutledgeCurzon. ISBN 978-0-7007-1284-7.
- Vovin, Alexander (2008). Korea-Japonica: A Re-evaluation of a Common Genetic Origin. Hawaii studies on Korea. Honolulu: University of Hawaiʻi Press. ISBN 978-0-8248-3278-0.
- Vovin, Alexander (2009–2018). Man'yoshu: A New English Translation Containing the Original Text, Kana Transliteration, Romanization, Glossing and Commentary. Global Oriental/Brill., 20 volumes
- Vovin, Alexander (2009). A Descriptive and Comparative Grammar of Western Old Japanese: Part 2: Adjectives, Verbs, Adverbs, Conjunctions, Particles, Postpositions. Folkestone, Kent: Global Oriental. doi:10.1163/ej.9781905246823.i-1376. ISBN 978-1-905246-82-3.
- Vovin, Alexander. (2011). Why Japonic is not demonstrably related to 'Altaic' or Korean. In Historical Linguistics in the Asia-Pacific region and the position of Japanese, The International Conference on Historical Linguistics (ICHL) XX.
- Vovin, Alexander. & McCraw, D. (2011). Old Turkic Kinship Terms in Early Middle Chinese. Türk Dili Araştırmaları Yıllığı Belleten, 59(1), 105–116.
- Vovin, Alexander. (2017). Koreanic loanwords in Khitan and their importance in the decipherment of the latter. Acta Orientalia Academiae Scientiarum Hungaricae, 70(2), pages 207–215. doi:10.1556/062.2017.70.2.4
- Vovin, Alexander; Ishisaki-Vovin, Sambi (2021). The Eastern Old Japanese Corpus and Dictionary. Handbook of Oriental Studies, Section 5 Japan, Volume 17. Brill. doi:10.1163/9789004471665. ISBN 978-90-04-47119-1.
- Vovin, Alexander (2021). The Footprints of the Buddha. The Text and the Language. Leiden: Brill. ISBN 978-9-004-44977-0.
