= Jie-Hyun Lim =

South Korean historian

- 임지현
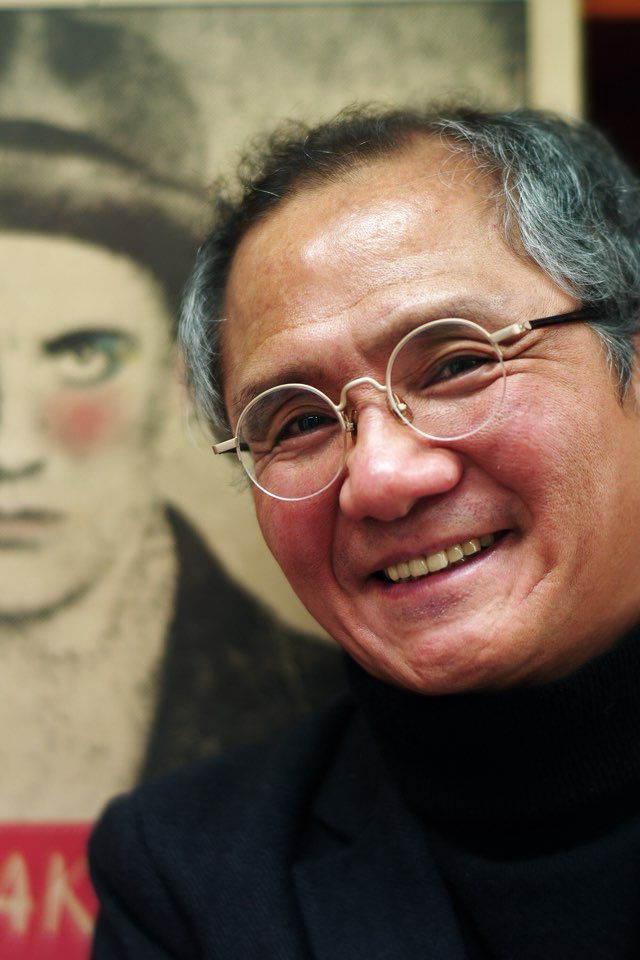
- Born: 1959 (age 66–67); Seoul, South Korea

Academic background
- Education: Sogang University
- Thesis: Marx-Engels와 민족문제 (1988)

Academic work
- Discipline: History
- Sub-discipline: Marxism, Western history, Polish history
- Main interests: Transnational history, Global history, Global memory, Critical historiography
- Notable ideas: Victimhood Nationalism, Mass Dictatorship, Everyday Fascism, Global Memory Formation

Korean name
- Hangul: 임지현
- Hanja: 林志弦
- RR: Im Jihyeon
- MR: Im Chihyŏn
- Website: Publications by Jie-Hyun Lim at ResearchGate

Jie-Hyun Lim (Korean: 임지현; born 1959) is a South Korean historian, writer, and "memory activist." He is a full professor of transnational history and the director of the Critical Global Studies Institute at Sogang University, Seoul, who conceptualized paradigms of "Mass Dictatorship" and "Victimhood Nationalism." Since Lim founded the Research Institute of Comparative History and Culture in 2004, he has carried out a series of international projects, including the "East Asian History Forum for Criticism and Solidarity" and the "Flying University of Transnational Humanities."

Lim has written and edited around two dozen books, including Global Easts: Remembering, Imagining, Mobilizing (Columbia University Press, 2022), Everyday Fascism (우리 안의 파시즘, 2000), and Victimhood Nationalism (희생자의식 민족주의, 2021). He is a co-editor of Gender Politics and Mass Dictatorship: Global Perspectives (2011), Mass Dictatorship and Memory as Ever Present Past: Mass Dictatorship in the 20th Century (2014), The Palgrave Handbook of Mass Dictatorship (2016), and Mnemonic Solidarity: Global Interventions (2021), among other works.

Lately, Lim has been delving into the field of “transnational history [and memory] as an alternative narrative to the national [one],” asserting that memory beneath history should be deterritorialized. He is also conceptualizing "Global Easts" that are neither Global North nor Global South, thereby developing the problem consciousness of his 2022 publication from the perspective of the global history of modernity.

== Life ==
=== Early life ===
Ji-Hyun Lim was born in 1959 in Seoul, South Korea, not long after the conclusion of the Korean War (1950⎼1953). At that time, the Military coup d'état in May 1961 established Park Chung Hee’s regime (1961⎼1979) of Development Dictatorship, with its gilded slogans—“Korean way of democracy” and “the National Regeneration” (Yu-shin Constitution). As Lim retrospects, “[t]he shattered Cold War constellation provided the conditions for Park to proclaim a state of emergency, which rationalized the shift from democracy to dictatorship,” in which “the individual selves voluntarily sacrifice[d] themselves for the higher self or absolute ego of the nation.”

In 1977 when Lim was attending Sogang University as a history student and university newspaper reporter, a police investigator visited Lim's house because he was a member of “Red Clay” (황토 [hwang-t'o]), a clandestine anti-autocracy circle of Sogang University. This experience led Lim to learn about his late grandfather’s past as a troika of the Korean Communist Party and an independence fighter during the Japanese occupation. Lim confesses in his autobiography, Doing History (역사를 어떻게 할 것인가: 어느 사학자의 에고 히스토리, 2016), that he has always thought of his academic pursuit as participating in his grandfather's “inner exile.”

After the outbreak of the Gwangju Uprising (1980), Lim felt a strong sense of survivor's shame, which spurred him to study Marxist intellectual history as a graduate student at Sogang University. Above all, Lim wanted to establish "South Korean social science" or "South Korean Western history” based on the problem consciousness of his society, where the aftermath of the Gwangju Uprising came as too heavy a task for South Korean historians. In 1989, he finalized his dissertation, “Marx and Engels on the National Question” (Korean: Marx-Engels와 민족문제), which investigates nationalist issues in light of Marxist thought.

=== Career ===
In 1989, Lim became an associate professor at Hanyang University, Seoul, and later served as the chair of the history department from 1997 to 1999.

Meanwhile, Lim was a visiting professor at the Pedagogical University of Cracow in the 1990s. In this post-communist Poland, he witnessed the Polish transition from real socialism to a market economy and democracy, regarded by the Polish people as “a stubborn rightist” because of his Luxembourgian Marxism. Compared with Lim's twenties in postcolonial South Korea, where he imagined Korea's transition to socialism and looked at the rapid economic growth of Korea as “an angry young leftist,” his stay in Poland was the opposite experience. Lim acknowledges that such contrasting observations on the edges of East Asia and Eastern Europe have been valuable assets in exploring the periphery of global history: it allowed him “to escape the intellectual complacency, be it leftist or rightist, of Cold War politics.”

From 2004 to 2015, Lim was the founding director of the Research Institute of Comparative History and Culture at Hanyang University.

In March 2015, Lim became a professor of Transnational History at Sogang University, and the same year, he founded the Critical Global Studies Institute.

Other career milestones of Lim include being a visiting scholar at Harvard Yenching Institute (2002⎼2003), International Research Center for Japanese Studies (2009⎼2010), EHESS (2010), Paris II University (2014), Bielefeld University (2017), National Yang Ming Chiao Tung University (2017), Hitotsubashi University (2018), Paris X University (2019), GWZO (2019), and Columbia University (2020); external professor at the University of Glamorgan (2002⎼2003); research fellow at Wissenschaftskolleg (2011⎼2012).

== Work ==
=== Transnationalism ===
In the 1990s, Jie-Hyun Lim juxtaposed Polish and Korean national histories, exploring each narrative's broken sutures. Through this transnational interaction, Lim could critically contemplate South Korea's Korean nationalism (minjok) based on its parallel with the Polish nationalist movement. One of his books that demystifies the nationalist imaginary is Beyond Nationalism (민족주의는 반역이다, 1999). This book tried to remove the fictive resistance ideology from the ethnic nationalism, highlighting the shared texture between political power and nationalism. In addition, it paved the way for Lim's later thoughts regarding postcolonialism, subaltern research, and post-Marxist theories.

In the 2000s, Lim's transnational inquisitiveness was stretched into the theme of “border history.” From those years, China had been pushing its Northeast Project, insisting that the history of Goguryeo, an ancient kingdom on the Korean Peninsula across the northeast part of the modern Chinese domain, is theirs. Lim looked at this controversy differently than his South Korean contemporaries, borrowing Thongchai Winichakul’s concept of “geo-body,” the nationalist perception of contemporary territory as its synchronic, timeless body. In Lim's opinion, the history of Goguryeo was neither Chinese nor Korean history; instead, it should be counted as border history, overlapping history, or regional history. That is, to make this territorial dispute a rational and productive debate, both South Korea and China must overcome the compulsion of a “geo-body,” the tendency to be relieved only by incorporating the history of the border areas into its national history.

Since the 2010s, Lim has held the “Flying University of Transnational Humanities,” a trans-institutional summer school program for PhDs and doctoral students. Its main objective is to liberate humanistic imagination from the boundary of the national state by building transnational solidarity. In particular, Lim aimed to encourage trans-disciplinary conversations beyond interdisciplinary ones, resisting the top-down process of globalization led by the capital and political power. For this reason, Lim argues that this project's aspiration to create a global network of transnational humanities research and education is theoretically rooted in the critical rationale of postcolonialism.

Most recently, Lim has been summoning his memory of post-communist Poland in the 1990s, where he recognized striking similarities between Korean and Polish history and politics. One realization stood out: both Korea and Poland—at once the “West” for Asia yet “Eastern Europe''—had been assigned the role of “East.” In his Global Easts: Remembering, Imagining, Mobilizing (2022), Lim explores such entangled Easts to reconsider global history from the margins, drawing out commonalities in their experiences of modernity, their transitions from dictatorship to democracy, and the shaping of collective memory. This line of discussion encompasses Lim's recent paradigms: "mass dictatorship" and "victimhood nationalism." In other words, Lim criticizes mass dictatorships of the right and left in the Global Easts, considering Carl Schmitt’s idea of sovereign dictatorship and the concept of decisionist democracy. Additionally, ranging across Poland, Germany, Israel, Japan, and South Korea, Lim traces how notions of victimhood have become central to nationalism. Finally, Lim argues that nationalism is inherently transnational, critiquing how the nationalist imagination of the Global Easts has influenced countries across borders.

=== Mass Dictatorship ===
Lim’s awareness of “Mass Dictatorship” (“대중독재” [tae-chung-tok-chae]; 大衆獨裁), or grass-roots fascism, germinated in 1999 when the Kim Dae-Jung government announced its project to build the Park Chung Hee Memorial Hall. On the bright side, this was a gesture of democratic peace toward the autocratic past, but Lim interpreted it as "an arrogance that regards social memory as something that may be solved with personal forgiveness and reconciliation." Thus, Lim posed a problem against this consecration of historical memory, recognizing Park's modernization as a “Market Stalinism.” However, such critical awareness did not cross the threshold of academia, and the nostalgia for the Park Regime seemed only to grow in Korean society.

Hence, Lim began to explore in his serial articles of Contemporary Criticism (당대비평) why the public misses the oppressive system. In these writings, which were later published as a separate volume, Everyday Fascism (2000), Lim discusses the routinized and even desired dictatorship of South Korea, arguing that democratic changes in social structure, economic system, laws, political parties, and social organization do not necessarily guarantee the genuine democracy. Also, he insists that unless the fascist fabric of South Korean society that binds people's daily lives fundamentally changes, its democratization of the 1990s is bound to be reversible. For this reason, Lim demanded the deconstruction of South Korea’s internalized and structuralized power code: the ideological fictions. That is to say, the fight against the dictatorship should go on, replacing the habitus of vertical “dominance” with the habitus of “fraternity.”

In the 2000s, Lim published the Mass Dictatorship series (대중독재 1,2,3; 2004–2007) in his capacity as a chief editor. This project was with other South Korean historians specializing in fascism, Nazism, Franco regime, Action française, and Stalinism. Beyond this, there have been six important publications in English on this subject: Gender Politics and Mass Dictatorship: Global Perspectives (Palgrave Macmillan, 2011), Mass Dictatorship and Modernity (Palgrave Macmillan, 2013), Imagining Mass Dictatorships: The Individual and the Masses in Literature and Cinema (Palgrave Macmillan, 2013), Mass Dictatorship and Memory as Ever Present Past (Palgrave Macmillan, 2014), The Palgrave Handbook of Mass Dictatorship (Palgrave Macmillan, 2016), and Everyday Life in Mass Dictatorship: Collusion and Evasion (Palgrave Macmillan, 2016). These works criticize the demonizing logic of existing dictatorship studies, which sets a Manichean dichotomy of “an evil power oppresses good citizens,” whether right-wing or left-wing discourse.

=== Victimhood nationalism ===
“Victimhood nationalism” is Lim's most recent paradigm, which again questions the nationalist antagonism based on collective affiliation, or whether collective and hereditary guilt/victimhood can be established. In his Victimhood Nationalism (2021), Lim sharply pinpoints the politicized sense of victimhood with controversial examples, including the long-stood binary of Korea and Japan (“Korean victims” versus “Japanese perpetrators” of the colonial occupation). Lim argues that such a nationalist equation is both right and wrong because no country is made up of purely victims or perpetrators. In other words, the global memory space is transnationally designed with political facts and statistics that are never value-neutral. To prove this, Lim collected data from different corners of the global memory space, including diplomatic documents, academic discussions, press, testimonials, popular culture, and social media, regarding two regional groups: Eastern Europe (Poland–Germany–Israel) and East Asia (Korea–Japan–the U.S.). Through such comparative analysis, he explores how the competing narratives of victimhood are produced and consumed, proving that “Victimhood Nationalism” is inherently a transnational and planetary discourse.

While Lim propels forward “from history to memory” as such, being a “memory activist” who restores the authenticity of memories that have been repressed over a long time, it is notable that his theory of "victimhood nationalism" is from the periphery of global modernity, based on the real experiences of Eastern Europe and East Asia; it does not settle for an unequal academic division of labor, in which the West presents theories, and the East provides empirical data to them.

In 2022, Victimhood Nationalism was translated into Japanese, which is acclaimed that "[the Japanese] will not be able to greet August (the month when Imperial Japan surrendered in World War II) without mentioning this book."

== Criticism ==
In 2004, Jie-Hyun Lim suggested a transnational viewpoint regarding the dispute over Goguryeo history, insisting on deconstructing the concept of national history. To this, some scholars condemned him as ignoring Korea’s long-standing national identity as "the successor of Goguryeo," which has continued since the Goryo Dynasty, emphasizing that Lim specializes in "Western history," not Korean history discipline.

Also, when Lim argued that the masses agreed upon President Park’s dictatorship like other 20th-century fascisms, he was heavily criticized by the nationalist leftists in South Korea. They blamed Lim’s theory of "Everyday Fascism" as fundamentalism or "progressive nihilism" that blankets the troubles of political dictatorship, even judging it as reducing everything to a matter of etiquette and being in sympathy with the far right. However, the essential idea of Lim is not to overlook the moral issues found in historical figures but rather to theorize the hegemonic power of ideology that dominates the daily lives of the masses.

Similar criticism arose when Lim first used the concept of "Victimhood Nationalism" in 2007, shedding a different light on the fuss around the novel So Far from the Bamboo Grove (1986) by Yoko Kawashima Watkins, a Japanese American writer. Since this story illustrates the suffering of Japanese refugees returning home from emancipated Korea, portraying Koreans as evil perpetrators and Japanese as innocent victims, critics accused it of hiding the history of the Japanese colonization of the Korean peninsula. Nevertheless, Lim argued that such a collective denunciation of Korean people toward this work is instead an overreaction to deny the uncomfortable truth—not because Watkins’ decontextualization of the main characters' lives is unproblematic, but because this narrative is undeniably an authentic memory of some Japanese people. This criticism inspired Lim to point out the antagonistic symbiosis between the victim nation and the perpetrator nation, or, in other words, the transnational nature of “Victimhood Nationalism.”

== Selected publications ==
=== Authored books ===
- Victimhood Nationalism: History and Memory in a Global Age. Translated by Sungyoon, Megan. Columbia University Press. 2025. ISBN 9780231216890.
- Global Easts: Remembering, Imagining, Mobilizing. Columbia University Press. 2022. ISBN 9780231206761.

=== Edited books ===
- Mnemonic Solidarity-Global Interventions (2021)
- The Palgrave Handbook of Mass Dictatorship (2016)
- Mass Dictatorship and Memory as Ever Present Past (2014)
- Gender Politics and Mass Dictatorship: Global Perspectives (2011)

=== Book chapters ===
- “Introduction: Mnemonic Solidarity,” Mnemonic Solidarity-Global Interventions (2021)
- “Postcolonial Reflections on the Mnemonic Confluence of the Holocaust, Stalinist Crimes, ad Colonialism,” Mnemonic Solidarity-Global Interventions (2021)
- “Nationalizing the Bolshevik Revolution Transnationally: Non-Western Modernization among Proletarian Nations,” The Global Impacts of Russia’s Great War and Revolution, Book 2: The Wider Arc of Revolution, Part 2 (2019)
- “Transnational Memory Formation: Memory-History-Culture,” The Routledge Companion to World Literature and World History (2018)
- “World History, Nationally: How has the national appropriated the transnational in East Asian historiography?,” Global History, Globally (2018)
- “Afterword: entangled memories of the Second World War,” Remembering the Second World War (2017)
- “Introduction” and "Victimhood," The Palgrave Handbook of Mass Dictatorship (2016)
- “Nationalism and History,” The Wiley-Blackwell Encyclopedia of Race, Ethnicity and Nationalism (2015)
- “Second World War in Global Memory Space,” Cambridge History of Second World War (2015)
- “Mass dictatorship as a transnational formation,” Modernity and Mass Dictatorship (2013)
- “Introduction: Coming to Terms with the Past of Mass Dictatorships,” Mass Dictatorship and Memory as Ever Present Past (2014)
- “Victimhood nationalism in coming to terms with the mass dictatorship,” Mass Dictatorship and Memory as Ever Present Past (2014)
- Lim, Jie-Hyun (2014). "Victimhood Nationalism in the Memory of Mass Dictatorship". Mass Dictatorship and Memory as Ever Present Past. Palgrave Macmillan. pp. 36–61. doi:10.1057/9781137289834_3. ISBN 978-1-137-28983-4.
- “Towards a Transnational History of Victimhood Nationalism: On the Trans-Pacific Space,” The Trans-Pacific Imagination: Rethinking Boundary, Culture and Society (2012)
- “Historicizing the World in East Asia,” A Companion to World History (2012)
- “Nationalism, Neo-Nationalism,” Encyclopedia of Global Studies (2012)
- “Introduction: Meandering between Self-empowerment and Self-mobilisation,” Gender Politics and Mass Dictatorship: Global Perspectives (2011)
- “Series Introduction: Mapping Mass Dictatorship: Towards a Transnational History of Twentieth-Century Dictatorship,” Gender Politics and Mass Dictatorship: Global Perspectives (2011)
- “Victimhood Nationalism in Contested Memories: National Mourning and Global Accountability,” Memory in a Global Age: Discourses, Practices and Trajectories (2010)

=== Articles ===
- “Triple Victimhood: On the Mnemonic Confluence of the Holocaust, Stalinist Crime, and Colonial Genocide,” Journal of Genocide Research (2020)
- “Mnemonic Solidarity in the Global Memory Space,” Global-e (2019)
- “What is Critical in Critical Global Studies?,” Global-e (2017)
- “History Education and Nationalist Phenomenology in East Asia,” Global Asia (2015)
- “Transnational History of Victimhood Nationalism-On the Transpacific Space," Studia Politologica (2014)
- “A Postcolonial Reading of the Sonderweg: Marxist Historicism Revisited,” Journal of Modern European History (2014)
- “Mass Dictatorship – A Transnational Formation of Modernity,” Moving the Social: Journal of Social History and the History of Social Movements (2012)
- “Victimhood Nationalism and History Reconciliation in East Asia,” History Compass (2010)
- “Appendix: Introduction to TMPR special issue 6.3, ‘Political Religions and Sacralisation of Politics,” Totalitarian Movements and Political Religions (2007)
- “Historiographical Perspectives on ‘Mass Dictatorship,’” Totalitarian Movements and Political Religions (2005).
- “Conference Report: Coercion and Consent: A Comparative Study of ‘Mass Dictatorship’” Contemporary European History (2004)
- “Coercion and Consent: A Comparative Study on Mass Dictatorship,” Potsdamer Bulletin fuer Zeithistorische Studien (2004)

== See also ==
- Transnational history
- History of East Asia
- Eastern European history
- Cultural history of Poland
- Goguryeo controversies
- International Committee of Historical Sciences
