= Goguryeo controversies =

China–Korea historiography disputes

The Goguryeo controversies are disputes between China and Korea (North and South) on the history of Goguryeo, an ancient kingdom (37 BC – 668 AD) located in present-day Northeast China and the Korean Peninsula. At the heart of the Goguryeo controversy is which part of history the kingdom belongs to. Korean scholars have the viewpoint that Goguryeo is part of Korean history alone.

== Overview ==
In 2002, the Northeast Project conducted by the Chinese Academy of Social Sciences (CASS) claimed Goguryeo as a local ethnic minority state in Northeast China. This sparked a major academic and diplomatic controversy, as Korean experts on Goguryeo history accused the Chinese government of using history for political purposes. In response, South Korea established the Goguryeo Research Foundation in 2004 (renamed the Northeast Asian History Foundation in 2006) and summoned the Chinese ambassador. In 2007, the Northeast Project ended, causing the study of Goguryeo history in China to decline dramatically.

Various analyses of the controversy have focused on external motivations for the reevaluation of history, including Korean irredentism towards adjacent Chinese territory, the possibility of North Korean collapse, and the challenge to China from transnational separatism. Nationalist historiography has inflamed both sides of the debate, as Korean nationalism treats the themes of a powerful Korean Goguryeo and independence from China as central (see: Korean nationalist historiography), while Chinese nationalism stresses the inviolability of its territory and the unity of its ethnic groups. Some scholars have also criticized the projection of modern-day national identities onto ancient peoples.

== History of the dispute ==
=== Background ===
As neighboring areas, northeast China and North Korea have both laid claim to the history of ancient kingdoms that occupied the region. The interpretation of history in this region has implications for contemporary territorial sovereignty. During the heyday of Maoism, the Chinese government line was that the history of Goguryeo (Gaogouli in Chinese) was Korean history. Notable statements on Goguryeo being Korean included those by Chinese Prime Minister Zhou Enlai, who said in 1963 that Korean people have lived in the northeastern region of China since ancient times and excavated relics prove that Balhae, considered a successor state of Goguryeo, is a branch of ancient Korea. The former Chinese premier's remarks have been made public through a document entitled "Premier Zhou Enlai's Dialogue on Sino-Korean Relations. During this time, the Chinese position was in part motivated by its good relationship with one of its key allies, North Korea. Since the 1980s, government control over scholarship liberalized, and more than 500 books about Goguryeo-related topics were published since then, comprising 90% of China's research since 1949. During this time, some scholars such as Tan Qixiang questioned the state's old interpretation of history, arguing for the study of all polities within China's territory as part of Chinese history. Jiang Mengshan proposed a "one history, dual use" (一史两用, yīshǐ liǎngyòng) system whereby Goguryeo would also be considered part of China's history, arguing that the kingdom's capital, for 460 out of 706 years, lay in modern northeast China, and that three-quarters of its population were not ethnic Korean. He related ancient identities to modern-day peoples by suggesting that "the people of Buyeo and Goguryeo had the same lineage as the Chinese in the Northeast region, while the Korean people were a part of the Silla lineage."

=== 2002–03 ===
Another faction of historians, led by Sun Jinji (孙进己, Sūn Jìnjǐ) and Zhang Bibo (张碧波, Zhāng Bìbō), of the Heilongjiang Academy of Sciences, criticized Tan and put forth the thesis that Goguryeo should be regarded as a regional subset of Chinese history ("local Chinese history") rather than purely Korean history. They cited the traditional view in Chinese historiography that Korea was founded by the Chinese prince Jizi, as well as Goguryeo's status as a tributary to ancient China. In 2002 these scholars, mostly from northeast China themselves, established the Northeast Project of the Chinese Academy of Social Sciences to investigate this view.

The establishment of the Northeast Project marks the beginning of the modern Goguryeo controversy. However, the Northeast Project cannot be equated with the study of Goguryeo, because it studied more topics than Goguryeo, including the history of the Russian Far East, the Bohai Kingdom, economic history, and local histories in ancient China and Korea.

China states that Goguryeo was an ethnic Tungusic state and in modern-day China, Tungusic ethnicities like Manchus, Xibe, Oroqen, and Nanai are citizens of China and viewed as part of China's multi-ethnic historical civilization. The Tungusic Yemaek founded Goguryeo and it was also populated by Tungusic Mohe people.

In 2003, China applied with UNESCO to register the Capital Cities and Tombs of the Ancient Koguryo Kingdom within its territory as a World Heritage Site. In December, the South Korean government published a report denying that Goguryeo could be considered part of Chinese history, and giving directions to Korean civil society groups on how to counter Chinese claims. Korean nationalists groups and the South Korean popular press in South Korea expressed outrage over the Northeast Project, and some commentators suspected, that because the CASS receives government funding, the Chinese government might support the Northeast Project.

However, the CASS's Center for Borderland History and Geography Research is underfunded, understaffed (containing only 21 researchers), and not self-sufficient; government subsidies came in response to the extremely low salaries in CASS's history and philosophy departments, in contrast to the more lucrative fields of economics and law, and the money given does not match the high strategic value of borderland research. Historically, the CASS has produced research that disagreed with or is critical of government policies.

Other, still more moderate voices in Korea pointed out that several official publications in China refer to Goguryeo simply as Korea's history. Chinese scholars who disagreed with Sun and Zhang's "Chinese local history" view were interviewed by South Korean newspapers. The negative press coverage over the Goguryeo issues increased the incidence of Sinophobia in South Korea, and has possibly influenced South Korea's security strategy to become more pro-American and anti-China.

=== 2004–2007 ===
In March 2004, the South Korean government established the Goguryeo Research Foundation to publish research conducive to its view of Goguryeo as part of Korean history. In April, China's Ministry of Foreign Affairs deleted references to Korea's premodern history on its website, prompting South Korea to summon its Chinese ambassador. In August 2004, China sent its Vice Minister of Foreign Affairs Wu Dawei to Seoul to defuse tensions. China recognized Korea's concerns and pledged not to place the Northeast Project's conclusions in its history textbooks, and both South Korea and China expressed the desire not to see the issue damage relations.

However, China's expressed concerns that Korean irredentism towards northeast China were not addressed by the South Korean side. In September, the South Korean government declared that the 1909 Jiandao Convention, which ceded Korean claims to northeast Chinese territory, was invalid. In 2005, South Korea conducted joint research projects with North Korea on Goguryeo relics near Pyongyang. This was because Chinese social scientists continued to publish research articles on the ancient Northeast Asian polities, including Guchaoxian (Gija Chosun), Fuyu (Puyo), Goguryeo, and Bohai, which Koreans exclusively considered their own.

In 2006, South Korean president Roh Moo-hyun protested this research at the 2006 Asia–Europe Meeting. That year, his government renamed the Goguryeo Research Foundation to the Northeast Asian History Foundation, expanding its mandate. In 2007, the Northeast Project concluded, but neither China nor South Korea has changed their view of Goguryeo history after the dispute. In China, the diplomatic imbroglio meant that research on Goguryeo has become taboo, and former Chinese Goguryeo researchers have diverted their time and resources to other areas.

== Japanese and North Korean views ==
During the 19th and 20th centuries, the Japanese Empire differentiated Goguryeo from the other Three Kingdoms of Korea to claim Japanese (Wa) influence in the non-Goguryeo kingdoms of Baekje and Silla to justify its colonization of Korea. To demonstrate their theories, they moved a stone monument (棕蟬縣神祠碑), which was originally located at Liaodong, into Pyongyang.

Meanwhile, North Korea has glorified Goguryeo's independent qualities as part of their Juche ("self-reliance") ideology, identifying itself with Goguryeo, while equating South Korea with Silla, and the United States with the Tang dynasty. North Korea narrates their national history to conform to Juche, by denying any indication of foreign occupation of the Korean peninsula, such as the existence of any Chinese commanderies there. North Korea's state run media has denounced Chinese claims as "a pathetic attempt to manipulate history for its own interests" or "intentionally distorting historical facts through biased perspectives" in North Korean media.

== Speculative motives ==
Much of the scholarship on the Goguryeo controversy has focused on China's strategic intentions towards the Koreas, and presumptively overlooked the validity of Chinese scholars' historical claims.

Yonson Ahn, a Korean scholar who has studied Korean comfort women and historical debates in Korea and Japan, writes that historians such as Quan Zhezhu, Sun Jinji, Kim Hui-kyo, and Mark Byington "perceive the launching of the Project as a defensive reaction to preserve China's own territorial integrity and stability."

Various explanations advanced for China's interest in northeastern history include: South Korean irredentism over Jiandao (Gando in Korean), privileges granted by South Korea to Koreans in China, and the possible collapse of North Korea.

Modern Chinese nationalism, which in contrast to Korean nationalism, is not based on a "pure blood line" and instead stresses unity in diversity and a supraethnic "Chinese people" or Zhonghua minzu. China also has an interest in promoting stability and the territorial status quo in its border territories, to tackle the advanced cross-border problems of drug trafficking, fundamentalist religious proselytism, ethnic separatism, and illegal immigration. An interpretation which suspects aggressive Chinese motivations is inconsistent with China's own "peaceful rise" rhetoric and with its record of peacefully settling 17 of 23 of its territorial disputes with substantial compromises.

On the other hand, some Chinese scholars perceive the Korean nationalistic sentiments of some Koreans (both North and South) as threatening to its territorial integrity. In fact, there are proponents in both the Korean liberal and conservative camps advocating for the "restoration of the lost former territories." Chinese scholars are afraid of border changes when the North Korean government collapses. Because there are more than 2 million ethnic Koreans living in China's Jilin province, China fears that they might secede from China and join a newly unified Korea.

On the whole, the Goguryeo controversy is more significant to Koreans than Chinese. Reasons for this imbalance include the fact that in modern Korean nationalism, Goguryeo's history is presented as a contrast to Korean history in the 19th and 20th century, during which Korea was subjugated during Korea under Japanese rule after which it became the first major battleground during the Cold War. Another founding tenet of Korean nationalism is to establish independence from China, which it had long been subordinate to as a member of the Tributary system of China. For example, in the 20th century, Koreans switched the central figure in their founding myth from Jizi, a Chinese human sage, to Dangun, a god.

Li Yangfan, a researcher of international relations studies at Peking University, believes that South Korean historical sensationalism, caused by the turbulent modern history of Korea, was the driving force behind the conflict. Li views that South Korean historians push for a strong selective narrative in Korean history, and that the motive for rejecting Goguryeo's Chinese connections is to establish a narrative of a continuous Korean nation-state from Dangun Joseon to Goryeo and modern Korea. As both China and South Korea are in the process of nation-building, Li believes that recognizing South Korea's changes and establishing a set of compatible historiographical views are necessary for China's relations with South Korea.

Gari Ledyard observed that Goguryeo is also regarded as an important part of Northeast Chinese (Dongbei) identity by scholars from that region, just as it is prominent in modern Korean identity. Regarding the registration of the Koguryo UNESCO World Heritage Site, he suggested that there was likely considerable regional pressure on China's national government, and found it understandable that "Dongbei self-respect requires better maintenance for those Koguryo cultural properties".

== Arguments for Goguryeo as a part of Chinese history ==
Chinese scholars are divided on the issue concerning the historical place of Goguryeo. As early as the 1940s, Jin Yufu (金毓黻), a prominent scholar in Northeast Chinese history, asserted that Fuyu (Buyeo) and Goguryeo were indisputable members of the Chinese nation. The following arguments largely represent research work after the 1980s by Sun Jinji, Zhang Bibo, et al., who regard Goguryeo as a Chinese state first and foremost, as well as supporters of the "One History, Two Uses" view, who consider Goguryeo to be part of both Chinese and Korean history.

Other Chinese historians see Goguryeo as a part of Korean history. In many contemporary Chinese publications on China's international relations, for example, the relations between Chinese dynasties and Goguryeo are treated as foreign relations or Sino-Korean relations.

=== Arguments regarding the history of Goguryeo ===
- Goguryeo grew out of the Xuantu Commandery of the Han dynasty. The Goguryeo state was founded in present-day Huanren County, Liaoning province, and expanded to large swathes of Northeast China through a series of conquest wars against neighboring states.
- Goguryeo's capital was located in Northeast China from 37 BC to 427 AD, which accounted for around two-thirds of Goguryeo's history. Pyongyang was Goguryeo's capital only for the last one third of its history.
- Goguryeo was under the jurisdiction of the Xuantu Commandery for a more than a century after its establishment. The Records of Three Kingdoms recorded that during the Han dynasty, the magistrate of Gaogouli County (Goguryeo County) managed household registers of Goguryeo, and Xuantu Commandery regularly granted Goguryeo ceremonial instruments and clothing. Xuantu was moved further north in the early 2nd century, leaving Goguryeo outside its boundaries. However, the Book of Later Han, the Records of Three Kingdoms and the Samguk sagi all recorded the king of Goguryeo requesting to be placed under the jurisdiction of Xuantu or Liaodong commanderies on several occasions from 111 to 169 AD.
- Goguryeo had a long and stable tributary relationship with Imperial Chinese dynasties after the 4th century. Goguryeo kings actively sought and accepted a tributary status with Chinese dynasties. From 32 BC to 666 AD Goguryeo paid 205 tributes to the Chinese Central Plains dynasties. From 32 BC to 391 AD, Goguryeo paid only 17 tributes, but between 423 AD and 666 AD, 188 tributes were paid. Subordinance, rather than independence, was the norm in Goguryeo's relations with the Chinese Empire. Furthermore, Goguryeo rulers accepted both recognition of royal titles and assignment of government posts in central or local Chinese governments, which shows a Goguryeo self-recognition as a Chinese power, and distinguishes it from foreign tributaries such as Joseon and Vietnam.

=== Arguments regarding the succession of Goguryeo ===
- The Goguryeo people originated in Northeast China. As it expanded, Goguryeo absorbed other ethnic groups in the same area. The Goguryeo were likely descended from a branch of the Maek people that lived in the Hun Jiang basin. The Goguryeo royal family was said to be of Buyeo origin, which was another ancient ethnic group that lived in what is now Jilin, China.
- The majority of Goguryeo's land and population are now within China, making China the main successor of Goguryeo according to official Chinese records and Korean sources. Surviving descendants of the Goguryeo royal family and powerful nobles such as Yŏn Kaesomun served in the Tang government as officials and generals. Some remained in Northeast China and assimilated into the Han Chinese population there. For example, the Gao clan of Tai'an traced their ancestry to Gao Lian (Go Yeon, King Jangsu of Goguryeo). With regard to Goguryeo remnants in territories of the protectorate that were later annexed by Silla, the Old Book of Tang and the New Book of Tang documented that most fled north to the Turkic Khaganate or Mohe tribes. The Mohe people were ancestors of the Jurchens and Manchus, while Mongolic-speaking peoples lived within the Turkic Khaganate.
- The Goguryeo state cannot be viewed as a predecessor of Goryeo (918–1392), nor was it a successor of Gojoseon. There was a 250-year-long gap between the fall of Goguryeo and the founding of Goryeo. Goryeo only controlled a small proportion of Goguryeo territory. Similarly, there was no succession between the contemporary Former Yan and the Yan of Warring States, or between the Later Zhao and the earlier Zhao state.
  - Goryeo adopted its name as it was established through a mutiny in the short-lived Later Goguryeo regime.
  - Furthermore, Goryeo-era historical texts such as the Samguk sagi viewed Goguryeo negatively as the enemy of Silla and rebellious to Tang, while Koreans deified and worshipped Xue Rengui and Su Dingfang, Tang generals that led the war against Goguryeo and Baekje. Goryeo briefly found it useful to invoke the memory of Goguryeo during Mongol invasions, but abandoned this identity permanently once relations stabilized.
- Territorial and population overlap between Gojoseon and early Goguryeo was minimal. Gojoseon's land corresponded to the Lelang Commandery of Han dynasty, as opposed to Goguryeo's founding location within the Xuantu (the second Xuantu Commandery, different from the first) and Liaodong commanderies. Goguryeo only conquered Lelang after more than 400 years of Chinese rule.
- The majority of Goguryeo fortresses and cities, more than 200 in total, were preserved in China, alongside thousands of known burial sites.

=== Goguryeo as a part of both Chinese and Korean history ===
Many Chinese historians do not consider Goguryeo's positions in Chinese history and Korean history to be mutually exclusive. A highly influential view in China, later known as "One History, Two Uses" (一史两用), was proposed by Chinese historical geographer Tan Qixiang in the 1980s. In 427 AD, Goguryeo moved its capital to Pyongyang, and its political and economic center shifted to the Korean Peninsula. Therefore, Tan divided Goguryeo history into two phases: it is considered a regional Chinese power until 427, and a foreign state after moving its capital. Jiang Mengshan suggested that Goguryeo was simultaneously part of Chinese and Korean history. He compared Goguryeo to the Yuan dynasty, which is important to the history of both Mongolia and China.

Critics of Tan's view criticize that the division was not based in historical reality of the time. Zhang Bibo argues that Pyongyang, part of Han dynasty's Lelang Commandery, was within the territories of Han, Wei and Jin dynasties until its conquest by Goguryeo. Prior to the Han conquest, the region was part of Gija Joseon and Wiman Joseon, which successively submitted to Zhou, Qin and Han dynasties.

== Arguments for Goguryeo as a part of Korean history ==
Korean historians generally make these arguments:

=== Arguments regarding the history of Goguryeo ===
Goguryeo is a country founded by Buyeo (Yemaek) people, one of the major ancestors of modern-day Koreans alongside the natives of Samhan. Both Goguryeo and Baekje were successors of Buyeo. The fact that a portion of Goguryeo people were assimilated into China does not necessarily make it Chinese, not to mention that the majority were assimilated into other Koreanic dynasties such as Silla and Balhae at the time of its fall and afterwards. Additionally, significant numbers of dispersed Goguryeo people taken into Tang custody would break free and escape to these neighboring states during the Khitan rebellion of 696 led by Li Jinzhong. Many would later be subjugated by Balhae in its conquest of Little Goguryeo during the era of King Seon. Certain amounts of dispersed population having been assimilated into foreign polities also took place with other Korean dynasties like Goryeo (Mongol invasions of Korea) and Joseon (Manchu Invasions of Korea) during times of war. This does not make them a part of Mongolian or Manchurian history.

- Korean scholars believe that the people of the Three Kingdoms of Korea shared a common ancestor; the Yemaek tribe, which was distinct to nearby Tungusic (Mohe), Mongolic (Xianbei) and Turkic (Göktürks) tribes in terms of genetics, culture and language. Goguryeo's attitudes towards the Mohe people as well as its own perception of its self-identity reveal that it held a discriminatory attitude the Mohe people and held this attitude towards all groups that were culturally and ethnically different from it. As such, Koguryŏ's self-identity was based on two different perceptions; one being the existence of a shared cultural heritage with other Yemaek tribes, for instance other states such as Old Chosŏn, Puyŏ, Paekche, Silla and Parhae.
- Modern Koreans are direct descendants of the Yemaek tribes that originally come from outside the boundaries of Samhan (Manchuria), i.e. Goguryeo, while the Korean language is suggested to be descended from the Goguryeo language by linguistics such as Alexander Vovin and James Marshall Unger. Despite Silla being the one to unite the Korean Peninsula under a single polity after the Silla-Tang Wars, it eventually failed to assimilate the Goguryeo and Baekje populace by instilling a shared identity among them. Furthermore, the conquered Goguryeo and Baekje peoples held deep-rooted resentment towards the Sillan people due to Silla's role in the destruction of their kingdoms, which helped retain their collective consciousness. This was worsened by the class rigidity of the Sillan bone-rank system which prevented upward class mobility particularly for people of Goguryeo and Baekje descent. As a result, when Later Silla began to collapse in the late 9th and early 10th century, regional warlords known as "hojok" (호족; 豪族) took this opportunity and restored Later Baekje and Later Goguryeo to liberate themselves from Sillan dominance. The role of uniting the Koreanic people under a single agenda would befall upon the Goryeo dynasty, founded by the Goguryeoic populace led by Wang Kŏn
- Along with its other counterparts, Silla and Baekje, Goguryeo was traditionally considered as one of the Three Kingdoms of Korea since ancient times and was perceived as a state considered to be one of the predecessors of the Korean nation by both Koreans during the Later Silla and Goryeo dynasties as well as by the Chinese during the Tang dynasty and onwards. Hence, the inclusion of its history in historical records such as Samguk Sagi and Samguk Yusa. Meanwhile, classical Chinese records have excluded Northern Korean kingdoms including Goguryeo in being as one of their own and categorized it as the history of the Joseon people throughout the ages such as how records of the Tang dynasty indicated that Goguryeo was a part of the Samhan. The recent movement to incorporate ancient Korean kingdoms that held presence in Manchuria (Gojoseon, Buyeo, Balhae, Goguryeo, etc.) as Chinese history is only recent following the Northeast Project with political motives behind it.
- Although supporters of the concept that Goguryeo is Chinese argue that many Goguryeo peoples were deported to China (appx. 28,200–38,200 out of 690,000 post-war households by official historical records/Korean sources and 78,000 by Chinese scholar Wang Zhenping), this arguably enhances the case that Goguryeo is Korean rather than Chinese. Whereas the victorious Tang dynasty had to forcefully deport tens of thousands of Goguryeo civilians to China, many surviving Goguryeo remnants outright resisted Tang China's Protectorate to Pacify the East. Most Goguryeo remnants either rebelled and formed Balhae alongside the Mohe people, or fled to Silla. It is attested multiple times in Korean and Chinese historical records that Goguryeo and Baekje remnants sided with Silla, their long-time enemy and resisted Tang China's attempts to conquer the rest of the Korean Peninsula during the Silla-Tang War. For example, the Goguryeo Pretender King Anseung who was the nephew or illegitimate son of the last Goguryeo King, rebelled against Tang rule which failed. He fled to Silla, leading 4,000 households with him, and the Sillan King bestowed upon him titles of nobility and territory to rule as a vassal. The idea that the migrants of Goguryeo voluntarily took refuge in Silla (and were rewarded) indicated that something was very different from the way they were forcibly relocated into China by the Tang. In Silla, there were also the former territories of Goguryeo and its residents from areas such as Kaesong, a Goguryeo Stronghold. Silla's dual, contradictory policy towards Goguryeo can arguably be explained as that of a benevolent conqueror including the defeated Baekje and Goguryeo peoples as a part of a unified Samhan identity while at the same time treating them as second-class members of Silla, similar to how in many modern states, certain regional identities are prioritized with Prestige Dialects and prestige identities while lesser regional identities are still accepted within a common identity albeit with far less recognition and respect. This explains why the Goguryeo peoples maintained a collective identity despite two centuries of Sillan rule, and also explains why Goryeo ultimately did decide to mercifully spare the last remnants of Silla at the end of the Later Three Kingdoms period.
- Records indicate that Goguryeo rebels launched uprisings every year from 670 to 673, and numerous efforts to restore Goguryeo and expel the Tang were made by the last King of Goguryeo Bojang of Goguryeo, his nephew or illegitimate son Anseung, Goguryeo General Geom Mojam, the Kingdom of Silla (which was waging war against its former patron-ally over control of former Goguryeo and Baekje territories) and finally the founders of Balhae, Dae Jung-sang and Dae Joyeong.
- Goguryeo lasted about 700 years while no Chinese dynasty concurrent with Goguryeo's rule lasted for more than 500 years. It was Imperial China's tributary only during some of its existence. More importantly, being a tributary of Imperial China doesn't make the state a Chinese one nor does it symbolizes the total subjugation of the state. The tributary system applied by Chinese dynasties was a practice conducted by both parties in which the tributary would profit from political/diplomatic recognition, products of civilization bestowed by the host while the host would honor the tributary hence the strengthened legitimacy of their own imperial status and hegemony. Many East Asia dynasties and kingdoms, like Silla, Goryeo, Japan, Ryukyu etc., maintained tributary relationships with Chinese dynasties. Such misunderstandings are attributed to the confusion regarding the difference between tributaries and vassals; and the tributary system adopted in East Asia overall back then. For example, Silla, Goguryeo, Baekje and early-mid Joseon were tributaries of various Chinese dynasties such as the Sui, Tang, Ming and Qing dynasties but were considered independent states by the Chinese. This is in stark contrast with the Goryeo dynasty during Yuan Rule or the late Joseon dynasty, which was a client state of the Qing dynasty.
- Legacy of names. Joseon ("Gojoseon") is considered the first Korean kingdom. After the collapse of Goguryeo, the Tang emperor gave to the last ruler of Goguryeo Bojang of Goguryeo the title "King of Joseon" named after the original Joseon kingdom showing that the Chinese themselves considered Goguryeo and Joseon the same lineage. Goguryeo was succeeded by Goryeo ("Later Goguryeo") which was succeeded again by "Joseon"
- The view that Goguryeo is Chinese contradicts with Chinese history records of the past Chinese dynasties, which considered it a part of the cultural Sinosphere, but was a separate and foreign political entity. Based on epitaphs dating to the 4th and 5th centuries, Goguryeo had concepts of Son of Heaven (天帝之子) and independent tianxia. The rulers of Goryeo used the titles of emperor and Son of Heaven and positioned Goryeo at the center of the Haedong "East of the Sea" tianxia, which encompassed the historical domain of the "Samhan", another name for the Three Kingdoms of Korea.
- Goryeo was founded by Wang Kŏn, whom himself descended from the Gaesong Wang clan of Goguryeo nobility. Modern historians believe that Wang Kŏn's ancestors were a powerful clan that conducted maritime trade with China for generations. According to the Gaoli tujing (c. early 12th century) by the Song dynasty envoy Xu Jing, Wang Kŏn's ancestors were Goguryeo nobility. According to Jang Deokho: His ancestors were Goguryeo refugees who settled around Songak, accumulating great wealth through maritime trade and gaining control of the region, including the Ryesong River. During the Later Silla period, the northern regions, including Songak, were the strongholds of Goguryeo refugees, and Wang Kŏn's hometown of Songak would become the original capital of Later Goguryeo in 901. The Kingdom considered itself to be the continuation (successor state) of Goguryeo, and had ambitions to reclaim former Goguryeo territories. In fact, there were no political succession of Later Silla by Goryeo as Goryeo was not founded upon the Silla government nor did it succeed in its namesake but that of Goguryeo. Hence, Silla's annexation by Goryeo. As evidenced by the 'Northward Policy (북진 정책)' conducted by Wang Kŏn and his heirs, Goryeo launched several major military campaigns to reclaim territories that they deemed rightfully theirs as ancestral inheritance lost to them. The Jurchen Expeditions (1104~1109) led by Yun Kwan, Anti-Yuan Campaigns and Liaodong Expeditions (1356~1370) led by Gongmin of Goryeo and Lee Seong Gye were all extensions of the Northward Policy first implemented by Wang Kŏn.
- The Samguk Sagi was written by Kim Bu-sik, who was an important Korean historian from the Goryeo dynasty. However, it cannot be ignored that Kim Bu-sik was a member of the Gyeongju Kim clan, which were the direct descendants of the last king of Silla, Gyeongsun of Silla. Korean historians have noted that Kim extensively focuses on Silla's history during the Three Kingdoms period, and relegates much less attention to both Goguryeo and Baekje. The pro-Confucian sentiment and favorable bias to Silla and Tang found in the Samguk Sagi was due in large part to the Gyeongju Kim Clan's political dominance of Goryeo during the Samguk Sagi's compilation.

=== Arguments regarding the succession of Goguryeo ===
- Goryeo rebuilt Pyongyang, the capital of Goguryeo, and made it its second capital by naming it the 'West Capital (서경; 西京)', as a means to advocate the legitimacy of succeeding Goguryeo while using it as a forward base to reclaim former territories and fend off potential invaders like the Khitans. Many of the lands that were recovered by the Goryeo dynasty during its early days were territories considered central to Goguryeo alongside the Paeseo Region (Korean: 패서; Hanja: 浿西; territories beneath the Taedong River) in which the founders of Goryeo were based upon due to its concentrated population, fertile lands, and relative prosperity during Unified Silla.
- Goguryeo was also succeeded by Balhae. After being conquered by the Liao dynasty, the last crown prince of Balhae, Dae Gwang Hyeon, and the majority of the state's royalty nobility took refuge in Goryeo, thus uniting the two successor dynasties of Goguryeo. Exodus en masse towards Goryeo continued on until 1116, with Balhae people seeking refuge from political instability inside Liao and in pursuit of conjoining with their kin. It is speculated that the mass influx of Balhae refugees in the span of two centuries has led to a significant rise in Goguryeoic people that was already one of the dominant groups within Goryeo compared to that of Silla and Baekje after the fall of both states; of which the two have since experienced devastating warfare, political instability, rebellions, and social stratification even before the Later Three Kingdoms era. Bearers of Balhae's royal surname Tae (太) and Dae (大), as well as Goguryeo's royal surname Ko (高), still lives on to this day in North and South Korea.
- Taejo of Goryeo viewed Balhae as a state constituted by his own kind, the Goguryeo people, and referred to them as 'relatives'. According to the Zizi Tongjian, Taejo sent emissaries accompanied by the Later Jin monk Waluo (襪囉) to Shi Jingtang in request of a joint attack on the Khitans to rescue the Balhae King as Balhae is considered a 'relative country' of Goryeo. (勃海本吾親戚之國, 其王爲契丹所虜, 吾欲爲朝廷攻而取之, 且欲平其舊怨. 師廻, 爲言於天子. 當定期兩襲之.)
- Supporting the previous argument, although Goryeo arose 250 years after the fall of Goguryeo, discrimination from the ruling Sillan people, particularly through its Bone-rank System, kept Goguryeo identity alive. The Baekje and Goguryeo refugees retained their respective collective consciousnesses and maintained a deep-seated resentment and hostility toward Silla. Beginning in the late 8th century, Later Silla was undermined by instability because of political turbulence in the capital and class rigidity in the bone-rank system, leading to the weakening of the central government and the rise of the "hojok" (호족; 豪族) regional lords. This helps explain how the military officer Kyŏn Hwŏn revived Baekje in 892 with the descendants of the Baekje refugees, and the Buddhist monk Kung Ye revived Goguryeo in 901 with the descendants of the Goguryeo refugees; these states are called Later Baekje and Later Goguryeo in historiography, and together with Later Silla form the Later Three Kingdoms. Later Goguryeo originated in the northern regions of Later Silla, which, along with its capital located in modern-day Kaesong, North Korea, were the strongholds of the Goguryeo refugees. Among the Goguryeo refugees was Wang Kŏn, a member of a prominent maritime hojok based in Kaesong, who traced his ancestry to a great clan of Goguryeo.
- Like Wang Kŏn, regional warlords and residents situated in today's Pyeong'an, Hwanghae, Gangwon, and northern parts of the Gyeonggi Province were for the most part Goguryeo refugees that founded the Goryeo dynasty with Wang Kŏn. Korean surnames such as Yun (尹), Kang (姜/康), Yoo (柳/庾/劉), Yeom (廉), Cha (車), Hwangbo (皇甫), etc., are known to have descended from these regional lords of Goguryeo descent. Aside from these surnames, other regional lords and contributors to the founding of the nation were also given Silla-style surnames such as Kim (金), Park (朴), Choi (崔), and Jung (鄭). A significant amount of Goguryeo refugees have also maintained a strong presence in the southwestern regions of the Jeolla Province after the fall of Goguryeo in the form of the Kingdom of Bodeok; later having been incorporated into Silla and hence deported to southern regions by Sinmun of Silla. The main contingents of the Goguryeo Revival Movement linked with former Goguryeo warlords and nobles rooted in Liaodong and Pyongyang rebelling against Tang's dominion have also been accepted into Silla during the course of the Silla-Tang Wars; later settling within Silla's polity. These dispersed group of Goguryeo people would later constitute a part of the northern warlords and residents of Goguryeo descent around the time of Silla's fall.
- A major portion of the existing Kim clans that place their roots in Silla royalty and nobility are also said to be descended from the royal family of Goryeo through their maternal line as marriage between the two royal families took place after Silla's fall in 935. The Gyeongju, Eonyang, Samcheok, Andong, Uiseong, Naju, Kangneung, Seonsan, Tongcheon, Buryeong Kims, etc., are offspring of these intermarriages between the two royal families.
- One of the reasons behind Goryeo's Jurchen Expeditions (1104~1109) was to reclaim former Goguryeo territories. According to the 'Biographies of Yun Kwan' written in the Goryeosa, the head of the commander whom spearheaded the invasions, Yun Kwan, quoted after claiming Jurchen-held territories, "These lands were originally owned by Goguryeo. The text of the old monument still remains. How would this not be the will of the heavens for our King (Yejong of Goryeo) has acquired what Goguryeo had lost before? (而本勾高麗之所有也. 其古碑遺跡 尙有存焉. 夫勾高麗失之於前 今上得之於後, 豈非天歟). Diplomatic feuds between the Korean Goryeo dynasty and Jurchen Jin dynasty continued despite peace agreements after Goryeo's failed attempt to conquer Jurchen territories in which two major military campaigns had mobilized at least 250,000 troops from Goryeo alone. The Jurchen's who won the war with a heavy cost with their lands devastated by the Koreans would later conquer the Northern Song dynasty under Aguda's leadership. However, Goryeo during the reign of Yejong did not tolerate Aguda's self-proclamation as Emperor after his empire's ascension following the defeat of the Song dynasty, seeing them nothing more than former vassals and servants of their Goguryeo ancestors and that of themselves until the advent of Wuyashu.

=== Arguments regarding recognition from foreign dynasties ===
China, Japan, and other foreign states during medieval times acknowledged the legitimate succession by Korean dynasties such as Goryeo and Joseon of Goguryeo and viewed them as its rightful successors. Such is evidenced in records and scripts.

- During diplomatic talks on the onset of the Goryeo-Khitan Wars, Sŏ Hŭi told the Liao commander Xiao Xunning (蕭遜寧, ? ~ 997): "Our country is in fact former Goguryeo. Which is why it is named Goryeo and Pyongyang as its capital. If you want to discuss territorial boundaries of old, the Eastern Capital of your country would be within our borders."
- Xu Jing (徐兢, 1091–1153) of the Northern Song dynasty makes it clear that Goryeo was the continuation and equivalent of Goguryeo through his texts written in the Gaoli-tujing (高麗圖經). He illustrates the history of the royal family of Goryeo and states that the people re-founded their nation once again after the decline of their predecessors.
- Chinese historical texts, particularly the dynastic historical records of Chinese dynasties, repeatedly describe Goguryeo as a part of Korean history rather than Chinese history and confirm the succession of Goguryeo by Goryeo. For example, in the Yuanshi, Ming Chinese historians describe the succession of Goguryeo by Later Goguryeo and Goryeo as follows: "The King's family name was Ko. His country fell during the Ganfeng era of tha Tang. After the Chuigong era, his descendants received titles, and gradually became independent. In the Five Dynasties (Five Dynasties and Ten Kingdoms period), they moved the country to Songak and raised a King, whose family name is Wang and first name is Geon." Another example is the Mingshi, where Qing Chinese historians describe the succession of Goguryeo by Goryeo and subsequent unification of the Later Three Kingdoms as follows: "Ko, from the Buyeo people, founded a country in the land at the end of the Han dynasty and named it Goryeo or Goguryeo, and lived in Pyeongyang...but was later defeated and forced to move east. During the Later Tang, Wang Kŏn succeeded Go, absorbed Silla and Baekje and moved the capital to Songak." As historian Lee Soon Keun notes, "The Jiuwudaishi was written in 973, the Songshi, Liaoshi and Jinshi in 1344, while the Mingshi was finished in 1739... The above records (which are the dynastic histories of Chinese empires) all acknowledge that Goryeo had succeeded Goguryeo. In 3-1, all the names are recorded as Goryeo except in the last instance, where it was written as Goguryeo, as in the examples mentioned above, which again shows that there was no distinction between Goryeo and Goguryeo. In other words, it is confirmed throughout China's official historical documents written after Tang that China had viewed Goguryeo's history as having been carried on by Goryeo." Lee further notes that the Mingshi and Qingshi also recognize the succession of Goguryeo by Goryeo and clearly described it.
- Kublai Khan regarded Goryeo as the same country as Goguryeo. By the end of the Mongol invasions of Korea, Kublai was in the middle of a power struggle with Ariq Böke, who was residing in Karakorum while Kublai himself was participating in the Chinese campaign. Having the Goryeo crown prince come before him to concede after decades of fighting, Kublai Khan was jubilant and said "Goryeo is a country that long ago even Tang Taizong personally campaigned against but was unable to defeat. But now, its crown prince has come before me, and this be the will of heaven as it is!"
- The Japanese saying, "The Mongol ("Mukuri") and Goguryeo ("Kokuri") demons are coming! (むくりこくり)" has its origins back during the time of the Mongol invasions of Japan. Kokuri is the name of Goguryeo in Japanese and was used as a reference towards Goryeo soldiers that accompanied the Mongols during the invasions.
- Choe Bu of Joseon in 1488 who was stranded in Ming China was asked by a Ming government official "What special skills does your country have that it was able to defeat the Sui and Tang dynasties armies?" Choe Bu replied "Goguryeo had strategic experts and powerful generals who were skilled in military and had soldiers who served their superiors to the death. Therefore, Goguryeo is a small country but defeated the Tianxia's one million soldiers two times. Now, Silla, Baekje, and Goguryeo have become one country, we have abundant products and large land, riches and powerful military, and immeasurable numbers of loyal and wise scholars."

=== Ties with modern day Korea ===
- Goguryeo traditions such as ondol, Korean fortress, Kimchi, Bulgogi, fermented foods (e.g. doenjang, jeotgal, etc., as mentioned in Records of the Three Kingdoms), onggi, etc. are central mainstays of Korean culture. The ondol, a traditional heating technology, was first built and practiced by the Goguryeo people. Chinese records indicate the first ondols existing in Goguryeo. Goryeo has strong claims as the cultural successor of Goguryeo, because it was during the Goryeo dynasty that Ondol technology spread across the entire Korean Peninsula. This is in strong contrast with Sillan rule over the Korean Peninsula, which lasted more than two hundred years yet did not lead to the popularization of Ondol, which did happen during Goryeo. Modern Koreans continue this tradition with the dol bed, or stone bed, a manufactured bed that has the same heating effect as ondol. The dol bed industry is estimated to be worth 100 billion South Korean won, comprising 30 to 40 percent of the entire bed industry in South Korea.
- Martial arts such as Korean Wrestling (Ssireum), traditional dancing, musical instruments (e.g. Janggu, Geomungo), clothing (e.g. Hanbok, gat, etc.), are present in Korean culture. Ancient music from Goguryeo sung down to posterity such as the Song of the Yellow Bird (황조가; 黃鳥歌) still remains to this day. The traditional clothing of Korea, hanbok, traces its originality back to the Goguryeo-style hanboks. Hanbok has its roots in the Goguryeo-style hanbok and its early forms are well depicted in the Goguryeo murals located across North Korea and Manchuria.
- The word "Korea" comes from the word Goryeo, one of successor states of Goguryeo. The term Goryeo itself is the shortened form of Goguryeo first used during the era of King Jangsu of Goguryeo in the 5th century AD. It has become a term to refer to the Korean people later on after Later Silla and Later Baekje were respectively annexed by Goryeo founded by Wang Kŏn.
- Modern Korean is said to have its origins on the Kaesong dialect which later became the standard in Middle Korean after its spread throughout the Goryeo and Joseon dynasties. It was initially spoken in central Korea by the native Goguryeo populace situated there when Kaesong was the capital of Goryeo.
- The affinity for dancing and singing among the commoners is a shared trait that continued on to later Korean dynasties.

== Perspectives by outsiders ==
Alexander Vovin believes Gorguyeo was Koreanic in origin. He pointed to Koreanic loanwords in Jurchen and Manchu, as well as Khitan and argued that the Goguryeo language was the ancestor of Koreanic people, and spread southwards to replace the Japonic languages of the Samhan. James Unger has proposed a similar model on historical grounds.

According to John B. Duncan of UCLA: "For the last 1,000 years, Goguryeo was an important factor in helping modern Korea find its identity. Goguryeo is part of Korean history."

According to Mark Byington of Harvard University, who has followed the debate since 1993, Goguryeo "was clearly not a Chinese state in any sense, as demonstrated abundantly by China's own dynastic histories". Byington says that the Chinese position is "historically indefensible" and "historically flawed", but at the same time has valid reasons, politically (e.g. territorial concerns), and is not as "sinister" as many Koreans believe (i.e., "a prelude to an active aggression against Korea").

Finnish linguist Juha Janhunen believes that it was likely that a "Tungusic-speaking elite" ruled Goguryeo and Balhae, describing them as "protohistorical Manchurian states" and that part of their population was Tungusic, and that the area of southern Manchuria was the origin of Tungusic peoples and inhabited continuously by them since ancient times, and Janhunen rejected opposing theories of Goguryeo and Balhae's ethnic composition.

According to scholar Andrei Lankov: "There is no doubt that the present-day dispute represents a case of retro-projection of modern identities. The real-life Koguryoans would have been surprised or even offended to learn that, in the future, they would be perceived by Koreans as members of the same community as their bitter enemies from Silla. Describing Koguryo as Chinese or Korean is as misleading as, say, describing medieval Brittany as French or English or Irish."

== Validity of claims on ancient history ==
Some scholars analyze empirical evidence through the lens of nationalism and ethnocentrism. Yonson Ahn and Jie-Hyun Lim believe that projecting modern concepts of national territory and identity onto ancient nation states is self-serving.

Yonson says that the Chinese claims on Goguryeo history tend to be centered on territory: because Goguryeo and Balhae shared territories with modern-day China, it is therefore Chinese. Korean arguments tend to stem from ancestry, a common bloodline. Yonson argues both philosophies contradict the exclusivity claim that many scholars try to make for either Korea or China because Goguryeo possessed territories that now are within the borders of North Korea as well as China, and descendants of Goguryeo people live in both Korea and China. She also argues that the strong distinction between "self" and "other" drives many scholars to accept only exclusive possession of history and its artifacts. Disputes over such claims are often laden with terms like "stealing."

== Recent developments ==
The Chinese city of Ji'an has built a Goguryeo museum within walking distance of the Yalu River. One of the major Goguryeo steles is displayed there.

Professor Joon-Young Kang at Hankuk University of Foreign Studies noted that China's interpretation of Koguryo history completely reversed South Korea's positive view on China vis-à-vis the United States. From 1992 until 2015, South Korea and China experienced a surge in positive relations, as each abandoned their traditional Cold War ally (Taiwan and North Korea) and engaged in greater economic, cultural and technological ties. This was further empowered by the two nation's mutual grievances towards Japan due to the atrocities committed by the Empire of Japan during the Second World War, which often led to them jointly filing protests alongside North Korea towards Japan on topics such as the Rape of Nanking and Comfort Women. However, according to Han-Wool Jung, vice-director of the Center for Public Opinion Analysis of the East Asia Institute, the Northeast Project annihilated China's diplomatic accomplishments in South Korea with a stroke.

On the celebration of the 30th anniversary of Korea-China ties, the National Museum of China presented a chronology of Ancient Korean history which only included information about kingdoms like Baekje (18 B.C.-660 A.D.) and Silla (57 B.C.-935 A.D.) which were located on the southern and central parts of the Korean Peninsula, while omitting Goguryeo and Balhae, whose main territories belonged to the current North Korea and some parts of Manchuria, the current Chinese territory. This sparked diplomatic protests and demands of apology from the Republic of Korea, which accused the National Museum of China of tampering the chronology that Korea had initially given to China.

This is raising speculation that Beijing is reactivating its "Northeast Project" that was launched by the Chinese Academy of Social Sciences in 2002.

== See also ==
- China–North Korea relations
- China–South Korea relations
- History of Sino-Korean relations
- Nationalism and historiography
- Nanyue controversies
