= Yeom =

- Hangul: 염
- Hanja: 廉, 閻
- RR: Yeom
- MR: Yŏm

Yeom, also spelled as Yum or Youm, is a Korean surname.

== Notable people ==
=== Notable people of the past ===
- Yŏm Chang, Silla general who is best known for assassinating Jang Bogo
- Yeom Shin-bi (1350–after 1387), King Gongmin's wife and royal consort

=== Notable people of recent times ===
- Yeom Dong-gyun (born 1983), South Korean football goalkeeper
- Yum Dong-kyun (born 1950), South Korean boxer
- Yeom Dong-yeol (born 1961), South Korean politician
- Yeom Han-woong (born 1966), South Korean physicist
- Yeom Hye-ran (born 1976), South Korean actress
- Yeom Hyo-seob, South Korean taekwondo practitioner
- Yum Jung-ah (born 1972), South Korean actress
- Yeom Ki-hun (born 1983), South Korean football player
- Youm Kyoung-youb (born 1968), South Korean former baseball player
- Yeom Sang-seop (1897–1963), South Korean novelist and freedom fighter
- Yeom Seung-suk (born 1982), South Korean novelist
- Andrew Yeom Soo-jung (born 1943), South Korean prelate
- Yeom Yoon-jung, South Korean curler
- Yeom Hye-seon, South Korean volleyball player

== See also ==
- Yan (surname)
- Yum (disambiguation)
