= Ian Tyrrell =

Australian historian (born 1947)

Ian Robert Tyrrell (born 1947) is an Australian historian who is notable for his work on American exceptionalism and transnational history. Tyrrell was Scientia Professor of History at the University of New South Wales, Sydney until his retirement in July 2012 and is now an emeritus Professor of History there. He is the author of twelve books, including True Gardens of the Gods: Californian-Australian Environmental Reform, 1860 –1930 and Historians in Public: The Practice of American History, 1890-1970. His main research areas include American history, environmental history, and historiography. He was among the first historians to popularise the idea of transnational history.

Born in Brisbane, Queensland, Tyrrell completed a BA Honours Degree at the University of Queensland and a PhD at Duke University, where he was a Fulbright Scholar and James B. Duke Fellow. Tyrrell was editor of the Australasian Journal of American Studies from 1991 to 1996, and President of the Australian and New Zealand American Studies Association from 2002 to 2006. Tyrrell is a Fellow of the Australian Academy of the Humanities and was awarded a Commonwealth of Australia Centenary Medal in 2003. He has been a visiting professor at the Ecole des Hautes Etudes en Sciences Sociales in Paris and Joyce Appleby (Visiting) Professor of United States History at the University of California, Los Angeles, in fall 2009. He was the Harold Vyvyan Harmsworth Professor of American History in the University of Oxford in 2010-11 and was appointed a Professorial Fellow of The Queen's College, Oxford University.

== Bibliography ==
=== Books ===
- Sobering Up: From Temperance to Prohibition in Antebellum America, 1800-1860. Westport, Conn., Greenwood Press. 1979.
- The Absent Marx: Class Analysis and Liberal History in Twentieth-Century America. Westport, Conn., Greenwood Press. 1986.
- Woman’s World/Woman’s Empire: The Woman’s Christian Temperance Union in International Perspective, 1880-1930. Chapel Hill, N.C., University of North Carolina Press. 1991.
- Deadly Enemies: Tobacco and its Opponents in Australia Sydney: University of New South Wales Press, 1999.
- True Gardens of the Gods: Californian-Australian Environmental Reform, 1860-1930. Berkeley: University of California Press. 1999.
- Alcohol and Temperance in Modern History, ed. Jack Blocker, David Fahey, and Ian Tyrrell, 2 vols. Santa Barbara, Calif.: ABC-CLIO. 2003.
- Historians in Public: The Practice of American History, 1890-1970. Chicago: University of Chicago Press. 2005.
- Transnational Nation: United States History in Global Perspective since 1789 . Basingstoke, Eng.: Palgrave Macmillan. 2007.
- Reforming the World: The Creation of America’s Moral Empire. Princeton, NJ: Princeton University Press. 2010.
- Crisis of the Wasteful Nation: Empire and Conservation in Theodore Roosevelt’s America. Chicago: University of Chicago Press. 2015. Shortlisted for the General History Prize, New South Wales Premier's History Awards 2015.
- Empire’s Twin: U.S. Anti-Imperialism from the Founding Era to the Age of Terrorism, edited with Jay Sexton. Ithaca: Cornell University Press 2015.
- River Dreams: The People and Landscape of the Cooks River, NewSouth Publishing, 2018.
- American exceptionalism : a new history of an old idea. Chicago: University of Chicago Press. 2021.

=== Articles and book chapters ===
- “Women and Temperance in Antebellum America, 1830-1860,” Civil War History, Vol. 28 (Summer 1982), pp. 128–52.
- “Drink and Temperance in the Antebellum South: An Overview and Interpretation,” Journal of Southern History, Vol. 48, November 1982, pp. 485–510.
- “International Aspects of the Woman’s Temperance Movement in Australia: The Influence of the American WCTU, 1882-1914,” Journal of Religious History, Vol. 12, June 1983, pp. 284–304.
- “American Exceptionalism in an Age of International History,” American Historical Review, Vol. 96 October 1991, pp. 1031–55; 1068–72.
- “Prohibition, American Cultural Expansion, and the New Hegemony in the 1920s: An Interpretation,” Histoire Sociale/Social History, Vol. 27 November 1994, pp. 413–45
- “Peripheral Visions: Californian-Australian Environmental Contacts, c. 1850s-1910,” Journal of World History, Vol. 8 September 1997, pp. 275–302.
- “The US Prohibition ‘Experiment’: Myths, History, and Implications,” Addiction, Vol. 92 No. 11, 1997. pp. 1405-1409.
- “Making Nations/Making States: American Historians in the Context of Empire,” Journal of American History, Vol. 86 Dec. 1999. pp. 1015–44.
- “The Limits of Persuasion: Advertising, Gender and the Culture of Australian Smoking,” Australian Historical Studies, No. 114 April. 2000. pp. 27–47.
- “The Great Historical Jeremiad: The Problem of Specialization in American Historiography,” History Teacher, Vol. 33 May 2000. pp. 371–93.
- “Beyond the View from Euro-America: Environment, Settler Societies and Internationalisation of American History,” in Thomas Bender, ed., Rethinking American History in a Global Age. Berkeley: University of California Press. 2002. pp. 168–92.
- “Modern Environmentalism,” in Roy Rosenzweig and Jean-Christophe Agnew, eds., The Blackwell’s Companion to Post-1945 American History. Oxford: Basil Blackwell. 2002. pp. 328–42.
- “Rethinking American Empire in the Light of the Events of September 11,” Australasian Journal of American Studies, 21 December. 2002. pp. 76–82
- “The Challenge of De-provincializing US History in World War Two,” in “Internationalizing U.S. History,” ed. Dirk Hoerder, Amerikastudien / American Studies 48.1 (Spring 2003), pp. 41–59
- “Acclimatisation and Environmental Renovation: Australian Perspectives on George Perkins Marsh,” Environment and History. 10, No. 2, May 2004. pp. 153–66.
- “Historians and Publics in the Early Televisual Age: Academics, Film and the Rise of Television in the 1950s and 1960s,” The Maryland Historian, 30, Spring 2006. pp. 41–60.
- “The ‘Nature’ of Environmental History: New Views from the Pacific,” in Pierre Lagayette, ed., Nature et Progrès: Interactions, exclusions et mutations. Paris: Presses de l’Université Paris-Sorbonne. 2006. pp. 11-31.
- “American Exceptionalism and Anti-Americanism,” in Brendon O’Connor, ed., Anti-Americanism: History, Causes, and Themes. Vol. 2: Historical Perspectives. Oxford: Greenwood World Publishing. 2007. 99–117.
- “American Exceptionalism and Uneven Global Integration: Pushes Away from the Global Society,” in Bruce Mazlish, Nayan Chanda and Kenneth Weisbrode, eds., The Paradox of a Global USA. Stanford, CA: Stanford University Press. 2007. pp. 64–80.
- “Public at the Creation: Place, Memory and Historical Practice in the Mississippi Valley Historical Association,” Journal of American History, 94, June 2007. pp. 19–47.
- “Confronting the ‘E’ Word: American Empire and Transnational History,” Australasian Journal of American Studies, vol. 26, July 2007. pp. 41-53.
- “Charles and Mary Beard,” in Darity, William A. Jr., International Encyclopedia of the Social Sciences, 2nd edition. 9 vols. Detroit: Macmillan Reference USA. 2008. Vol. 1. pp. 268–269.
- “Looking Eastward: Pacific and Global Perspectives on American History in the Nineteenth and Early Twentieth Centuries,” Japanese Journal of American Studies, No. 18, 2007. pp. 41–57.
- “Environment, Landscape and History: Gardening in Australia,” Australian Historical Studies, No. 130, October 2007, pp. 389–97.
- “Transatlantic Progressivism in Women’s Temperance and Suffrage,” in David Gutzke, ed., Britain and Transnational Progressivism. Palgrave Macmillan. 2008. pp. 134–48.
- “Empire in American History,” in Alfred W. McCoy and Francisco A. Scarano, eds., Colonial Crucible: Empire in the Making of the Modern American State. Madison: University of Wisconsin Press. 2009. pp. 541–56.
- “The Scholarly Odyssey of an Activist Historian: Alan Dawley in Historiography,” Journal of the Gilded Age and Progressive Era, 8 (No. 1, 2009), 29–49.
- “Reflections on the Transnational Turn in United States History: Theory and Practice,” Journal of Global History, 3 (November 2009), pp. 453–474.
- “Woman, Missions, and Empire: New Approaches to American Cultural Expansion,” in Barbara Reeves-Ellington, Kathryn Kish Sklar, and Connie Shemo, eds., Competing Kingdoms: Women, Mission, Nation, and American Empire, 1812–1960. Durham, NC: Duke University Press. 2010. pp. 51–83.
- “Continuities in American Empire: The Nineteenth-Century Inheritance and the Return Of History” in Priscilla Roberts, Mei Renyi, and Yan Xunhua, eds., China Views Nine-Eleven: Essays in Transnational American Studies. Newcastle upon Tyne: Cambridge Scholars Publishing. 2011. pp. 95–110.
- “Historical Writing in the United States,” Oxford History of Historical Writing, vol. 5, ed. Axel Schneider and Daniel Woolf. Oxford: Oxford University Press. 2011. pp. 473–95.
- “America’s National Parks: The Transnational Creation of National Space in the Progressive Era,” Journal of American Studies 46, no. 1, January 2012. pp. 1–21.
- “The Space and Time of Transnational History,” Keynote Address, German American Studies Association Annual Conference, in Udo Hebel, ed., Transnational American Studies, American Studies Monograph Series. Heidelberg: Universitätverlag Winter, 2012. pp. 75–96.
- “Missionary Movements,” in The Oxford Encyclopedia of American Military and Diplomatic History. New York: Oxford University Press. 2013. pp. 698–704.
- “The Myth(s) That Will Not Die: American National Exceptionalism,” in Gérard Bouchard, ed., Constructed Pasts, Contested Presents. New York: Routledge. 2013. pp. 46–64.
- “Anti-Americanism Historicized,” Reviews in American History, 41, September 2013. pp. 445–450.
- “From the Wet and Mud of Newcastle: Reflections on ANZASA and U.S. History in Australia, 1974-2012,” Australasian Journal of American Studies, 32, July 2013. pp. 62–79.
- “Review Essay: Bernhard Gissibl, Sabine Höhler and Patrick Kupper (editors), Civilizing Nature: National Parks in Global Historical Perspective,” ENNZ: Environment and Nature in New Zealand, 8, No 1 November 2013, pp. 49–58.
- “Die US-amerikanische Missionsexpansion und der Aufstieg des amerikanischen »Empires« im späten 19. Jahrhundert,” In Judith Große, Francesco Spöring, Jana Tschurenev (eds.) Biopolitik und Sittlichkeitsreform Kampagnen gegen Alkohol, Drogen und Prostitution 1880 – 1950. Frankfurt am Main: Campus Verlag. 2014. pp. 49-81.
- “Débat autour d’un livre,” (Reforming the World: the Creation of America's Moral Empire de Ian Tyrrell) with Rebekka Habermas, Rui Kohiyama, Mark Elliott, Monde(s), no. 6, Novembre 2014. pp. 148–168.
- with Jay Sexton, “Introduction,” in Ian Tyrrell and Jay Sexton, eds., Empire’s Twin: U.S. Anti-Imperialism from the Founding Era to the Age of Terrorism. Ithaca: Cornell University Press, 2015. pp. 1–18.
- with Jay Sexton, “Whither American Anti-imperialism in a Post-Colonial World?,” in Ian Tyrrell and Jay Sexton, eds., Empire’s Twin: U.S. Anti-Imperialism from the Founding Era to the Age of Terrorism. Ithaca: Cornell University Press. 2015. pp. 219–42.
- “Resource Use, Conservation, and the Environmental Limits of Anti-Imperialism,” in Ian Tyrrell and Jay Sexton, eds., Empire’s Twin: U.S. Anti-Imperialism from the Founding Era to the Age of Terrorism. Ithaca: Cornell University Press. 2015. pp. 167–84.

=== Critical studies and reviews of Tyrrell's work ===
American exceptionalism

- Shortis, Emma (October 2022). "Flares and embers : a richly detailed analysis of American exceptionalism". Australian Book Review. 447: 26–27.
