= Politics, Religion & Ideology =

- Discipline: Political science, history
- Language: English
- Edited by: Naveed S. Sheikh

Publication details
- Former names: Totalitarian Movements and Political Religions
- History: 2000–present
- Publisher: Taylor & Francis
- Frequency: Quarterly

Standard abbreviations
- ISO 4: Politics Relig. Ideol.

Indexing
- ISSN: 2156-7689 (print); 2156-7697 (web)
- OCLC no.: 652466953

Links
- Journal homepage; Online access; Online archive

Politics, Religion & Ideology is a quarterly peer-reviewed academic journal covering research on the politics and history of illiberal and radical ideologies, both religious and secular. It is published by Taylor & Francis. The editor-in-chief is Naveed S. Sheikh (Keele University).

== Scope ==
The journal publishes critical analyses of theory and international case studies pertaining to religious radicalism and public policy, totalitarian movements and illiberal ideologies such as fascism, Nazism, Stalinism, Maoism, and Ba'athism, political religions and political ideologies, dissent, and politics of memory.

== History ==
It was established in 2000 as Totalitarian Movements and Political Religions. The founding editor was English historian Michael Burleigh, who is known for his study of Nazi Germany and political religion. He expresses his fundamental debts to earlier antitotalitarian thinkers including Eric Voegelin, Raymond Aron, and Waldemar Gurian. The journal marked a new surge of interest in totalitarianism in the 1990s.

The journal obtained its current name in 2011.

== Abstracting and indexing ==
The journal is abstracted and indexed in Arts and Humanities Citation Index, Social Sciences Citation Index, Scopus, EBSCOhost (International Political Science Abstracts, Military & Government Collection and Political Science Complete), Sociological Abstracts, CSA Worldwide Political Science Abstracts, and International Bibliography of the Social Sciences.

== See also ==
- Political religion
