= Transnational history =

Transnational history is an approach in historiography that places emphasis on historical phenomena that are not shaped by nation states such as the movement of people or ideas. According to the historian Akira Iriye, "transnational history may be defined as the study of movements and forces that have cut across national boundaries" in a variety of contexts. Originating in American studies, the term has been applied by historians who seek to avoid taking national history as the "natural" frame for historical analysis but instead look at the past without the framing of the nation state. The redirection of historical studies can be seen as a reaction to the fact that the field of history was founded in the 19th century, when nationalist movements were rising in Europe. The concept has some similarities to global or world history.

== Origins and definitions ==
The idea of "transnationalism" can be traced back to 1991 when Ian Tyrrell pioneered the approach in the field of American studies. It was in the late 1990s that the concept really was developed. Since then, the term has been adopted by the field of history. As the concept is still relatively new with the field of history, a consensus has not emerged on a precise definition of the term. There are many competing concepts that emerged in the works of Sebastian Conrad, Kiran Patel, Thomas Adam, Thomas Bender, Daniel T. Rodgers, and Ian Tyrrell. Akira Iriye and Pierre-Yves Saunier define transnational history as having to do with the "connections and circulations" between societies in the Modern Age. Tyrrell argues that transnational history is related to the Annales School.

== Principles ==
The emergence of transnational history resulted from the growing dissatisfaction among some historians with the study of historical phenomena within the limited and limiting space of nation states. The nation state, which was embraced by many 19th-century historians because of its progressive and liberal nature, in the 20th century turned into an analytical cage and lost much of its explanatory power. Limiting studies to the borders of a nation state led some historians to study only aspects of a given historical subject matter that existed within the chosen and artificial national space and caused historians to ignore the complex body of the phenomenon that existed outside of it. According to transnational historians, most historical phenomena did not exist within one national space but grew just like a tree that develops roots and branches, which stretch and extend into the spaces of other countries, empires and nations. Studying such phenomena within the space of just one nation always meant to study just one branch or limb cut off from its body.

Transnational history is based on the fundamental belief that human activities across the globe are interconnected. Inventions developed in one place, minerals unearthed in another and plants cultivated in yet another place raced across the globe and influenced the creation of cultures and societies in places far away from their point(s) of origin.

Transnational history not only contributes to the denationalization and deterritorialization of history but also champions a history that is focused on non-state actors. Individuals and non-state actors are often at the center of transnational history accounts. For example, actors rooted in urban civil society and voluntary associations played a vital part in the most widespread series of revolutions in Europe in 1848. Drawing on political ideas circulating in a pan-European reading public, the same political ideas and agendas were put to use by activists across European cities in different urban contexts giving urban revolutions across states more similarities than the revolutionary activities in the countryside of the same state. That has caused the concept of transurban interconnectivities to be proposed as the most precise concept to capture the nature of the profound interconnectivity between revolutionary movements in 1848. It further insists on the decentering of history, which has all too often been written from a Eurocentric point of view, which came with the imposition of chronologies and turning points in Asian countries that have little meaning to them. Decentering thus also means the creation of new and even multiple chronologies.

== See also ==
- World history

== Sources ==
- Patel, Klaus Kiran, Transnational History, EGO – European History Online, Mainz: Institute of European History, 2010, retrieved: 4 March 2020 (pdf).
- Ian Tyrrell (2007) Transnational Nation. United States History in Global Perspective since 1789. Basingstoke: Palgrave Macmillan.
- Nils Arne Sørensen (2009) "Den transnationale vending?"i Historisk Tidsskrift Volume 109, Issue 2: 459–472.
- Thomas Adam, "Transnational History: A Program for Research, Publishing, and Teaching," in: Yearbook of Transnational History vol. 1 (2018): 1–10.
- Kończal, Kornelia (2023), Ein archivalischer Zufallsfund mit beträchtlichen Folgen: „Étienne Tchernowsky“, Durkheimianer und die transnationale Geschichte, in: Thomas Serrier und Katja Makhotina (ed.): ZwischenWelten. Grenzüberschreitungen europäischer Geschichte, Darmstadt, WBG Academic, p. 247–261.
