= Yeom Seungsuk =

South Korean novelist

Yeom Seung-suk
- 염승숙
- Born: 1982 (age 43–44); Seoul, South Korea
- Education: Dongguk University
- Occupation: Novelist
- Years active: 2005–present
- Notable work: Baemkkoriwangjwi (2005): Chaplin, Chaplin (2008); No Future and the Speed of an Excavator: Criticism on Time of a City by Park Sol-moe (2017)

Yeom Seung-suk (Korean: 염승숙; born 1982) is a South Korean novelist. From 2005, she has steadily published literary works as a novelist, and has also been working as a literary critic since 2017.

In 2005, she made her formal debut piece called Baemkkoriwangjwi, which gave her an accolade for New Writers’ Award for the Hyundae Munhak magazine. Since then, she has made more stories: most notably Chaplin, Chaplin in 2008; Nowhere Man in 2013 and Let's Not Be Here in 2018. Her novels deal with the desperate realities facing ordinary people in contemporary society and the issue of lost identity, in magical and fantastical narratives.

== History ==
=== 1982–2005: Early life and education ===
Yeom was born in Seoul, South Korea in 1982. During childhood, she would repeatedly read an anthology of Korean contemporary stories and imagine their backstories. To pursue her dream of becoming a novelist, she studied creative writing in college. During her college years, she used to recall her favorite Korean authors and write literary pieces as if she were one of those writers. Then, during her days of practising literature, she used to carry a Korean dictionary with her and memorize words as if she were studying a foreign language, or sometimes she used to invent her own words. Before her formal literary debut, Yeom had already won several literary awards from her own college, which made her professors call her yeomjak (“author Yeom”).

She later graduated Dongguk University with a degree in literature and got her PhD in the Department of Korean Language and Literature.

=== 2005–present: Taking on story writing ===
Yeom made her literary debut in 2005 by publishing a short story entitled Baemkkoriwangjwi, (Note: Hangul: 뱀꼬리왕쥐; lit. The Big Rat with a Snake’s Tail) followed by the anthologies Chaplin, Chaplin (Note: Hangul: 채플린, 채플린; translit. Chaepeullin, chaepeullin) (2008) and Nowhere Man (Note: Hangul: 노웨어맨; translit. Noweeomaen) (2011) as well as the novel Some Countries are Just Too Big (Note: Hangul: 어떤 나라는 너무 크다; translit. Eotteon naraneun neomu keuda) (2013). She also did several other stort stories for collaborative collections to add to her bibliography.

She later resumed her literary writing career with the release of her second novel Let's Not Be Here (Note: Hangul: 여기에 없도록 하자; translit. Yeogie eopdorok haja) in 2018.

=== 2017–present: Career transition to a critic and further acclaim ===
In 2017, Yeom began her career as a literary critic. According to her, she gradually came to write literary criticisms because she continued to read works of other authors and asked herself questions as a reader. Her debut work No Future and the Speed of an Excavator: Criticism on Time of a City by Park Sol-moe (Note: Hangul: 없는 미래와 굴착기의 속도-박솔뫼 《도시의 시간》론; translit. Eomneun miraewa gulchakgiui sokdo-baksolmoe 《dosiui sigan》ron) received positive critical reviews for its firm critical consciousness of and serious interest in issues facing younger generations of Koreans who cannot expect any stable future.

=== Other activities ===
Yeom has also been actively engaged in diverse fields outside the literary world of writing novels and criticisms. To begin with, she attended graduate school and studied Korean literature, receiving a master's degree for her study on post-Korean War writings of author Han Moo-sook.

Since 2017, she has been hosting a podcast show entitled Table Talk by Novelists Yeom Seungsuk and Yun Ko Eun. (Note: Hangul: 소설 쓰는 윤고은, 염승숙의 테이블) Yeom says that she launched this podcast show because she wanted to ‘communicate with aspiring writers and readers about novel writing’ as she previously had many concerns about how to write a novel before becoming an author herself.

== Writing style ==
Yeom's writing style has been described as it mixing fantasy and reality by Kim Gyeong-yeon.

Kim states this by writing, "Yeom's novels are characterized by fantastical narratives that unfold situations that are impossible in ordinary realities. Yet, the fantasies in her novels are not that far removed from our realities. In them, fantasy and reality coexist without discomfort, their boundaries ambiguous." Kim also points out that the author asks fundamental questions about human existence, including Who am I?, Do I really exist here and now?, If so, how can I prove this? through such novelistic strategies and that if her novels contain any truth, it will be the fact that we cannot be certain about any truth at all. By immersing themselves in her stories that are amalgamations of fantasy and reality, readers come to ask themselves about what kind of world we live in and who we are as beings living in such a world.

=== Short story collections ===
The characters in Chaplin, Chaplin (2008) are all nobodies, with almost no presence. They have ordinary jobs, for instance, as a public servant working at a city hall, a real estate agent, and a physical therapist. They lead an oppressed existence burdened by repetitive daily routines. Then one day, strange, fantastical things happen to them: They come across a big rat with the tail of a snake, which pursues human tailbones, their teeth are replaced by the bones of an iguanodon, and a strange plague, which paralyzes one's body fixed in a slanting position, breaks out. These bizarre circumstances provide them with opportunities to restore identities that were gradually lost in familiar daily routines.

Similarly, in Nowhere Man (2011), fantastical accidents, such as metamorphosis, the disappearance of a person and the outbreak of an epidemic, occur commonly. However, unlike in Chaplin, Chaplin, the realities facing characters in this novel are much more realistic. Most of them are those excluded from social safety nets, such as a bankrupt debtor, an irregular worker, a person removed from the resident registration. For these characters, who were alienated from a society filled with cutthroat competitions, survival is much more important that moral issues such as truth and lies, the good and the evil. A sense of crisis felt by these individuals on the verge of a devastating end do not stay as their personal experiences but spread to an ever-increasing number of people. In this respect, according to Jeong Ju-a, Yeom's novels approach the invisible crisis looming from each individual's daily life and inner self as a common phenomenon occurring throughout the entire society.

=== Novels ===
Yeom's critical consciousness of issues in ordinary people's lives later leads to her satirical novels. In Some Countries are Just Too Big, she creates Bingo World consisting of too big a world and too small humans. In Bingo World, managed by a large construction firm, people live standardised lives as equally shaped Bingo pieces. The novel also contains an allegory of controversial Korean political incidents, such as the 2012 NIS public opinion manipulation scandal. One notable anonymous reviewer said the literary devices "effectively satirize the social conditions of this age that constantly shake one’s individual identity".

In Let's Not Be Here, adults who do not work turn into hams. Every day, television news reports on "today’s ham" as if it were a weather forecast, with subtitles detailing the information on unidentified hams. Fearing that they can turn into hams, then dried, twisted and crushed, people are unable to quit their labor even though they experience unfair treatment or get injured. Instead, they desperately continue their labor as if the avoidance of becoming a ham were their life's goal. In this respect, against the backdrop of such dystopia, Yeom contemplates on what it means for a human to make money and sustain their living in this capitalist society while asking how humans should exist in this world that defies any predictions on the future.

== Bibliography ==
=== Anthologies ===
Translated English title	Original Korean title	Year	Publisher
Chaplin, Chaplin	Hangul: 채플린, 채플린; translit. Chaepeullin, chaepeullin	2008	Munhakdongne Publishing Group
Nowhere Man	Hangul: 노웨어맨; translit. Noweeomaen	2011	Moonji Publishing Co., Ltd
And the Remaining Things	Hangul: 그리고 남겨진 것들; translit. Geurigo namgyeojin geotdeul	2014	Munhakdongne Publishing Group

=== Novels ===
Translated English title	Original Korean title	Year	Publisher
Some Countries are Just Too Big	Hangul: 어떤 나라는 너무 크다; translit. Eotteon naraneun neomu keuda	2013	Hyundae Munhak
Let's Not Be Here	Hangul: 여기에 없도록 하자; translit. Yeogie eopdorok haja	2018	Munhakdongne Publishing Group

=== Themed short story collections, co-written works, and other collections ===
Translated English title	Original Korean title	Story genre	From which collection	Year	Publisher	Written with
The Cat Who Shakes a Birch Tree	Hangul: 자작 나무를 흔드는 고양이; translit. Jajang namureul heundeuneun goyangi	Short story part of a bigger collection	Cat Cat Cat (Korean: 캣캣캣; RR: Kaetkaetkaet)	2010	Hyundae Munhak	Tae, Gi-su et al.
It Hurts in the End	Hangul: 결국엔, 아픈 것; translit. Gyeolgugen, apeun geot	Short story part of a bigger collection	Impossible Conversations (Korean: 불가능한 대화들; RR: Bulganeunghan daehwadeul)	2011	Sanjini	Kim, I-seol et al.
Meeting the World of Warm Jokes	Hangul: 따뜻한 농담들의 세계와 만나다; translit. Ttatteutan nongdamdeurui segyewa mannada	Short story part of a bigger collection	Impossible Conversations (Korean: 불가능한 대화들; RR: Bulganeunghan daehwadeul)	2011	Sanjini	Kim, I-seol et al.
Caring	Hangul: 마음을 쓰는 일; translit. Maeumeul sseuneun il	Short story part of a bigger collection	Author and the Cat (Korean: 작가와 고양이; RR: Jakgawa goyangi)	2016	Fox Corner	Yun I-hyeong et al.

=== Children’s books ===
Translated English title	Original Korean title	Year	Publisher	Illustrated by
SOS Scientific Investigation Squad 2: A Journey to the Age of Dinosaurs	Hangul: SOS 과학 수사대 2: 공룡 시대에 가다; translit. SOS Gwahak Susadae 2: Gongnyong Sidaee Gada	2009	Aijeul	Kim Su-hyeon
SOS Scientific Investigation Squad 3: Save Seoul Pond Frogs!	Hangul: SOS 과학 수사대 3: 금개구리를 구하라; translit. SOS Gwahak Susadae 3: Geumgaegurireul Guhara	2009	Aijeul	Kim Ryeong-eon

== Awards ==
- Hyundae Munhak Magazine New Writer's Award (현대문학 신춘문예) (2005) for “Baemkkoriwangjwi” (뱀꼬리왕쥐 The Big Rat with a Snake's Tail)
- Kyunghyang Daily News New Writer's Award (2017) for “Eomneun miraewa gulchakgiui sokdo-baksolmoe 《dosiui sigan》ron” (없는 미래와 굴착기의 속도-박솔뫼 《도시의 시간》론 No Future and the Speed of an Excavator: Criticism on Time of a City by Park Sol-moe)
