= Northeast Project =

2002–2007 Chinese history project

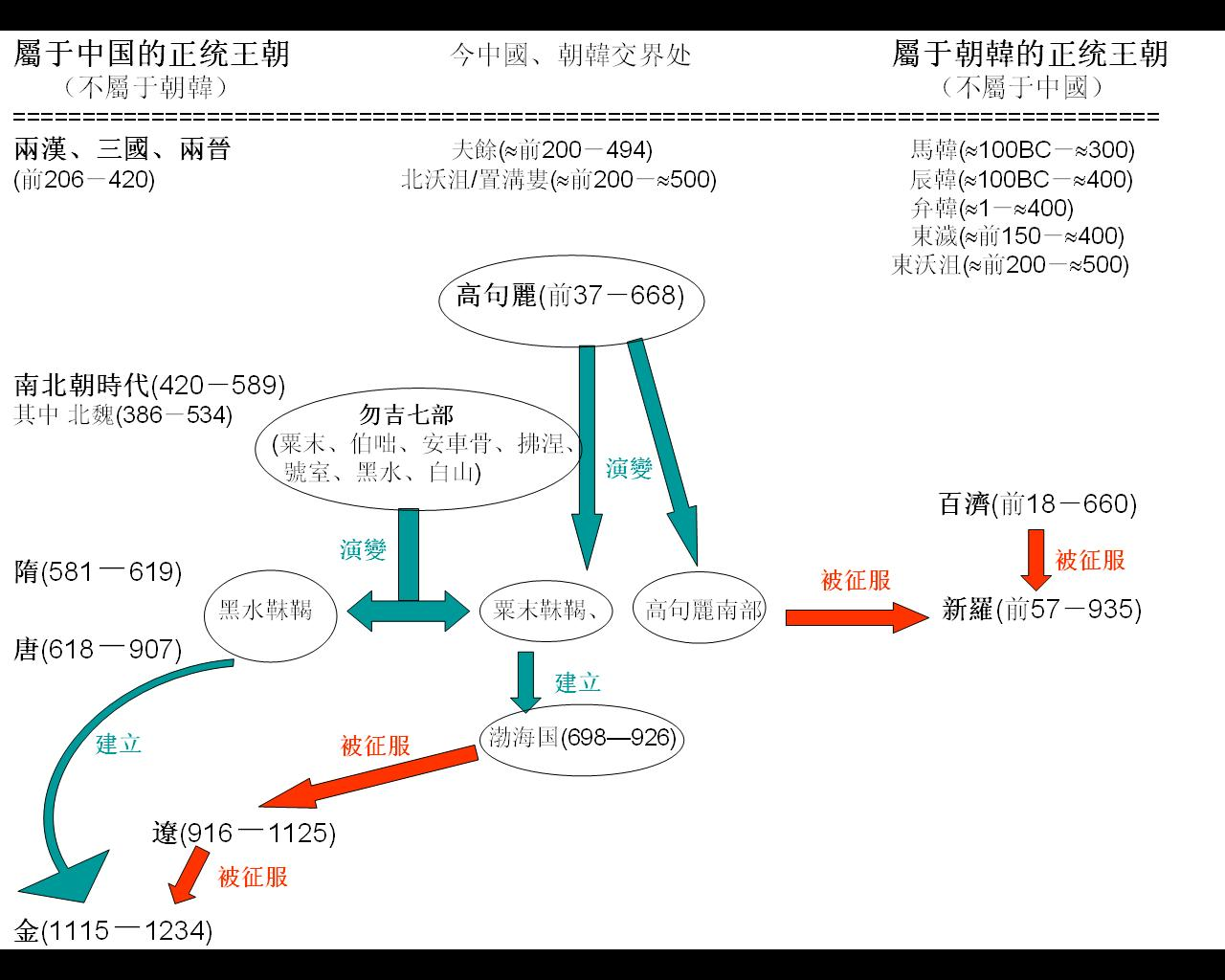
outline of research outputs

The Northeast Project (simplified Chinese: 东北工程; traditional Chinese: 東北工程), which is short for the Serial Research Project on the History and Current State of the Northeast Borderland (simplified Chinese: 东北边疆历史与现状系列研究工程; traditional Chinese: 東北邊疆歷史與現狀系列研究工程), was a five-year research project on the history and current situation of the frontiers of Northeast China which lasted from 2002 to 2007. It was launched by the Chinese Academy of Social Sciences (CASS) and received financial support from both the Chinese government and the CASS.

The stated purpose of the Northeast Project was to use authoritative academic research to restore historical facts and protect the stability of Northeast China—a region sometimes known as Manchuria—in the context of the strategic changes that have taken place in Northeast Asia since China's Reform and Opening started in 1978. Two Chinese leaders of the project accused some foreign scholars and institutions of rewriting history to demand territory from China or to promote instability in the frontier regions, hence the necessity of the Project.

The Project has been criticized for applying the contemporary vision of China as a "unified multiethnic state" to ancient ethnic groups, states, and history of the region of Manchuria and northern Korea. According to this idea, there was a greater Chinese state in the ancient past. Accordingly, any pre-modern people or state that occupied any part of what is now the People's Republic of China is defined as having been part of Chinese history. Similar projects have been conducted on Tibet and Xinjiang, which have been named Southwest Project and Northwest Project, respectively.

Due to its claims regarding Gojoseon, Goguryeo and Balhae, the project sparked disputes with South Korea. In 2004, this dispute threatened to lead to diplomatic disputes between the China and South Korea, although all governments involved seem to exhibit no desire to see the issue damage relations.

The Northeast Project advocated that Goguryeo and other Northeastern ethnic groups belonged to the local minority, non-Han, ethnic regime in ancient China. It argued that there is no relationship between Goguryeo and the Goryeo regime and that there is no relationship between Goguryeo and the current North Korean regime. The project also argued that there is no relationship between Goguryeo and the current Korean regime. The Northeast Project argued that the main part of Goguryeo has been integrated into the Chinese nation (Han and minority nationalities), while its branches may be integrated into the current Korean nation.

== Organization ==
The Northeast Project was approved in 2001. Its first organizational meeting was held in Changchun (Jilin province) in June 2001 between representatives of the Chinese Academy of Social Science (CASS) and delegates from the Politburo of the Communist Party of Jilin Province, but the five-year project officially began in February 2002. The "Second Academic Conference on the History and Current State of the Northeast and on Goguryeo" (第二届东北边疆历史与现状暨高句丽学术研讨会) was held in Changchun in July 2002, organized by the "Research Center for Chinese Borderland History and Geography" (中国边疆史地研究中心; part of the CASS) and the Jilin Academy of Social Sciences, and supported by ten more academic institutions from the Northeast Chinese provinces of Jilin, Heilongjiang, and Liaoning.

Two articles unrelated to the Northeast Project claim that the Project had a budget of "an astounding 20 billion yuan" (3.21 billion US dollars), or about "three trillion Korean won."

== Background ==
In 1982 the Constitution of China was amended to redefine the People's Republic of China as a "unitary multiethnic state built up jointly by the people of all its ethnicities" (中华人民共和国是全国各族人民共同缔造的统一的多民族国家). Inspired by such concepts, in the 1990s some Chinese historians such as Sun Jinji (孫進己) and Zhang Boquan (張博泉) began to re-identify Goguryeo, especially the first half of Goguryeo's history before it moved its capital to the Korean peninsula, as part of the history of China rather than Korea. As early as 1993, the leader of a North Korean delegation attending a historical conference on Goguryeo in China accused Chinese historians of understanding ancient China as coterminous with the PRC, a view he claimed was not backed up by historical evidence. In 2002, the PRC government took the North Korea delegation leader's challenge and initiated the Northeast Project.

China asserted that Goguryeo was an ethnic Tungusic state; and in modern-day China, Tungusic ethnicities like Manchus are citizens of China and viewed as part of China's multi-ethnic historical civilization.

The Northeast Project is part of a series of historical research projects conducted by the Chinese Academy of Social Science, preceded by the Origin of Chinese Civilization Project (Chinese: 中華文明探源工程) and Xia–Shang–Zhou Chronology Project. These projects and other subsequent ones such as the Northeast Project are based on the modern idea of Zhonghua Minzu or a "unified multi-ethnic state", which conceives ancient China in terms of the territorial bounds of the modern Chinese state. This has led to numerous historical research projects by the Chinese Academy of Social Sciences on areas near the Chinese border, where historical territory overlaps with contemporary neighbors. This includes Manchuria and the Korean Peninsula, which comprise the contemporary territories of the Democratic People's Republic of Korea, People's Republic of China, the Republic of Korea, and the Russian Federation (Siberia).

The Northeast Project consists of research on historical kingdoms, polities and ethnicities in this area, and also modern issues such as territorial disputes and immigration. Pre-modern historical kingdoms and polities covered in the Northeast Project are in chronological order: Gojoseon, Buyeo, Goguryeo, Baekjae, Balhae, Yuan dynasty, Ming dynasty, Joseon and Qing dynasty. Modern historical and contemporary states covered by the Northeast Project are the Empire of Japan, the Soviet Union, South and North Korea and the PRC. Research in the Northeast Project has claimed Gojoseon, Bueyo, Goguryeo and Balhae as regional governments of the ancient Chinese empire. This contrasts with other historiography, where these kingdoms are considered to be sovereign independent states in Korean history.

== Reactions ==
The Northeast Project's claims on ancient kingdoms that most Koreans consider as part of their own history began to receive wide press coverage in South Korea in 2004, which led to public outrage. The Northeast Project has also received strong criticism from academic experts from South Korea and many other countries including China itself. Controversy mainly focused on Goguryeo, which continues to play a central role in Korean nationalism. The Northeast Project's appropriation of Goguryeo has become a turning point in public perception of China in South Korea and also affected strategic and diplomatic relations between the two countries. In South Korea, the Northeast Project has come to symbolize China's historical revisionism and radical political expansionism and continues to be mentioned even well after the Project was officially concluded in 2007.

However, there are lingering doubts as to whether the Northeast Project is truly finished. According to some Korean scholars, the termination of the Northeast Project is still debatable.

- Local governments of Northeast China are still carrying out the project's legacy with the central government's approval, with signs and pamphlets in many tourist sites that introduce Goguryeo as a local government of a Chinese minority group.
- 2001-2008 Origin of Chinese Civilization Project (Chinese: 中華文明探源工程) is also argued to be a continuation the Northeast Project, attempting to define the Liao River civilization as the root of ancient Chinese civilization instead of the well-known Yellow River civilization. It is deemed controversial as the Liao River civilization includes the representative Hongshan culture (Chinese: 红山文化). Chinese historians have regarded the Hongshan culture to be related with Balhae and other Korean cultures, but this project's attempts at including the Hongshan culture as the source of Chinese ancient history sparked debate with the Korean claims and its sources based on Gojoseon.
- Chinese history education that changed after 2001 History Curriculum Standards, a governmental policy overseeing Chinese history education, have drastically reduced discussion regarding history in the Korean peninsula. Korean scholars make note of the fact that, under the policy of History Program that precede the 2001 History Curriculum Standards, books included historical record that the Sui dynasty invasion of Goguryeo ended in failure and has contributed to the downfall of the Sui dynasty, but now has been deleted. Balhae has also been recorded as one of the local governments of the Tang dynasty, which remains a controversial topic in the Northeast Asian academia.
- The Chinese government's attempts at extending the total length of the Great Wall of China to include the Balhae and Goguryeo castle walls are also interpreted as a continuation of the Northeast Project. While Shanhaiguan (Chinese: 山海關) were confirmed as the east end of the Great Wall before the project, the extension to Heilongjiang (Chinese: 黑龍江省) included Goguryeo and Balhae's territory, which became another source of controversy. The Great Wall of China had been extended again in 2012, exceeding almost twice the original length of the Great Wall. Korean scholars have strongly protested against the repeated alteration of historical details published by the Chinese government. Korean scholars also protest that historical artifacts chiefly in Goguryeo and Balhae territory are being destroyed.

== Legacy ==
After the Northeast Project came under strong criticism in 2004, key members of the Northeast Project, along with other academics in Northeast China, founded the journal History and Geography of Northeast China (Chinese: 东北史地), published by the Jilin Academy of Social Sciences. The journal continued most research formerly conducted by the Northeast Project, and further expanded its research scope to include the historical kingdoms and polities of Lelang Commandery and Silla, both located in the Korean peninsula.

== List of research topics ==
1. General History of Heilongjiang (黑龙江通史)
2. Cultural Research Topics of 20th Century Chinese Northeast Borderland (二十世纪中国东北边疆文化研究课题)
3. 1580 Years of the Gwanggaeto Stele (好太王碑1580年)
4. History of Economic Relationship Between Chinese Northeast and Russia (USSR) from mid-17th century to 1949 (中国东北与俄国（苏联）经济关系史（17世纪中叶—1949年）)
5. History of Balhae (渤海国史)
6. Jizi and Gija Joseon Research (箕子与箕子朝鲜研究)
7. Research on Russian Oriental Migration and Development (俄国东部移民开发问题研究（1861—1917）)
8. Historical Theories of Balhae (渤海史论)
9. History of the Development of Ancient Peoples in Northeastern China (中国东北古民族发展史)
10. Research and Theory on Related Family Names of China and Korea (中韩相关姓氏族源考论)
11. Research on Borderland Policies of Northeastern Region during Republican Era (民国时期东北地方政府治边研究)
12. Issues of Recent International Migration in Chinese Northeastern Region (近代中国东北地区的国际移民问题)
13. Research on Northeastern Policies of Various Chinese Dynasties in History (历朝东北治边研究)
14. Issues Regarding International Law and China-North Korea Border Disputes (国际法与中朝边界争议问题)
15. Detailed Analysis and Research of Samguk Sagi (《三国史记》详注及研究)
16. Research Topics Regarding Han Chinese Demographic History in the Northeast (东北汉族人口史研究课题)
17. Research on Governing of Balhae Immigrants (渤海移民的治理与归属研究)
18. Research on the Restriction and Development of Yalu-river-region during the Qing Dynasty (清代鸭绿江流域的封禁与开发研究)

== Publications ==
The publications of the Northeast Project include at least the following books, which were all published in the "Northeast Borderland Research" (东北边疆研究) series of the Chinese Academy of Social Sciences Press. All titles are in Chinese.

- Geng Tiehua 耿铁华. One Thousand Five Hundred Eighty Years of the Gwanggaeto Stele 好太王碑一千五百八十年祭 (2003).
- Li Dalong 李大龙. Research on the Dependency System in the Han and Tang Dynasties 汉唐藩属体制研究 (2006). ISBN 9787500453758.
- Li Deshan 李德山 and Luan Fan 栾凡. History of the Development of Ancient Nationalities in China's Northeast 中国东北古民族发展史 (2003). ISBN 9787500437642.
- Ma Dazheng 马大正 (editor in chief). Research on China's Northeast Borderlands 中国东北边疆研究 (2003). ISBN 7500437595.
- Ma Dazheng 马大正, Li Dalong 李大龙, Geng Tiehua 耿铁华, and Quan Hexiu 权赫秀. More on the History of Ancient China's Gaogouli 古代中国高句丽历史续论 (2003).
- Wang Xiaoju 王晓菊. Research on Immigration Development in Eastern Russia, 1861–1917 俄国东部移民开发问题研究 (2003). ISBN 7500437714.
- Wei Guozhong 魏国忠, Zhu Guochen 朱国忱, and Hao Qingyun 郝庆云. History of the Bohai State 渤海国史 (2006). ISBN 9787500452515.
- Yang Jun 杨军 (editor in chief). Emergence and Transformation of the Gaogouli Nationality and State 高句丽民族与国家的形成和演变 (2006). ISBN 9787500453741.
- Zhang Fengming 张凤鸣. History of Economic Relations Between China's Northeast and Russia (Soviet Union) 中国东北与俄国(苏联)经济关系史 (2003). ISBN 7500437609.
- Zheng Yongzhen 郑永振, Li Donghui 李东辉, and Yin Xuanzhe 尹铉哲. Historical Theories on Bohai 渤海史论 (2003). ISBN 7547203760.

== See also ==
- History of Korea
- History of China
- China–South Korea relations

== Works cited ==
- Anonymous (2003), "Afterword 后记", in Ma, Dazheng 马大正 (editor-in-chief) (ed.), Research on China's Northeast Frontiers 中国东北边疆研究 (in Chinese), Beijing: Chinese Academy of Social Science Press 中国社会科学出版社, p. 323.
- Byington, Mark (2002), "The Creation of an Ancient Minority Nationality: Koguryo in Chinese Historiography" (PDF), Embracing the Other: The Interaction of Korean and Foreign Cultures, Proceedings of the 1st World Congress of Korean Studies, III. Songnam, Republic of Korea: The Academy of Korean Studies. 23 pages, unpaginated.
- Gries, Peter Hays (2005), "The Koguryo Controversy, National Identity, and Sino-Korean Relations Today" (PDF), East Asia, 22 (4): 3–17, doi:10.1007/s12140-005-0001-y, S2CID 144129470.
- Kim (1), Ji Hoon (2007), "Resolving the conflicts over historical issues between Korea and China : The "Northeast Project" and Chinese historical textbooks 한중 역사갈등 줄이기: 동북공정과 중국의 역사교과서", Critical Studies on Modern Korean History (in Korean), 17: 123–153.
- Kim (2), Taeho (2007), "China's ascendancy and the future of the Korean peninsula", in Nicolas, Françoise (ed.), Korea in the New East Asia: East Asian Integration and the China Factor, London and New York: Routledge, pp. 117–34, ISBN 978-0-415--42006-8.
- Lee, Yun Kuen (2002), "Building the chronology of early Chinese history" (PDF), Asian Perspectives, 41 (1): 15–42, doi:10.1353/asi.2002.0006, hdl:10125/17161, S2CID 67818363.
- Ma, Dazheng (2003), "A Few Issues Concerning the 'Serialized Research Project on the History and Current State of the Northeast Frontiers' 关于'东北边疆历史与现状系列研究工程'的几个问题", in Ma, Dazheng 马大正 (editor-in-chief) (ed.), Research on China's Northeast Frontiers 中国东北边疆研究 (in Chinese), Beijing: Chinese Academy of Social Science Press 中国社会科学出版社.
- Mohan, Pankaj (2011), "Contending Perspectives on Koguryo: A Fresh Look at China's Northeast Project", The Dong Gook Sa Hak, 50: 53–93.
- Pak, Yangjin (2008), "A Comparative Look at Chinese Historical Research Projects: The Xia-Shang-Zhou Chronology Project and the Search for the Origins of Chinese Civilization Project 중국 역사공정의 비판적 검토: 하상주단대공정과 중화문명탐원공정을 중심으로", Critical Review of History, 82: 299–320.
- Seo, Gilsu (2007), "Results and Outlook on the Five-Year's Northeast Asia Project in the People's Republic of China 중화인민공화국 동북공정 5년의 성과와 전망", Koguryeo Balhae Research (in Korean), 29: 13–62.
- Wang, Luolin 王洛林 (2003), "Strengthen Research on the Northeast Frontiers, Stimulate the Building of Academic Disciplines 加强东北边疆研究，促进学科建设", in Ma, Dazheng 马大正 (editor-in-chief) (ed.), Research on China's Northeast Frontiers 中国东北边疆研究 (in Chinese), Beijing: Chinese Academy of Social Science Press 中国社会科学出版社.
- Yoon, Hwy-tak (2004), "China's Northeast Project: Defensive or Offensive Strategy?" (PDF), East Asian Review, 16 (4): 99–121, archived from the original (PDF) on 2012-11-14.
