= Mioyama =

Byeonhan proto-state in ancient Korea

Mioyama (Korean: 미오야마국; Hanja: 彌烏邪馬國; RR: Mioyama) was one of the 12 statelets located in the Byeonhan confederacy during the Proto–Three Kingdoms period of Korea first mentioned in the Records of the Three Kingdoms. Due to its peculiar name, the statelet is used as an example of a possible placename that supports the Peninsular Japonic theory and a possible presence in Korea from ancient Japan.

== History ==
The statelet is believed to have been part of the Byeonhan confederacy after the fall of Wiman Joseon and the division of the Jin state alongside 11 other statelets found in the area.

In early analysis, Korean historians theorized the statelet to have been located in Goryeong County. However, due to evidence alluding to a preexisiting statelet named "Banpa (Korean: 반파국; Hanja: 伴跛國; RR: Banpa)" or more commonly known as Daegaya, this theory is not supported by scholars in recent times.

Despite much speculation and hypothesis, modern historians deduced that Mioyama was located in present-day Changwon.

Not much other than the name and location has been found. However, due to the statelet's territories overlapping with Gaya and Silla, it can be theorized that the people of Mioyama had a similar culture with the aforementioned kingdoms.

== Possible relations with Japan ==
Some Japanese historians link Mioyama with Mimana, one of the names Japan had for Gaya confederacy, theorizing that the name "Mioyama" was carried over to the archipelago which later turned into "Mimana". Historians then extend this theory to claim Japanese presence within the region.

However, Korean historians criticize this argument claiming that the characters for Mimana (任那, "임나/Imna" in Korean) was also widely used within Korea as well found in Samguk Sagi and the Gwanggaeto Stele, and that the term "Mimana" was not confined to Japan at the time. Another criticism lies in the fact that the letter "ma (馬)" found in Mioyama was more of a suffix that was shared by other statelets such as in Jujoma (Korean: 주조마국; Hanja: 走漕馬國; RR: Jujoma). This in turn claims that the real name of Mioyama was in fact "Mioya" which shares heavy resemblance with other statelets that end with "ya (邪)" such as in Guya (Korean: 구야국; Hanja: 狗邪國; RR: Guya) and Anya (Korean: 안야국; Hanja: 安邪國; RR: Anya).

Despite much speculations, a conclusive consensus is yet to be reached.

== Possible relations with Peninsular Japonic ==
Some linguists have pointed out the similarities of the Japanese language and the names of the statelets found in Byeonhan at the time. According to the theory, two of the statelets include a suffix *-mietoŋ ⟨彌凍⟩, which has been compared with Late Middle Korean mith and Proto-Japonic *mətə, both meaning 'base, bottom' and claimed by Samuel Martin to be cognate. Mioyama in particular has a suffix *-jama ⟨邪馬⟩, which is commonly identified with Proto-Japonic *jama 'mountain'.

The Gaya confederacy, which succeeded Byeonhan, maintained trading relations with Japan, until it was overrun by Silla in the early 6th century. A single word is explicitly attributed to the Gaya language, in chapter 44 of the Samguk sagi:

加羅語謂門為梁云。
'In the Gaya language "gate" is called 梁.'

Because the character 梁 was used to transcribe the Silla word ancestral to Middle Korean twol 'ridge', philologists have inferred that the Gaya word for 'gate' had a similar pronunciation. This word has been compared with the Old Japanese word to_{1} 'gate, door'.

== See also ==
- Byeonhan confederacy
- Gaya confederacy
- Silla
- Mimana
- Peninsular Japonic

== Sources ==
- Beckwith, Christopher I. (2004), Koguryo, the Language of Japan's Continental Relatives, Brill, ISBN 978-90-04-13949-7. ISBN 90-04-13949-4, Second edition, 2007.
- Lee, Ki-Moon; Ramsey, S. Robert (2011), A History of the Korean Language, Cambridge University Press, ISBN 978-1-139-49448-9.
- Whitman, John (2011), "Northeast Asian Linguistic Ecology and the Advent of Rice Agriculture in Korea and Japan", Rice, 4 (3–4): 149–158, Bibcode:2011Rice....4..149W, doi:10.1007/s12284-011-9080-0.
