= Peninsular Japonic =

Proposed extinct Japonic language family

- Para-Japonic
- Geographic distribution: Central and southern Korea
- Extinct: 1st millennium CE
- Linguistic classification: Japonic: Peninsular Japonic
- Subdivisions: †Gaya?

Language codes
- Glottolog: None
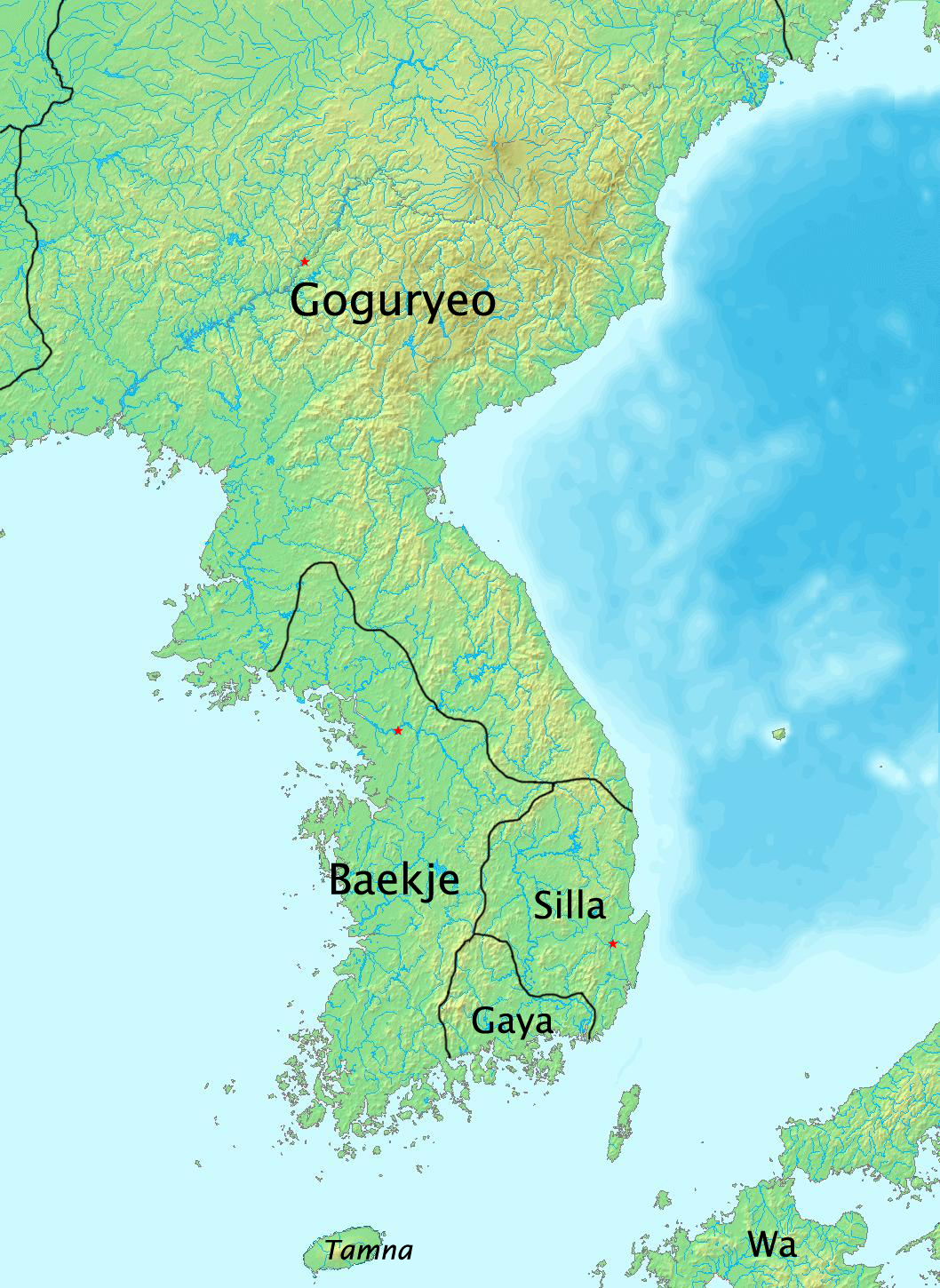
- Korea in the late 4th century

Korean name
- Hangul: 반도 일본어
Transcriptions
- Revised Romanization: bando ilboneo
- McCune–Reischauer: pando ilbonŏ

Japanese name
- Kanji: 大陸倭語
Transcriptions
- Romanization: Tairiku wago

Alternative Japanese name
- Kanji: 半島日本語
Transcriptions
- Romanization: Hantō nihongo

The Peninsular Japonic languages are postulated now-extinct Japonic languages reflected in ancient placenames and glosses from central and southern parts of the Korean Peninsula. (Note: "There is a consensus that at some point a relative of pJR [proto-Japanese–Ryukyuan] was spoken on the Korean peninsula.") Most linguists believe that Japonic arrived in the Japanese archipelago from the Korean peninsula during the first millennium BCE. The placename evidence suggests that Japonic languages were still spoken in parts of the peninsula for several centuries before being replaced by the spread of Korean.

The most-cited evidence comes from chapter 37 of the Samguk sagi (compiled in 1145), which contains a list of pronunciations and meanings of placenames in the former kingdom of Goguryeo. As the pronunciations are given using Chinese characters, they are difficult to interpret, but several of those from central Korea, in the area south of the Han River captured from Baekje in the 5th century, seem to correspond to Japonic words. Scholars differ on whether they represent the language of Goguryeo or the people that it conquered.

Chinese and Korean texts also contain very sparse traces from the states in the south of the peninsula, and from the former Tamna kingdom on Jeju Island.

== Placename glosses in the Samguk sagi ==
The Samguk sagi is a history, written in Classical Chinese, of the Korean Three Kingdoms period, which ended in 668. Chapter 37 gives place names and meanings, mostly for places in the Goguryeo lands seized by Silla. These glosses were first studied by Naitō Torajirō in 1907, with substantial analysis beginning with a series of articles by Ki-Moon Lee in the 1960s.

For example, the following entry refers to the city now known as Suwon:

買忽一云水城
'買忽 one [source] calls "water city"'

That is, the characters 買忽 are used to record the sound of the name, while the characters 水城 represent its meaning. From this, it can be inferred that 買 and 忽 represent the pronunciations of local words for 'water' and 'city' respectively. In this way, a vocabulary of 80 to 100 words has been extracted from these place names. Characters like 買 and 忽 presumably represented pronunciations based on some local version of the Chinese reading tradition, but there is no agreement on what this sounded like. One approximation is to use the Middle Chinese reading pronunciations recorded in such dictionaries as the Qieyun (compiled in 601), in which 買 is pronounced mɛ. Another uses the Sino-Korean readings of 15th century dictionaries of Middle Korean, yielding a pronunciation of moy for the same character. In some cases, the same word is represented by several characters with similar pronunciations.

Several of the words extracted from these names resemble Korean or Tungusic languages. Others, including all four of the attested numerals, resemble Japonic languages, and are accepted by most authors as evidence that now-extinct relatives of Japonic were once spoken on the Korean peninsula. (Note: "From the standpoint of this paper, the important takeaway lesson from the Koguryŏ toponymic data is that a language cognate to Japonic was spoken on the Korean peninsula. This is a point of consensus for all major scholars who have worked on this material.")

Extracted words with possible Japanese cognates
Gloss	Native word			Old Japanese
Gloss	Script	Middle Chinese (Note: There are many equivalent transcriptions for Middle Chinese. Here Middle Chinese forms are given using Baxter's transcription. The letters H and X denote Middle Chinese tone categories.)	Sino-Korean (Note: Korean forms are cited using the Yale romanization of Korean.)	Old Japanese
three	密	mit	mil	mi₁
five	于次	hju-tshij^{H}	wucho	itu
seven	難隱	nan-ʔɨn^{X}	nanun	nana
ten	德	tok	tek	to₂wo
valley	旦	tan^{H}	tan	tani
valley	頓	twon	twon	tani
valley	吞	then	thon	tani
rabbit	烏斯含	ʔu-sje-hom	wosoham	usagi₁
lead	那勿	na-mjut	namwul	namari
water	買	mɛ^{X}	moy	mi₁(du) < *me
water	美	mij^{X}	mi	mi₁(du) < *me
water	彌	mjie^{X}	mi	mi₁(du) < *me

The first authors to study these words assumed that, because these place names came from the territory of Goguryeo, they must have represented the language of that state. Lee and Ramsey offer the additional argument that the dual use of Chinese characters to represent the sound and meaning of the place names must have been done by scribes of Goguryeo, which would have borrowed written Chinese earlier than the southern kingdoms. They argue that the Goguryeo language formed a link between Japanese, Korean and Tungusic.

Christopher I. Beckwith, applying his own Middle Chinese readings, argues that almost all of the words have Japonic cognates. He takes this as the language of Goguryeo, which he considers a relative of Japanese in a family he calls Japanese–Koguryoic. He suggests that the family was located in western Liaoning in the 4th century BC, with one group (identified with the Yayoi culture) travelling by sea to southern Korea and Kyushu, others migrating into eastern Manchuria and northern Korea, and others by sea to the Ryukyu Islands. In a review for Korean Studies, Thomas Pellard criticizes Beckwith's linguistic analysis for the ad hoc nature of his Chinese reconstructions, for his handling of Japonic material and for hasty rejection of possible cognates in other languages. Another review by historian Mark Byington casts doubt on Beckwith's interpretation of the documentary references on which his migration theory is based.

Other authors point out that none of the placenames with proposed Japonic cognates are located in the historical homeland of Goguryeo north of the Taedong River, and no Japonic morphemes have been identified in inscriptions from the area, such as the Gwanggaeto Stele. The glossed place names of the Samguk sagi generally come from central Korea, in an area captured by Goguryeo from Baekje and other states in the 5th century, and suggest that the place names reflect the languages of those states rather than that of Goguryeo. This would explain why they seem to reflect multiple language groups. Kōno Rokurō and Kim Bang-han have argued for bilingualism in Baekje, with the placenames reflecting the language of the common people.

== Other evidence ==
Several authors have suggested that the sole recorded word of the Gaya confederacy is Japonic. Alexander Vovin has suggested Japonic etymologies for several words and placenames from southern Korea appearing in ancient Chinese and Korean texts.

=== Baekje ===
As noted above, several authors believe that the glossed placenames of the Samguk sagi reflect an early language of Baekje. In addition, chapter 54 of the Book of Liang (635) gives four Baekje words, two of which may be compared to Japonic:

- 固麻 ku^{H}mæ 'ruling fortress' vs Old Japanese ko₂m- 'to put inside'
- 檐魯 yemlu^{X} 'settlement' vs Old Japanese ya 'house' and maro₂ 'circle'

=== Silla ===
Some words from Silla and its predecessor Jinhan are recorded by Chinese historians in chapter 30 of Wei Zhi in Records of the Three Kingdoms (3rd century) and chapter 54 of the Book of Liang (completed in 635). Many of these words appear to be Korean, but a few match Japonic forms, e.g. mura (牟羅) 'settlement' vs Old Japanese mura 'village'.

Chapter 34 of the Samguk sagi gives former place names in Silla and the standardized two-character Sino-Korean names assigned under King Gyeongdeok in the 8th century. Many of the pre-reform names cannot be given Korean derivations, but are explicable as Japonic words. For example, several of them contain an element miti (彌知), which resembles Old Japanese mi₁ti 'way, road'.

=== Byeonhan/Gaya ===
The Chinese Records of the Three Kingdoms (3rd century) gives phonographic transcriptions in Chinese characters of names of 12 settlements in the Byeonhan confederacy in southern Korea. Two of these include a suffix *-mietoŋ ⟨彌凍⟩, which has been compared with Late Middle Korean mith and Proto-Japonic *mətə, both meaning 'base, bottom' and claimed by Samuel Martin to be cognate. The name Mioyama has a suffix *-jama ⟨邪馬⟩, which is commonly identified with Proto-Japonic *jama 'mountain'.

The Gaya confederacy, which succeeded Byeonhan, maintained trading relations with Japan, until it was overrun by Silla in the early 6th century. A single word is explicitly attributed to the Gaya language, in chapter 44 of the Samguk sagi:

加羅語謂門為梁云。
'In the Gaya language "gate" is called 梁.'

Because the character 梁 was used to transcribe the Silla word ancestral to Middle Korean twol 'ridge', philologists have inferred that the Gaya word for 'gate' had a similar pronunciation. This word has been compared with the Old Japanese word to₁ 'gate, door'.

=== Tamna ===
Chapter 81 of the Chinese Book of Sui (656) mentions tammura (躭牟羅), an earlier form of the name of the kingdom of Tamna on Jeju Island. (Note: The same passage, describing a Sui mission to Baekje that reached Tamna by mistake, is repeated in the Baekje section of the Dongyi 2 chapter of the Taiping Yulan (977–983) and in chapter 27 of the Samguk sagi.) Vovin suggests that this name may have a Japonic etymology tani mura 'valley settlement' or tami mura 'people's settlement'.

A village in southwestern Jeju called Gamsan (/kamsan/ 'persimmon mountain') has an old name 神山 'deity mountain'. The first character of the place name (神) cannot be read as gam/kam in Korean, but Vovin suggests that the first syllable was originally a word cognate to Old Japanese kami₂ 'deity'.

The Jeju language is Koreanic, but may have a Japonic substratum. For example, the colloquial word kwulley 'mouth' may be connected to the Japonic word *kutu-i 'mouth'.

== Proposed archaeological links ==
Most linguists studying the Japonic family believe that it was brought to the Japanese archipelago from the Korean peninsula around 700–300 BCE by wet-rice farmers of the Yayoi culture. John Whitman and Kazuo Miyamoto associate Japonic on the Korean peninsula with the Mumun culture, which introduced wet-rice agriculture around 1500 BCE. In addition to rice, the onset of the Yayoi culture in northern Kyushu saw the introduction and adaptation of many cultural features from the Mumun culture, including types of housing, pottery and tools. Archaeologists believe this reflects a combination of diffusion, migration from the peninsula, and hybridisation within the archipelago.

Whitman further suggests that Koreanic arrived in the peninsula from the north with the Liaoning bronze dagger culture about 300 BCE. Vovin and James Marshall Unger propose similar models, but associate Koreanic with iron-using mounted warriors from Manchuria. In contrast, Juha Janhunen argues that Koreanic expanded from Silla in the southeast, replacing Japonic languages in Baekje and the rest of the peninsula.
