= Gammun =

Byeonhan confederacy statelet

Gammun also known by its name Gamno, was a statelet of the Byeonhan confederacy located in present-day Gimcheon.

== Historical records and views of historians ==
The earliest records regarding the statelet come from the geographical section of the Samguk Sagi(Book 34), where it says "Gaeryong county, was known as the small country of gammun in the old times, but it changed from Gammun to Gaeryeong after conquered by Silla." The statelet was conquered in 231 by Silla.Donggukyeojiseungram notes that the palace ruins of the statelet used to be in the region, along with the royal tombs. The equivalence of Gammun with Gamno that appears in the Book of Wei in the Records of the Three Kingdoms was approved by 19th-century historian Chŏng Yagyong and 20th-century Korean historian Yi Pyong-do. Twentieth-century Japanese historian Imanishi Ryu(金西龍, 1875~1931) also approved the equivalence despite his position on the theory that the Gaya confederacy was part of Mimana.

== Legacy ==
The regional variant of Nongak is thought to be originally the culture of the country. A legend surrounding a rock that stood during the battles with foreign invaders with the country's general exists in the region.
