= Gaya language =

Presumed language in ancient Korea

Gaya
- Kaya, Karak, Kara
- Native to: Gaya confederacy
- Region: Korea
- Era: 5th–7th centuries
- Language family: Unclassified

Language codes
- ISO 639-3: zra
- Glottolog: None
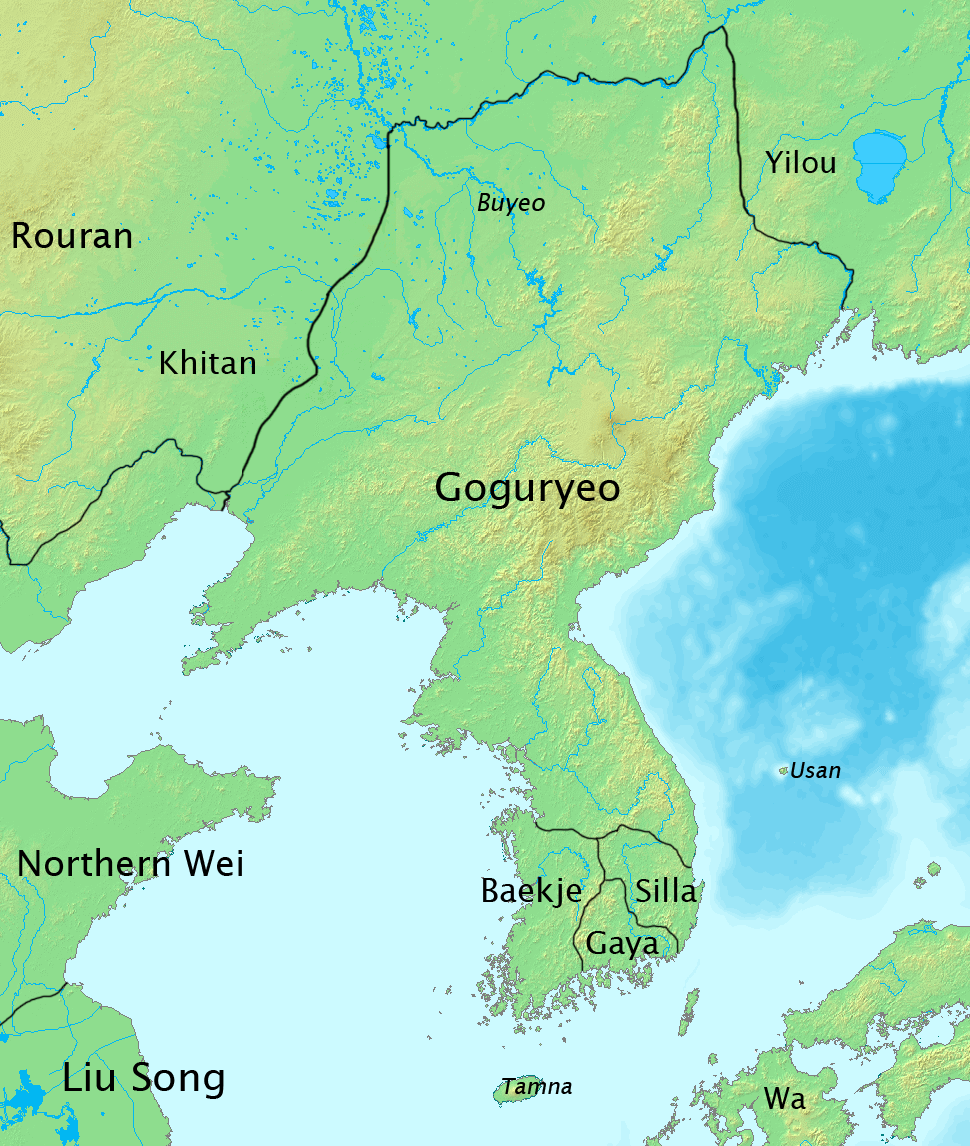
- The Korean peninsula in the late 5th century

Gaya (伽耶語, 가야어), also rendered Kaya, Kara or Karak, is the presumed language of the Gaya confederacy in ancient southern Korea. Only one word survives that is directly identified as being from the language of Gaya. Other evidence consists of place names, whose interpretation is uncertain.

== Name ==
The name Gaya is the modern Korean reading of a name originally written using Chinese characters. A variety of historical forms are attested. Generally it was transcribed as Kaya (加耶) or Karak (伽落), but the transcription in the oldest sources is Kara (加羅, Middle Chinese kæla). It is referred to as Kara and Mimana in the 8th-century Japanese history Nihon shoki.

Beckwith coined the term pre-Kara for a hypothetical Japonic language spoken in southern Korea at the time of the Yayoi migration to Kyushu (4th century BC).

== Byeonhan ==
The earliest accounts of the southern part of the Korean peninsula are found in Chinese histories. Chapter 30 "Description of the Eastern Barbarians" of the Records of the Three Kingdoms (late 3rd century) and Chapter 85 of the Book of the Later Han (5th century) contain parallel accounts of the Samhan ('three Han') – Mahan, Byeonhan and Jinhan – which were later replaced by Baekje, Gaya and Silla respectively. The Mahan were said to have a different language from Jinhan, but the two accounts differ on the relationship between the languages of Byeonhan and Jinhan, with the Records of the Three Kingdoms describing them as similar, but the Book of the Later Han referring to differences.

The Records of the Three Kingdoms lists 12 polities within Byeonhan, here given with pronunciations in Eastern Han Chinese:

- *mieliɑi-mietoŋ (彌離彌凍)
- *tsiapdɑ (接塗)
- *kɑtsi-mietoŋ (古資彌凍)
- *kɑtśuindźe (古淳是)
- *pɑnlɑ (半路)
- *lɑknɑ (樂奴)
- *mieʔɑ-jama (彌烏邪馬)
- *kɑmlɑ (甘路)
- *koja (狗邪)
- *tsodzouma (走漕馬)
- *ʔɑnja (安邪)
- *dokliɑ (瀆盧)

The three longer names appear to include suffixes. The suffix *-mietoŋ (which also occurs in one of the Jinhan names) has been compared with Late Middle Korean mith and Proto-Japonic *mətə, both meaning 'base, bottom' and claimed by Samuel Martin to be cognate. The suffix *-jama is commonly identified with Proto-Japonic *jama 'mountain'.

== Gaya confederacy ==
By the 4th century, Byeonhan had been replaced by the Gaya confederacy. Gaya traded extensively with the Chinese commanderies in northern Korea and with Japan, but was absorbed by Silla in the 6th century.

Much of our knowledge of Gaya comes from the Samguk sagi, a history of the Korean Three Kingdoms period, written in Classical Chinese and compiled in 1145 from records of the kingdoms of Silla, Goguryeo and Baekje that are no longer extant. Chapters 34, 35 and 36 survey the geography of the former kingdoms of Silla (including the former territory of Gaya), Goguryeo and Baekje respectively. They also cover the administrative re-organization after unification as Later Silla in 668, including former place names and the standardized two-character Sino-Korean names assigned under King Gyeongdeok in the 8th century. Some of the places named in Chapter 34 are in the area of the former Gaya confederacy, but attempts to interpret them are controversial.

The only word directly attributed to Gaya is found in an explanatory note in the same chapter, which reads:

旃檀梁，城門名。加羅語謂門爲梁云。
Sandalwood 梁: name of the fortress gate. In the Kaya language, 'gate' is called '梁'.

The Chinese character ⟨梁⟩ was used to write the Silla word for 'ridge', which was ancestral to Middle Korean twol 돌 'ridge', suggesting that the Gaya word for 'gate' may have been pronounced something like twol. This looks similar to Old Japanese to_{1} (modern Japanese to, 戸), meaning 'door, gate'.
