= Proto–Three Kingdoms period =

Proto-historical period in Korea

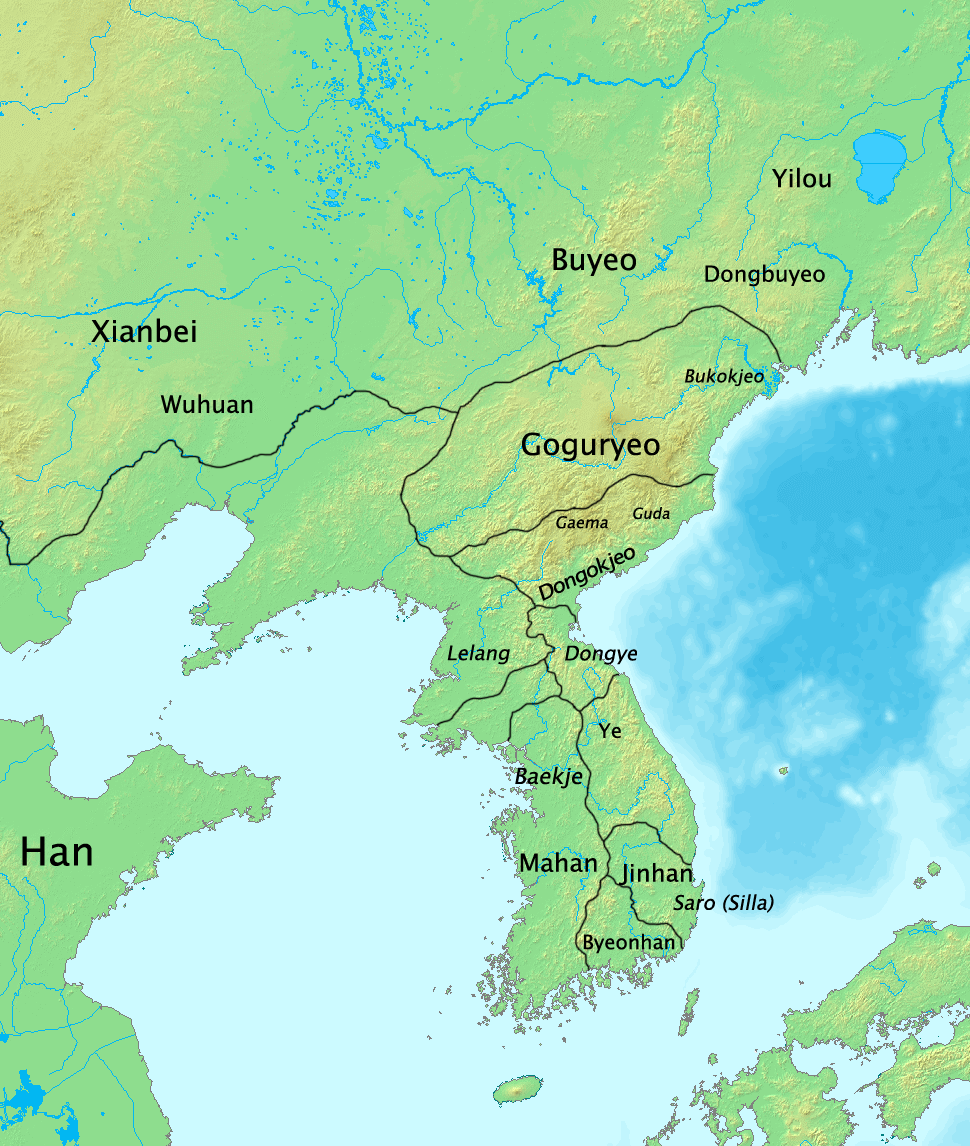
- From the top; Buyeo, Goguryeo, Okjeo, Dongye, Mahan, Jinhan, Byeonhan

Korean name
- Hangul: 원삼국 시대
- Hanja: 原三國時代
- RR: Wonsamguk sidae
- MR: Wŏnsamguk sidae

The Proto–Three Kingdoms period (Korean: 원삼국시대; Hanja: 原三國時代) refers to the proto-historical period in the Korean Peninsula after the fall of Old Chosŏn and before the maturation of Goguryeo, Paekche, and Silla into full-fledged kingdoms. It is a subdivision of what is traditionally called Korea's Three Kingdoms period and covers the first three centuries of the Common Era, corresponding to the later phase of the Korean Iron Age.

== History ==
With the Han conquest of Gojoseon in 108 BC, the northern region of the peninsula and Manchuria was occupied by the states of Buyeo, Goguryeo, Okjeo, the Eastern Ye, and other minor statelets. Goguryeo's traditional founding date is 37 BC, but it was mentioned in Chinese records as early as 75 BC. China installed four commanderies in the former Old Chosŏn territory, but three of them fell quickly to Korean resistance. Goguryeo gradually conquered and absorbed all its neighbors, and destroyed the last Chinese commandery in 313.

In the south, the little-understood state of Jin had given rise to the loose confederacies of Jinhan, Byeonhan, and Mahan, or collectively, the 'Samhan.' Baekje was founded in 18 BC in Mahan territory and began to slowly overtake it. Silla was founded by the unification of six chiefdoms within the Jinhan confederacy, traditionally dated to 57 BC, although it may have been somewhat later. The Byeonhan confederacy was absorbed into the later Kaya confederacy, which in turn was annexed by the kingdom of Silla.

Because of this continuity, most historians consider the Three Kingdoms to begin around the fall of Old Chosŏn, but the three did not dominate the peninsula as kingdoms until around 300.

== Iron culture ==
Important features of this period include the widespread production of iron artifacts for daily use and the introduction of grey earthenware pottery with a beaten pattern.

Archaeological finds of the period are mainly from Nangnang and Goguryeo in the north and Samhan in the south. Bronze and iron were used and iron made at shell midden sites on the southern coast.

Artifacts typical of the Korean Bronze Dagger culture, some Han Chinese culture, and Northern Steppe cultures have been found together on archaeological sites in the northern region, indicating independent and extensive interactions by the Koreanic kingdoms and statelets with China and various other areas.

The introduction of iron technology enabled the manufacture and use of stronger and sharper weapons and agricultural tools, resulting in an acceleration of political integration, as well as greater concentrations of power and wealth.

== Trade ==
Trade is documented in the "Annals of the Three Kingdoms" of Records of the Three Kingdoms, which states that iron from the Nakdong River basin was exported to Lelang Commandery and Wakoku (Wa) of Japan. Contact with the cultures of the lower basin of the Nakdong River is demonstrated by archaeological evidence from China, Wa, and Manchuria.

In the southern part of the Korean Peninsula, Chinese bronze mirrors, three-legged bronze ritual vessels, bronze buckles, and Chinese coins have been found both from shell middens and tombs. Examples of artifacts originating from the Northern Province include bronze 'Fu' vessels, tiger-shaped buckles, and horse-shaped buckles. Objects from Wa include Yayoi pottery, jar coffins, wide bronze spearheads and bronze halberds.

== See also ==
- History of Korea
- Four Commanderies of Han
- National Treasure of South Korea
- Three Kingdoms of Korea
