= Byeonhan confederacy =

1st to 4th century Koreanic state

Byeonhan confederacy 弁韓 변한
- 2nd century BCE–42 CE
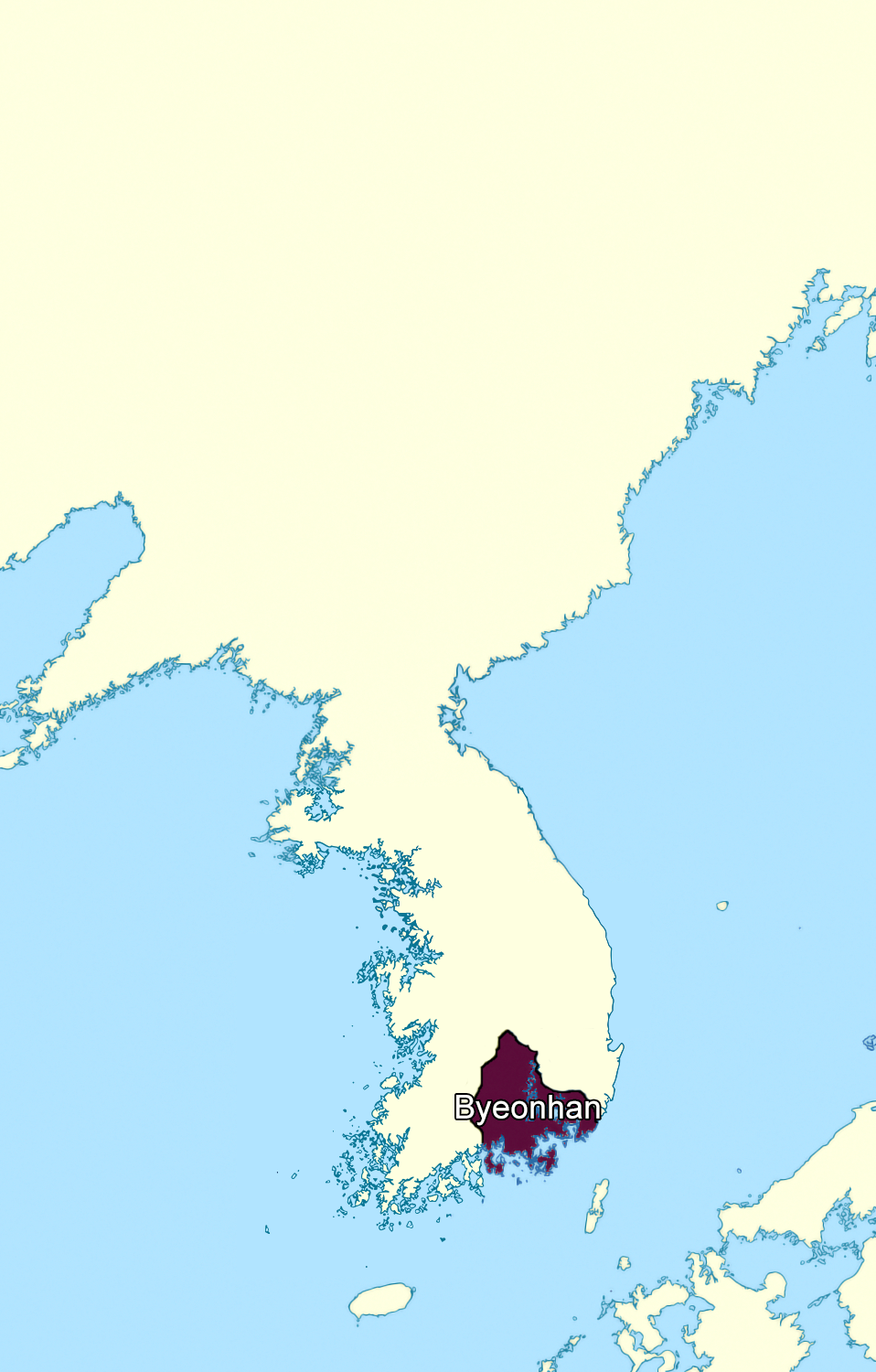
- Byeonhan confederacy in c. 1 CE
- Common languages: Han, possibly Peninsular Japonic
- Ethnic groups: Samhan people, Yemaek, possibly Yayoi people
- Religion: Musok, possibly Koshinto
- Government: Confederacy
- Historical era: Ancient
  - Establishment: 2nd century BCE
  - Transition to the Gaya confederacy.: 42 CE
Preceded by	Succeeded by
Jin (Korean state)	Gaya confederacy
- Today part of: South Korea

Korean name
- Hangul: 변한
- Hanja: 弁韓
- RR: Byeonhan
- MR: Pyŏnhan
- IPA: [pjʌn.ɦan]

Alternate name
- Hangul: 변진
- Hanja: 弁辰
- RR: Byeonjin
- MR: Pyŏnjin
- IPA: [pjʌn.dʑin]

Byeonhan (Korean: 변한; Hanja: 弁韓), also known as Byeonjin (변진; 弁辰), was a loose confederacy of chiefdoms that existed from around the beginning of the Common Era to the 4th century in the southern Korean Peninsula. Byeonhan was one of the Samhan (or "Three Hans"), along with Mahan and Jinhan.

== Etymology ==
Byeonhan (弁韓) is believed to be a combination of Old Korean words. Byeon (변) in native Korean meant "Shiny/Shimmering" while han (한) meant "big", giving the meaning of Byeonhan, the "Big Nation of Shimmering".

As part of the Samhan, Jinhan meant "Big Nation of the East" and Mahan meant "Big Nation of the South".

== History ==
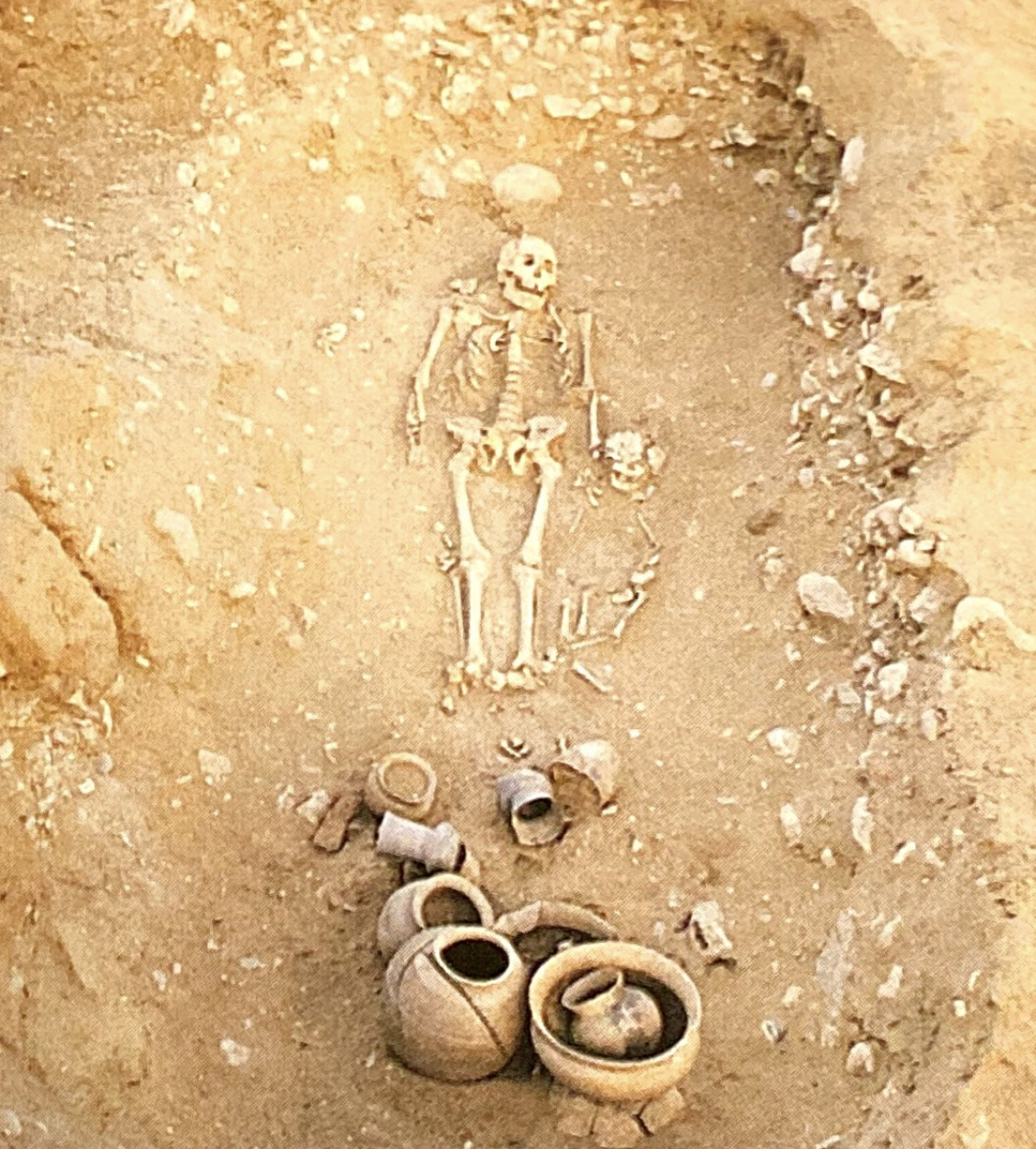
Skeletal remains from the Byeonhan confederacy period that was discovered in Gimhae, South Korea through archaeology. Burial traditions can be seen.

This early part of the Three Kingdoms period is sometimes called the Proto–Three Kingdoms period. Byeonhan, like the other Samhan confederacies, appears to be descended from the Jin state of southern Korea.

Archaeological evidence indicates an increase in military activity and weapons production among the Byeonhan in the 3rd century, especially an increase in iron arrowheads and cuirasses (Barnes 2000). This may be associated with the decline of Byeonhan and the rise of the more centralized Gaya confederacy, which most Byeonhan states joined. Gaya was subsequently annexed by Silla, one of the Three Kingdoms of Korea.

Various cultural aspects supposedly unique to Byeonhan overlap with Jinhan, but are not universal in Byeonhan. One notable tradition was tattooing, which was done by both men and women. Another tradition was the burying of feathers and pottery in graves alongside the dead body as it was believed that the feathers helped the afterlife souls fly into the sky.

Byeonhan as a political grouping was also sometimes referred to by a calque of Byeon (弁) and Jin (辰) as Byeonjin with the ethnonym Han (韓) being used by its inhabitants, identical to that of its neighbours.

There are also two hypotheses about the Byeonhan constituting a separate ethnicity distinct from the Jinhan:

1. The Wa people of the Japanese archipelago, described in early Chinese records as present on the southern coasts of the peninsula.
2. Any ethnic who traveled through ancient southern trade routes seen through the distribution of dolmens culture. According to recent studies that excavated Kofuns in South Jeolla Province, analysis of the components of glass beads there suggests that the raw material production area is Thailand.

However, there is no distinct evidence that indicates an ethnic separation of Byeonhan and Jinhan as the two shared essentially the same culture, with varying religious customs, and apparently were not separated by a clear boundary according to the contemporary Chinese chronicle, Records of the Three Kingdoms.

== Culture and language ==
The Dongyi ("Eastern Barbarian") in the Book of Wei section of the Chinese book, Records of the Three Kingdoms states that the culture of Byeonhan was similar to that of Jinhan (言語法俗相似) and that their populations lived "intermingled together" (弁辰與辰韓雑居), while having similar language and customs.

The fifth century Book of the Later Han, however, notes on differences in their language and customs as "languages and customs have differences" (言語風俗有異), after stating that their enclosed settlements and clothing are the same.

Furthermore, the Wei shu states that "Jinhan men and women are close to Wa (男女近倭)", the ethnonym for the contemporary inhabitants of the Japanese archipelago, and like the Wa tattoo their bodies. The Book of the Later Han however identifies this with Byeonhan, stating that "their country is close to Wa, therefore they frequently have tattoos."

The linguist John Whitman summarizes the situation as such:

In fact, the texts indicate a more complex (and plausible) interrelationship between language, ethnicity, and protopolitical grouping. [...] The Jinhan population lives intermixed with Pyŏnhan; the Chinese reporters struggle to describe the resultant demographic complexity. Their languages may be similar, or different; some resemble the Wa, some tattoo their bodies. While Wa-like toponyms are more frequent in the Pyŏnhan grouping, one such toponym is identified with Jinhan. This is exactly the kind of complexity we might expect to be associated with the situation described by Ahn, where a population associated with Mumun wet rice growing culture lives alongside more recently arrived members of the Korean-style bronze dagger culture.

== Politics and trade ==
Byeonhan may have simply been a political description for decentralized polities south and west of the Nakdong river valley that were not formal members of the Jinhan confederacy.

Byeonhan was internationally known for its production of iron, which was also its main export good to the Lelang commandery to the northwest, the Japanese archipelago, and the rest of the Korean Peninsula. It was also a center of stoneware manufacture.

== Member statelets ==
According to the Records of Three Kingdoms, Byeonhan consisted of 12 statelets:

- Mirimidong (미리미동국; 彌離彌凍國), present-day Miryang.
- Jeopdo (접도국; 接塗國), present-day Haman.
- Gojamidong (고자미동국; 古資彌凍國), present-day Goseong.
- Gosunsi (고순시국; 古淳是國), present-day Jinju, Sacheon or Goseong.
- Ballo (반로국; 半路國), present-day Seongju.
- Nangno (낙노국; 樂奴國), present-day Hadong or Namhae.
- Gunmi (군미국; 軍彌國), present-day Sacheon.
- Mioyama (미오야마국; 彌烏邪馬國), present-day Changwon.
- Gamno (감로국; 甘路國), present-day Gimcheon.
- Guya (구야국; 狗邪國), present-day Gimhae.
- Jujoma (주조마국; 走漕馬國), present-day Gimcheon.
- Anya (안야국; 安邪國), present-day Haman.
- Dongno (독로국; 瀆盧國), present-day Dongnae.
