= Kim Bang-han =

South Korean linguist (1925–2001)

Kim Bang-han (Korean: 김방한; August 17, 1925 – October 18, 2001) was a South Korean linguist. He proposed primitive Korean peninsula language theory. Primitive Korean peninsula language is a now-extinct non-Koreanic languages that some linguists believe were formerly spoken in central and southern parts of the Korean Peninsula.
