= Three Kingdoms of Korea =

Pre-unification kingdoms (57 BC–668 AD)

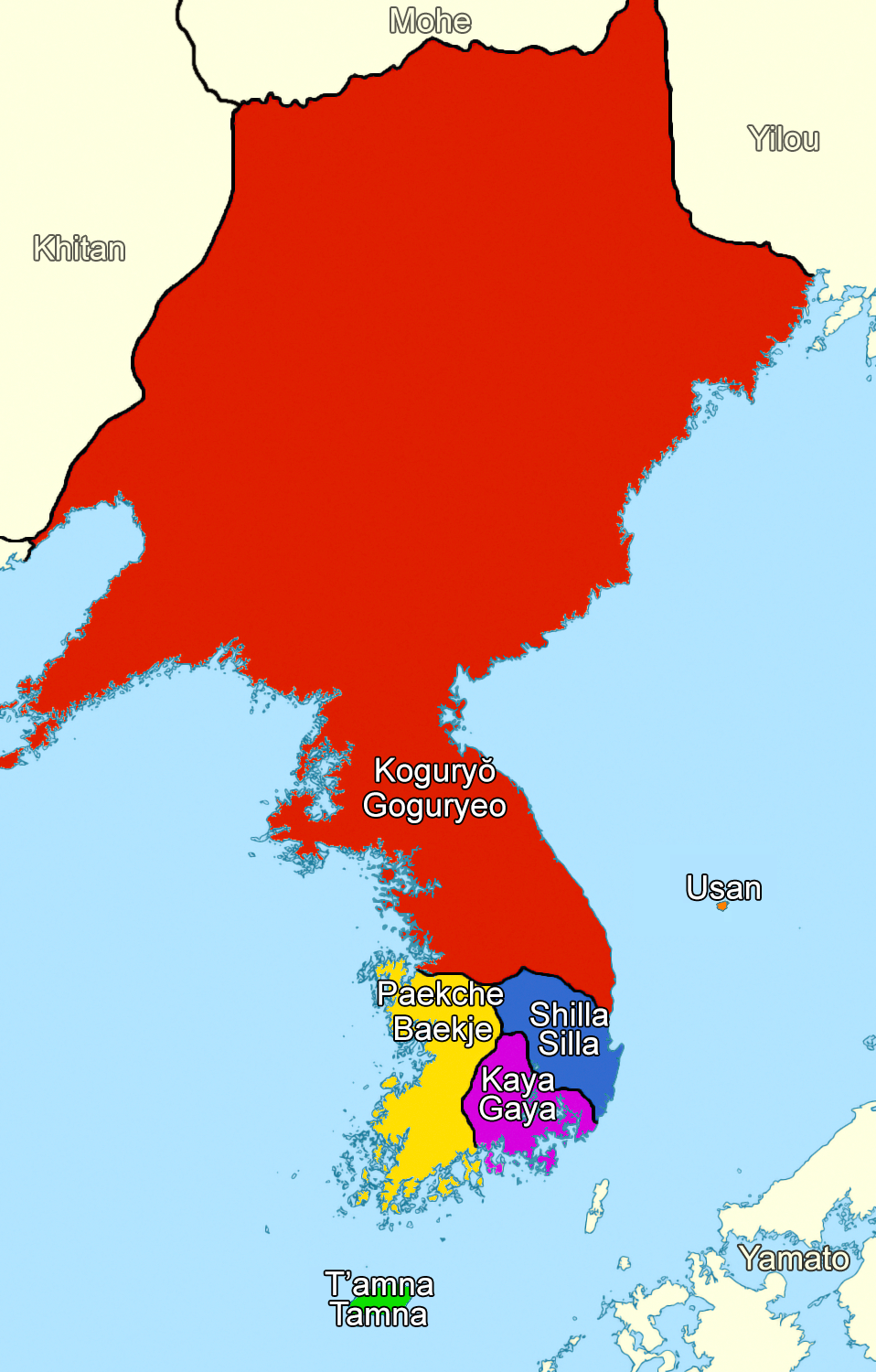
- Map of the Three Kingdoms of Korea—Goguryeo, Paekche, and Silla—in the 5th century, at the height of Goguryeo's territorial expansion (Kaya, Tamna, and Usan are often not included in the Three Kingdoms)

Korean name
- Hangul: 삼국 시대
- Hanja: 三國時代
- RR: Samguk sidae
- MR: Samguk sidae

Alternate name
- Hangul: 삼국 시기
- Hanja: 三國時期
- RR: Samguk sigi
- MR: Samguk sigi

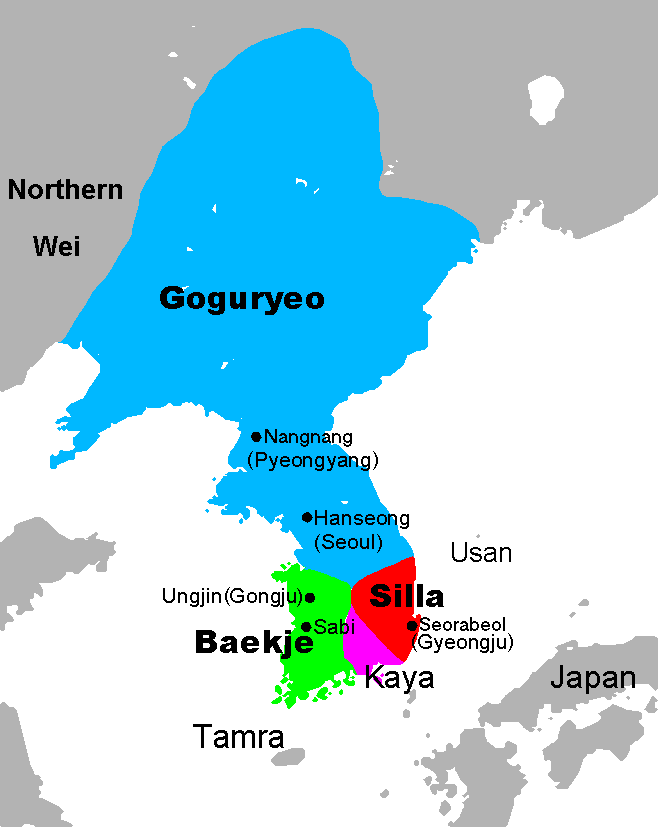
The Three Kingdoms of Korea, at the end of the 5th century

The Three Kingdoms of Korea (Korean: 삼국시대; Hanja: 三國時代) or Samhan of Korea, refers to the period in Korean history when the peninsula was divided into three major kingdoms: Goguryeo, Paekche, and Silla (also known as the "Samhan" kingdoms) following the Proto–Three Kingdoms period.

These Samhan kingdoms competed for hegemony over the Korean Peninsula during the ancient period of Korean history. During the period, (Note: Preceded by the Proto-Three Kingdoms period, the Three Kingdoms period is traditionally dated from 57 BC to 668 AD.) many states and statelets consolidated until, after Buyeo was annexed in 494 and Kaya was annexed in 562, only three remained on the Korean Peninsula: Goguryeo, Paekche and Silla. The "Korean Three Kingdoms" contributed to what would become Korea, and the Goguryeo, Paekche and Silla peoples became the Korean people.

The three kingdoms occupied the entire peninsula and roughly half of Manchuria (modern-day Northeast China and small parts of the Russian Far East). Goguryeo controlled the northern half of the peninsula, as well as Liaodong Peninsula and Manchuria. Paekche and Silla occupied the southern half of the peninsula. The island kingdoms of Tamna and Usan were subordinated to Paekche and Silla, respectively.

All three kingdoms shared a similar culture and language. Paekche and Goguryeo shared founding myths which likely originated in Buyeo. Buddhism, which arrived in Korea in the 3rd century CE from India via Tibet and China, became the state religion of all constituents of the three kingdoms, starting with Goguryeo in 372 CE. The Three Kingdoms of Korea all had a warrior aristocracy in contrast to the literary elite of China.

The period ended in the 7th century, after Silla allied with Tang China and unified the peninsula for the first time in history. After the fall of Paekche and Goguryeo, the Tang dynasty established a short-lived military government to administer parts of the Korean Peninsula. Silla was joined by Goguryeo and Paekche loyalists and fought the Tang for hegemony over the Korean Peninsula. Silla was eventually divided into the Later Three Kingdoms and ultimately annexed by the new Goguryeo revivalist state of Goryeo.

== Nomenclature ==
Beginning in the 7th century, the name "Samhan" became synonymous with the Three Kingdoms of Korea. The "Han" in the names of the Korean Empire, Daehan Jeguk, and the Republic of Korea (South Korea), Daehan Minguk or Hanguk, are named in reference to the Three Kingdoms of Korea, not the ancient confederacies in the southern Korean Peninsula.

According to the Samguk sagi and Samguk yusa, Silla implemented a national policy, "Samhan Unification" (삼한일통; 三韓一統; Samhan ilt'ong), to integrate Paekche and Goguryeo refugees. In 1982, a memorial stone dating to 686 was discovered in Cheongju with an inscription: "The Three Han were unified and the domain was expanded." During the Later Silla period, the concepts of Samhan as the ancient confederacies and the Three Kingdoms of Korea were merged. In a letter to an imperial tutor of the Tang dynasty, Ch'oe Ch'i-wŏn equated Byeonhan to Paekche, Jinhan to Silla, and Mahan to Goguryeo. By the Goryeo period, Samhan became a common name to refer to all of Korea. In his Ten Mandates to his descendants, Wang Geon declared that he had unified the Three Han (Samhan), referring to the Three Kingdoms of Korea. Samhan continued to be a common name for Korea during the Joseon period and was widely referenced in the Annals of the Joseon Dynasty.

In China, the Three Kingdoms of Korea were collectively called Samhan since the beginning of the 7th century. The use of the name Samhan to indicate the Three Kingdoms of Korea was widespread in the Tang dynasty. Goguryeo was alternately called Mahan by the Tang dynasty, as evidenced by a Tang document that called Goguryeo generals "Mahan leaders" (마한추장; 馬韓酋長; Mahan ch'ujang) in 645. In 651, Emperor Gaozong of Tang sent a message to the king of Paekche referring to the Three Kingdoms of Korea as Samhan. Epitaphs of the Tang dynasty, including those belonging to Paekche, Goguryeo, and Silla refugees and migrants, called the Three Kingdoms of Korea "Samhan", especially Goguryeo. For example, the epitaph of Go Hyeon (고현; 高玄), a Tang dynasty general of Goguryeo origin who died in 690, calls him a "Liaodong Samhan man" (요동 삼한인; 遼東三韓人; Yodong Samhanin).

The name "Three Kingdoms" was used in the titles of the Korean histories Samguk sagi (12th century) and Samguk yusa (13th century), and should not be confused with the Three Kingdoms of China.

== Foundation ==
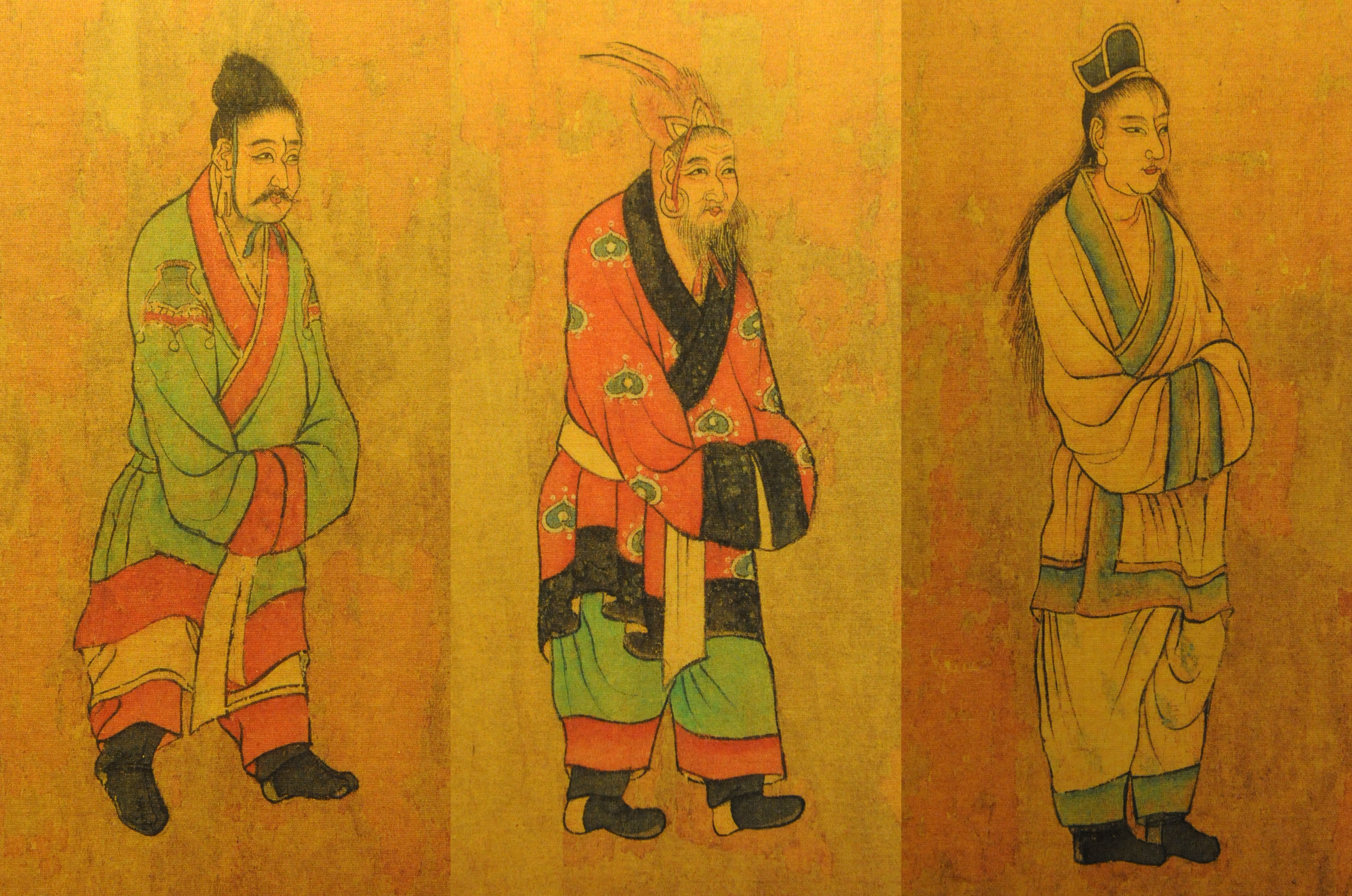
7th century Tang dynasty painting of envoys from the Three Kingdoms of Korea: Paekche, Goguryeo, and Silla.

The Three Kingdoms were founded after the fall of Wiman Joseon and gradually conquered and absorbed various other small states and confederacies. After the fall of Gojoseon, the Han dynasty established four commanderies in the northwestern Korean Peninsula and present Liaoning. Three fell quickly to the Samhan, and the last was destroyed by Goguryeo in 313.

The nascent precursors of Paekche and Silla expanded within the web of statelets during the Proto-Three Kingdoms period, and Goguryeo conquered neighboring state like Buyeo in Manchuria and chiefdoms in Okjeo, Dongye which occupied the northeastern Korean Peninsula. The three polities made the transition from walled-town state to full-fledged state-level societies between 1st – 3rd century CE.

The primary sources for this period include Samguk sagi and Samguk yusa in Korea, and the "Eastern Barbarians" section (東夷傳) from the Book of Wei (魏書) of the Records of the Three Kingdoms in China.

All three kingdoms shared a similar culture and language. The Book of Sui (Volume 81) recorded: "The customs, laws and clothes of Goguryeo, Paekche and Silla are generally identical." Their original religions appear to have been shamanistic, but they were increasingly influenced by Chinese culture, particularly Confucianism and Taoism. In the 4th century, Buddhism was introduced to the peninsula and spread rapidly, briefly becoming the official religion of all three kingdoms.

According to Lisa Kay Bailey, the material culture of the Three Kingdoms can be clearly distinguished as they displayed cultural influence from different regions. Goguryeo's culture showed stronger influence from northern Chinese art, Baekche showed stronger influence from southern Chinese art, and Silla, which was more distant from China, showed greater influence from Eurasian steppe nomad cultures and greater preservation of native traditions. During this period, the Three Kingdoms had yet to unify their separate identities. Each kingdom produced their own individual histories; only in the Goryeo dynasty period was the collective history of the Korean Peninsula written together.

"The decline of Chinese power in the fourth century unleashed a wave of refugees that proved pivotal in speeding up the process of state-building in Korea," starting the Three Kingdoms era.

== Kingdoms ==
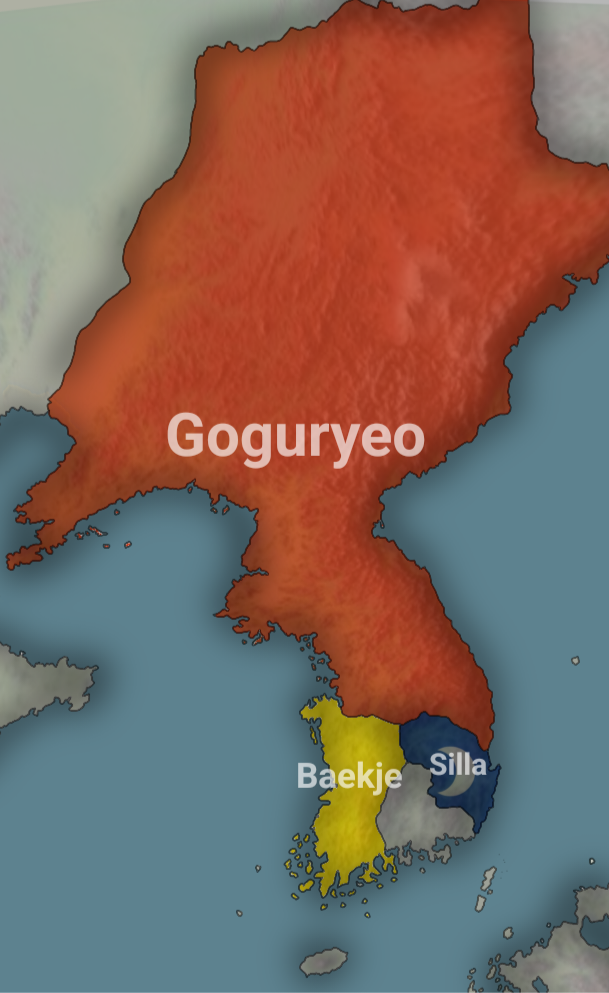
The Map of the Three Kingdoms of Korea

=== Goguryeo ===
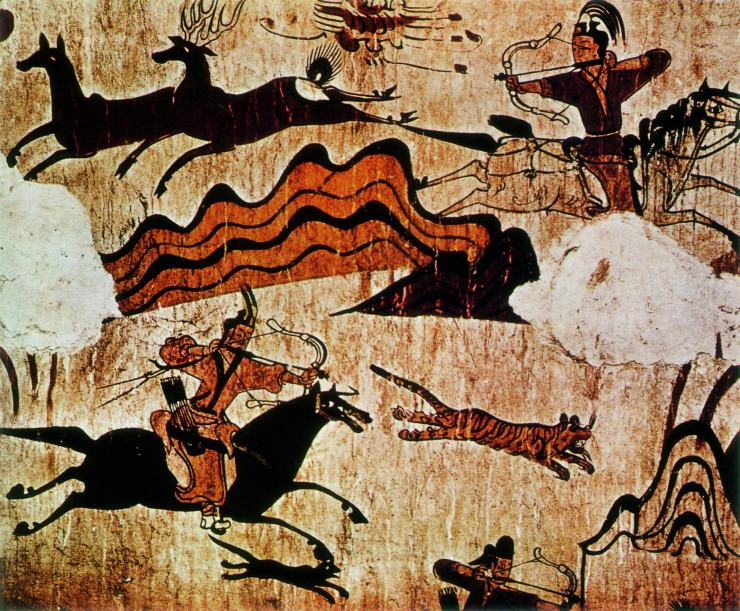
Goguryeo tomb mural.

Goguryeo emerged on the north and south banks of the Yalu (Amrok) River, in the wake of Gojoseon's fall. The first mention of Goguryeo in Chinese records dates from 75 BCE in reference to a commandery established by the Chinese Han dynasty, although even earlier mentions of "Guri" (구리) may be of the same state. Evidence indicates Goguryeo was the most advanced, and likely the first established, of the three kingdoms.

Goguryeo, eventually the largest of the three kingdoms, had several capitals in alternation: two capitals in the upper Yalu area, and later Nangrang (Lelang in Chinese) which is now part of Pyongyang. At the beginning, the state was located on the border with China; it gradually expanded into Manchuria and destroyed the Chinese Lelang commandery in 313. The cultural influence of the Chinese continued as Buddhism was adopted as the official religion in 372.

Goguryeo was a highly militaristic state; it was a powerful empire and one of the great powers in East Asia. The state was at its zenith in the 5th century, during the rule of King Gwanggaeto the Great and his son King Jangsu, and particularly during their campaign in Manchuria. For the next century or so, Goguryeo was the dominant nation in Manchuria and the northern Korean peninsula. Goguryeo eventually occupied the Liaodong Plains in Manchuria and today's Seoul area. Gwanggaeto achieved a loose unification of the Three Kingdoms of Korea.

Goguryeo also controlled Tungusic tribes in Manchuria. After the establishment of the Sui dynasty and later the Tang dynasty in China, the kingdom continued to take aggressive actions against China, Silla, and Paekche attacks until it was conquered by allied Silla–Tang forces in 668. Most of its territory was absorbed by the Tang dynasty of China, and the territory of Paekche was absorbed by Silla.

=== Paekche ===
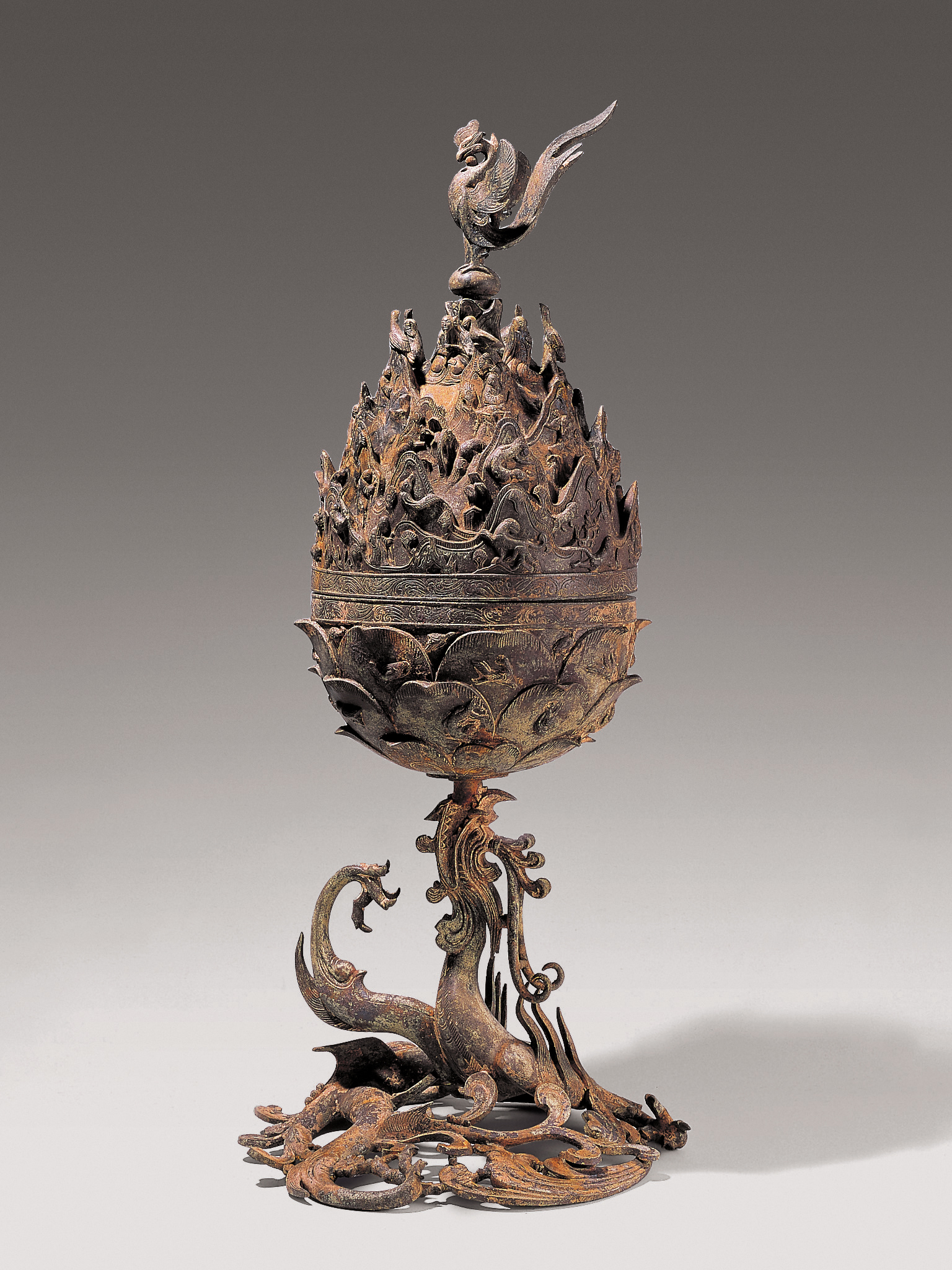
Gilt-bronze Incense Burner of Paekche

Paekche was founded as a member of the Mahan confederacy. Two sons of the founder of Goguryeo are recorded to have fled a succession conflict, to establish Paekche around the present Seoul area. Paekche absorbed or conquered other Mahan chiefdoms and, at its peak in the 4th century, controlled most of the western Korean Peninsula. Buddhism was introduced to Paekche in 384 from Goguryeo, which Paekche welcomed.

Paekche was a great maritime power; its nautical skill, which made it the Phoenicia of East Asia, was instrumental in the dissemination of Buddhism throughout East Asia and continental culture to Japan. Paekche played a fundamental role in transmitting cultural and material developments to ancient Japan, including Chinese written characters, Chinese and Korean literature, technologies such as ferrous metallurgy and ceramics, architectural styles, sericulture and Buddhism.

Paekche exerted its political influence on Tamna, a kingdom that ruled Jeju Island. Paekche maintained a close relationship with and extracted tribute from Tamna. Paekche's religious and artistic culture influenced Goguryeo and Silla. Paekche was once a great military power on the Korean Peninsula, especially during the time of Geunchogo, but was critically defeated by Gwanggaeto and declined.

In the late 5th century, under attack from Goguryeo, the capital of Paekche was moved south to Ungjin (present-day Gongju) and later further south to Sabi (present-day Buyeo). Paekche was conquered by Silla-Tang alliance in 660, submitting the Unified Silla.

=== Silla ===
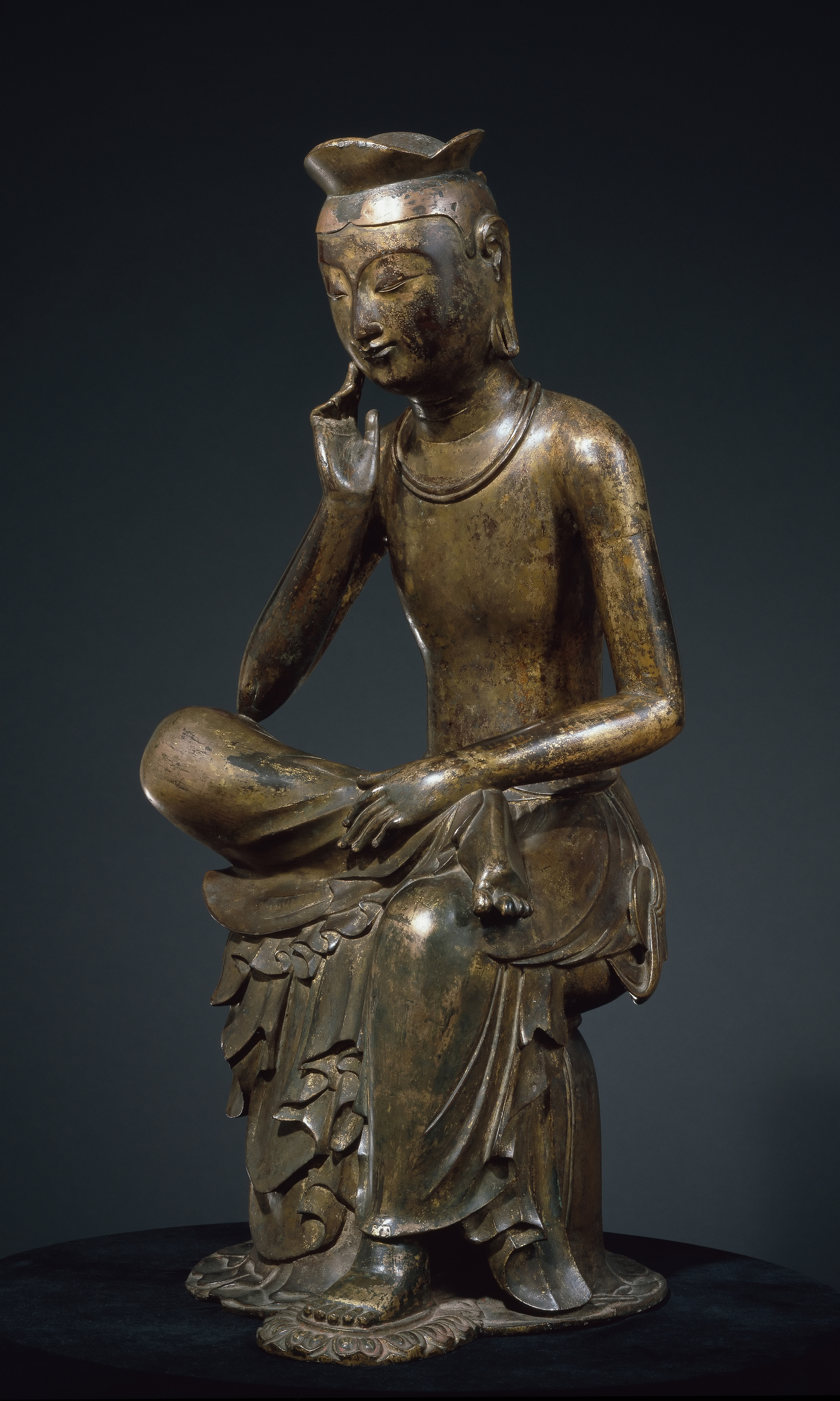
Bangasayusang, 7th century

According to Korean records, in 57 BCE, Seorabeol (or Saro, later Silla) in the southeast of the peninsula unified and expanded the confederation of city-states known as Jinhan. Although Samguk sagi records that Silla was the earliest-founded of the three kingdoms, other written and archaeological records indicate that Silla was likely the last of the three to establish a centralized government. Silla was the smallest and weakest of the Three Kingdoms of Korea, but it used cunning diplomatic means to make opportunistic pacts and alliances with the more powerful Korean kingdoms, and eventually Tang China, to its great advantage.

Renamed from Saro to Silla in 503, the kingdom annexed the Kaya confederacy (which in turn had absorbed Byeonhan earlier) in the first half of the 6th century. Goguryeo and Paekche responded by forming an alliance. To cope with invasions from Goguryeo and Paekche, Silla deepened its relations with the Tang dynasty, with its newly gained access to the Yellow Sea making direct contact with the Tang possible. After the conquest of Goguryeo and Paekche with her Tang allies, the Silla kingdom drove the Tang forces out of the peninsula and occupied the lands south of Pyongyang.

The capital of Silla was Seorabeol (now Gyeongju; "Seorabeol", "서라벌", is hypothesized to have been the ancient Korean term for "capital"). Buddhism became the official religion in 528. The remaining material culture from the kingdom of Silla including unique gold metalwork shows influence from the northern nomadic steppes, differentiating it from the cultures of Goguryeo and Paekche where Chinese influence was more pronounced.

=== Other states ===
Other smaller states or regions existed in Korea before and during this period:

- The Kaya confederacy was a confederacy of small kingdoms in the Nakdong River valley of southern Korea since 42 CE, growing out of the Byeonhan confederacy of the Samhan period. Archaeologists interpret mounded burial cemeteries of the late 3rd and early 4th centuries such as Daeseong-dong in Gimhae and Bokcheon-dong in Busan as the royal burial grounds of Kaya polities. Kaya polities had economies that were based on agriculture, fishing, casting, and long-distance trade. Kaya polities exported abundant quantities of iron ore, iron armor, and other weaponry to Paekche and the Kingdom of Wa. Constantly engaged in war with the three kingdoms surrounding it, Kaya was not developed to form a unified state and was ultimately absorbed into Silla in 562.
- Dongye, Okjeo, and Buyeo were all conquered by Goguryeo
- Usan (Ulleung-do) tributary of Silla
- Tamna (Jeju Province) tributary of Paekche

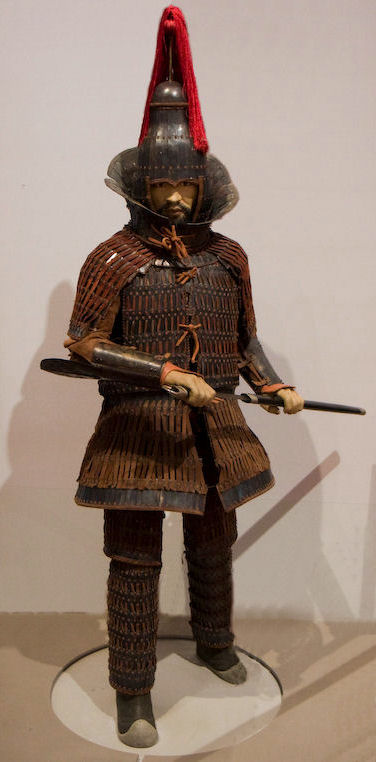
A Kaya soldier.

== Religion ==
Centuries after Buddhism originated in India, the Mahayana Buddhism arrived in China through the Silk Route in 1st century CE from Tibet, then to Korean Peninsula in the 3rd century from where it transmitted to Japan. In Korea, it was adopted by the state religion by three constituent polities, first by the Goguryeo ruling tribe of Geumgwan Kaya in 372 CE, by the Silla in 528 CE, and by the Paekche in 552 CE.

== Decline ==
Allied with China under the Tang dynasty, Silla conquered Goguryeo in 668, after having already conquered Kaya in 562 and Paekche in 660, thus ushering in the North–South states period with Later Silla to the south and Parhae to the north, when Dae Jo-young, a former Goguryeo military officer, revolted against Tang Chinese rule and began reconquering former Goguryeo territories.

== Archaeological evidence ==
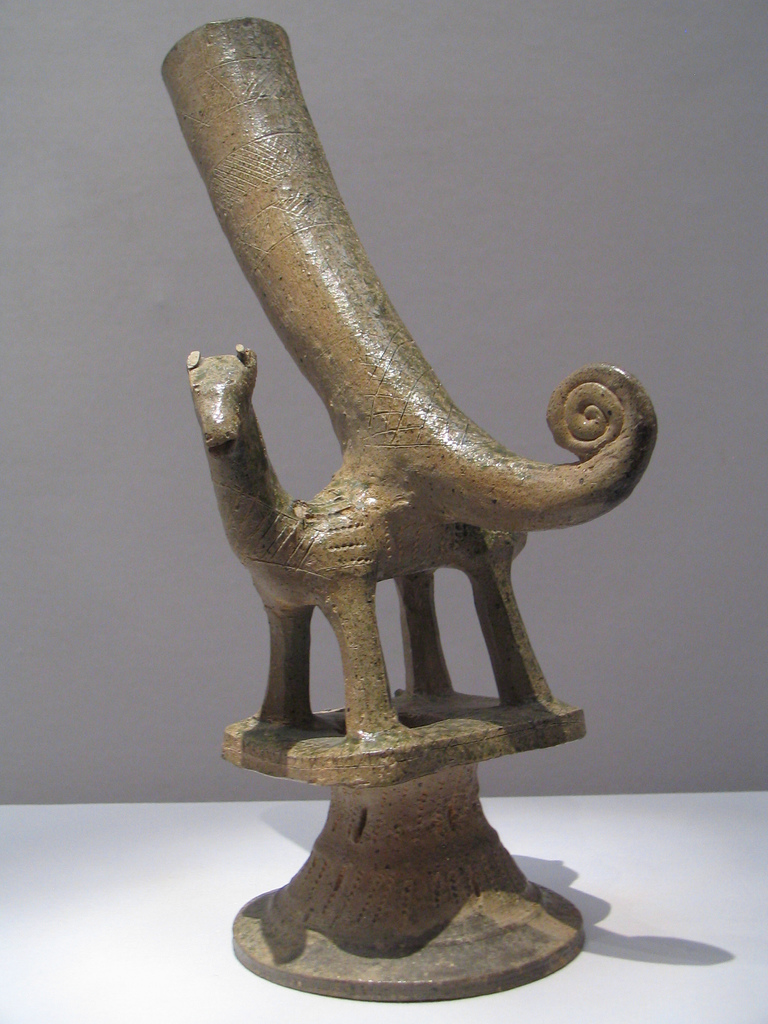
An unusual drinking vessel excavated from a Kaya mounded burial.

Archaeologists use theoretical guidelines derived from anthropology, ethnology, analogy, and ethnohistory to the concept of what defines a state-level society. This is different from the concept of state (guk or Sino ko: 國, walled-town state, etc.) in the discipline of Korean history.

In anthropological archaeology the presence of urban centres (especially capitals), monumental architecture, craft specialization and standardization of production, ostentatious burials, writing or recording systems, bureaucracy, demonstrated political control of geographical areas that are usually larger in area than a single river valley, etc. make up some of these correlates that define states.

Among the archaeology sites dating to the Three Kingdoms of Korea, hundreds of cemeteries with thousands of burials have been excavated. The vast majority of archaeological evidence of the Three Kingdoms period of Korea consists of burials, but since the 1990s there has been a great increase in the archaeological excavations of ancient industrial production sites, roads, palace grounds and elite precincts, ceremonial sites, commoner households, and fortresses due to the boom in salvage archaeology in South Korea.

Rhee and Choi hypothesize that a mix of internal developments and external factors lead to the emergence of state-level societies in Korea. A number of archaeologists including Kang demonstrate the role of frequent warfare in the development of peninsular states.

=== Foundation (c. 1 – 300/400 CE) ===
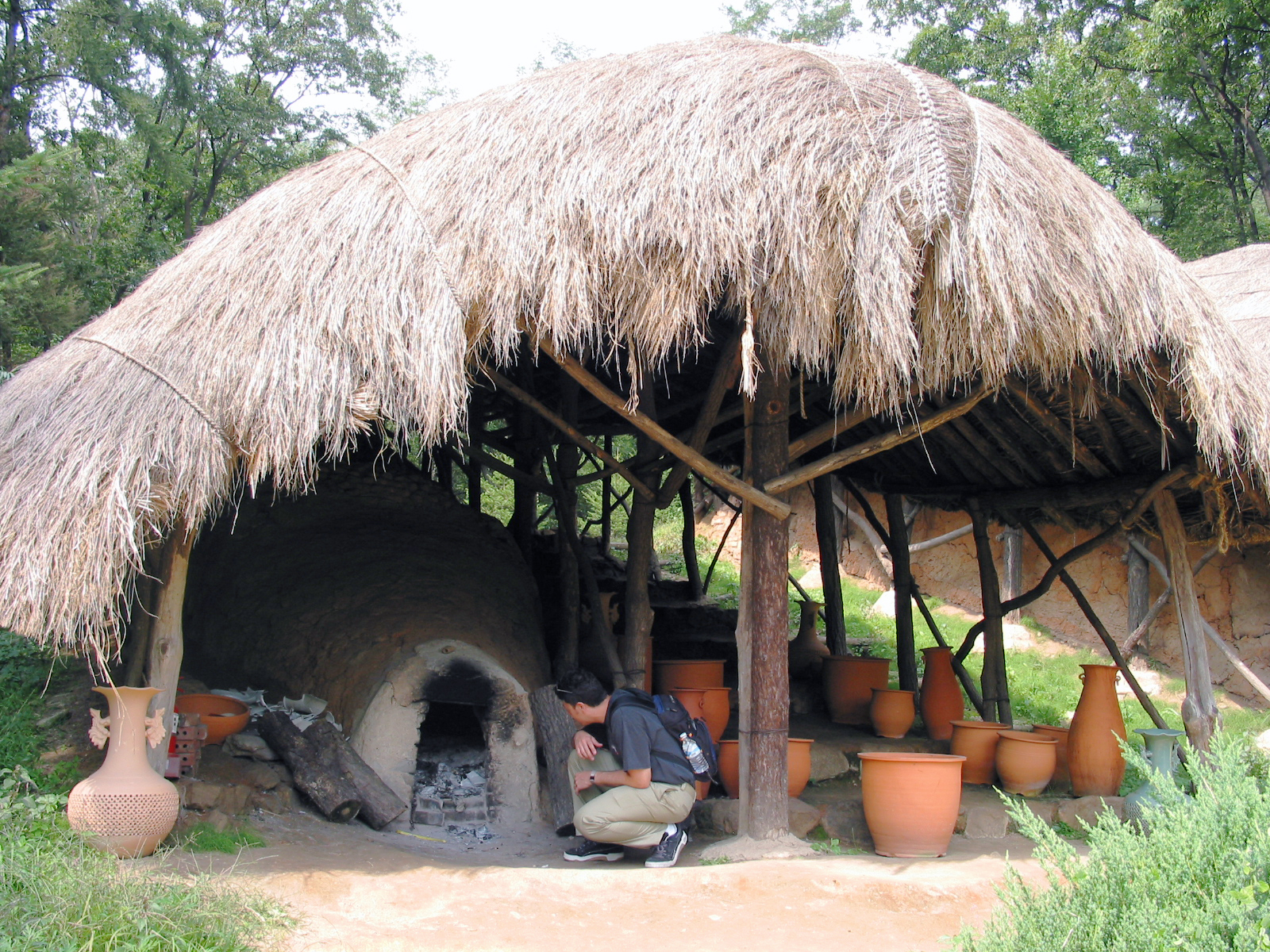
Historic example of a climbing kiln similar to those that were excavated from Songok-dong and Mulcheon-ri as early as the late Three Kingdoms period, c. 600.

Some individual correlates of complex societies are found in the chiefdoms of Korea that date back to c. 700 BC. The best evidence from the archaeological record indicates that states formed between 300 BCE and 300/400 CE. However, archaeologists are not prepared to suggest that this means there were states in the BCE era. The correlates of state-level societies did not develop as a package but rather in spurts and starts and at various points in time. It was some time between 100 and 400 CE that individual correlates of state societies had developed to a sufficient number and scale that state-level societies can be confidently identified using archaeological data.

=== Burials ===
Lee Sung-Joo analyzed variability in many of the elite cemeteries of the territories of Silla and Kaya polities and found that as late as the 2nd century there was intra-cemetery variation in the distribution of prestige grave goods, but there was an absence of hierarchical differences on a regional scale between cemeteries. Near the end of the 2nd century CE, interior space in elite burials increased in size, and wooden chamber burial construction techniques were increasingly used by elites.

In the 3rd century, a pattern developed in which single elite cemeteries that were the highest in status compared to all the other cemeteries were built. Such cemeteries were established at high elevations along ridgelines and on hilltops. Furthermore, the uppermost elite were buried in large-scale tombs established at the highest point of a given cemetery. Cemeteries with 'uppermost elite' mounded burials such as Okseong-ri, Yangdong-ri, Daeseong-dong, and Bokcheon-dong display this pattern.

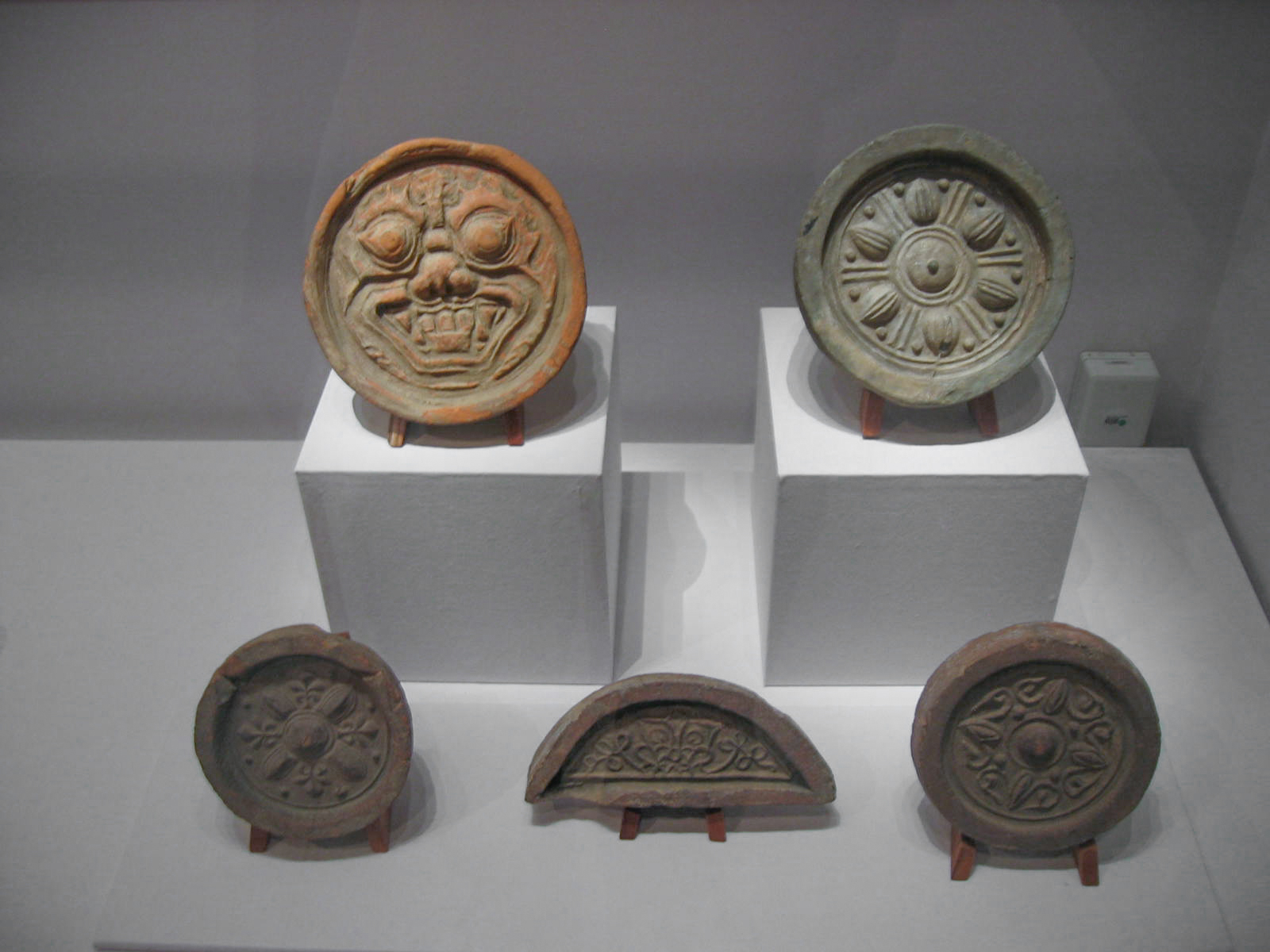
Roof tiles excavated from Goguryeo archaeological sites in the Han River valley, from National Museum of Korea.

=== Factory-scale production of pottery and roof-tiles ===
Lee Sung-Joo proposed that, in addition to the development of regional political hierarchies as seen through analysis of burials, variation in types of pottery production gradually disappeared and full-time specialization was the only recognizable kind of pottery production from the end of the 4th century A.D. At the same time the production centers for pottery became highly centralized and vessels became standardized.

Centralisation and elite control of production is demonstrated by the results of the archaeological excavations at Songok-dong and Mulcheon-ni in Gyeongju. These sites are part of what was an interconnected and sprawling ancient industrial complex on the northeast outskirts of the Silla capital. Songok-dong and Mulcheon-ri are examples of the large-scale of specialized factory-style productions in the Three Kingdoms and Unified Silla periods. The site was excavated in the late 1990s, and archaeologists found the remains of many production features such as pottery kilns, roof-tile kilns, charcoal kilns, as well as the remains of buildings and workshops associated with production.

=== Capital cities, elite precincts, and monumental architecture ===
Since the establishment of Goguryeo, its early history is well attested archaeologically: the first and second capital cities, Jolbon and Gungnae city, are located in and around today's Ji'an, Jilin. In 2004, the site was designated as a World Heritage Site by UNESCO. Since 1976, continuing archaeological excavations concentrated in the southeastern part of modern Gyeongju have revealed parts of the so-called Silla Wanggyeong (Silla royal capital). A number of excavations over the years have revealed temples such as Hwangnyongsa, Bunhwangsa, Heungryunsa, and 30 other sites. Signs of Paekche's capitals have also been excavated at the Mongchon Fortress and the Pungnap Fortress in Seoul.

== See also ==
- Heavenly Horse Tomb
- List of Korean monarchs
- Later Three Kingdoms
- Proto–Three Kingdoms period
