= Korean era name =

Names given to the regnal eras of Korean monarchs

- Hangul: 연호
- Hanja: 年號
- RR: yeonho
- MR: yŏnho

Korean era names were titles adopted in historical Korea for the purpose of year identification and numbering. Era names were used during the period of Silla, Goguryeo, Balhae, Taebong, Goryeo, Joseon, and the Korean Empire. Various Korean regimes officially adopted the era names of Chinese dynasties.

Era names originated in 140 BCE in China, during the reign of the Emperor Wu of Han. Since the middle of the 6th century CE, various Korean regimes started to use era names.

== List of Korean era names ==
This is a list of era names used by historical regimes on the Korean Peninsula. Several of these regimes officially adopted the era names of China; in such instances, the Chinese renditions of the era names are stated in parentheses.

=== Goguryeo ===
Era name	Period of use	Length of use	Remark
King Gwanggaeto of Goguryeo (r. 391–413 CE)
Yeongnak 永樂 영락	391–412 CE	22 years	
King Jangsu of Goguryeo (r. 413–491 CE)
Yeonsu 延壽 연수	451 CE–?	Unknown	
Disputed usage
Yeonggang 永康 영강	Unknown	Unknown	The 7th year of Yeonggang might be 396 CE, 418 CE, 483 CE, or 551 CE.
Geonheung 建興 건흥	Unknown	Unknown	The 5th year of Geonheung might be 476 CE, 536 CE, or 596 CE.
Yeon-ga 延嘉 연가	Unknown	Unknown	The 7th year of Yeon-ga might be 479 CE or 539 CE.

=== Silla ===
Era name	Period of use	Length of use	Remark
King Beopheung of Silla (r. 514–540 CE)
Geonwon 建元 건원	536–551 CE	16 years	Usage continued by King Jinheung of Silla upon his ascension to the throne.
King Jinheung of Silla (r. 540–576 CE)
Gaeguk 開國 개국	551–568 CE	18 years	
Daechang 大昌 대창	568–571 CE	3 years	
Hongje 鴻濟 홍제	572–584 CE	12 years	Usage continued by King Jinji of Silla and King Jinpyeong of Silla upon their ascension to the throne.
King Jinpyeong of Silla (r. 579–632 CE)
Geonbok 建福 건복	584–634 CE	51 years	Usage continued by Queen Seondeok of Silla upon her ascension to the throne.
Queen Seondeok of Silla (r. 632–647 CE)
Inpyeong 仁平 인평	634–647 CE	14 years	Usage continued by Queen Jindeok of Silla upon her ascension to the throne.
Queen Jindeok of Silla (r. 647–654 CE)
Taehwa 太和 태화	647–650 CE	4 years	
Yeonghwi (Yonghui) 永徽 영휘	650–654 CE	5 years	Adopted the era name of the Tang dynasty of China.
King Muyeol of Silla (r. 654–661 CE)
Yeonghwi (Yonghui) 永徽 영휘	654–655 CE	2 years	Adopted the era name of the Tang dynasty of China.
Hyeongyeong (Xianqing) 顯慶 현경	656–661 CE	6 years	Adopted the era name of the Tang dynasty of China.
Yongsak (Longshuo) 龍朔 용삭	661 CE	5 months	Adopted the era name of the Tang dynasty of China.
King Munmu of Silla (r. 661–681 CE)
Yongsak (Longshuo) 龍朔 용삭	661–663 CE	3 years	Adopted the era name of the Tang dynasty of China.
Indeok (Linde) 麟德 인덕	664–665 CE	2 years	Adopted the era name of the Tang dynasty of China.
Geonbong (Qianfeng) 乾封 건봉	666–668 CE	3 years	Adopted the era name of the Tang dynasty of China.
Chongjang (Zongzhang) 總章 총장	668–670 CE	3 years	Adopted the era name of the Tang dynasty of China.
Hamhyeong (Xianheng) 咸亨 함형	670–674 CE	5 years	Adopted the era name of the Tang dynasty of China.
Sangwon (Shangyuan) 上元 상원	674–676 CE	3 years	Adopted the era name of the Tang dynasty of China.
Uibong (Yifeng) 儀鳳 의봉	676–679 CE	4 years	Adopted the era name of the Tang dynasty of China.
Joro (Tiaolu) 調露 조로	679–680 CE	2 years	Adopted the era name of the Tang dynasty of China.
Yeongnyung (Yonglong) 永隆 영륭	680–681 CE	2 years	Adopted the era name of the Tang dynasty of China.
King Sinmun of Silla (r. 681–692 CE)
Yeongnyung (Yonglong) 永隆 영륭	681 CE	3 months	Adopted the era name of the Tang dynasty of China.
Gaeyo (Kaiyao) 開耀 개요	681–682 CE	2 years	Adopted the era name of the Tang dynasty of China.
Yeongsun (Yongchun) 永淳 영순	682–683 CE	2 years	Adopted the era name of the Tang dynasty of China.
Hongdo (Hongdao) 弘道 홍도	683 CE	1 month	Adopted the era name of the Tang dynasty of China.
Saseong (Sisheng) 嗣聖 사성	684 CE	2 months	Adopted the era name of the Tang dynasty of China.
Munmyeong (Wenming) 文明 문명	684 CE	10 months	Adopted the era name of the Tang dynasty of China.
Sugong (Chuigong) 垂拱 수공	685–688 CE	4 years	Adopted the era name of the Tang dynasty of China.
Yeongchang (Yongchang) 永昌 영창	689 CE	11 months	Adopted the era name of the Tang dynasty of China.
Jaecho (Zaichu) 載初 재초	689–690 CE	2 years	Adopted the era name of the Tang dynasty of China.
Cheonsu (Tianshou) 天授 천수	690–692 CE	3 years	Adopted the era name of the Wu Zhou dynasty of China.
Yeoui (Ruyi) 如意 여의	692 CE	4 months	Adopted the era name of the Wu Zhou dynasty of China.
King Hyoso of Silla (r. 692–702 CE)
Yeoui (Ruyi) 如意 여의	692 CE	3 months	Adopted the era name of the Wu Zhou dynasty of China.
Jangsu (Changshou) 長壽 장수	692–694 CE	3 years	Adopted the era name of the Wu Zhou dynasty of China.
Yeonjae (Yanzai) 延載 연재	694 CE	8 months	Adopted the era name of the Wu Zhou dynasty of China.
Jeungseong (Zhengsheng) 證聖 증성	695–696 CE	2 years	Adopted the era name of the Wu Zhou dynasty of China.
Mansetongcheon (Wansuitongtian) 萬歲通天 만세통천	696–697 CE	2 years	Adopted the era name of the Wu Zhou dynasty of China.
Singong (Shengong) 神功 신공	697 CE	4 months	Adopted the era name of the Wu Zhou dynasty of China.
Seongnyeok (Shengli) 聖曆 성력	698–700 CE	3 years	Adopted the era name of the Wu Zhou dynasty of China.
Gusi (Jiushi) 久視 구시	700–701 CE	2 years	Adopted the era name of the Wu Zhou dynasty of China.
Daejok (Dazu) 大足 대족	701 CE	10 months	Adopted the era name of the Wu Zhou dynasty of China.
Jang-an (Chang'an) 長安 장안	701–702 CE	2 years	Adopted the era name of the Wu Zhou dynasty of China.
King Seongdeok of Silla (r. 702–737 CE)
Jang-an (Chang'an) 長安 장안	702–704 CE	3 years	Adopted the era name of the Wu Zhou dynasty of China.
Sillyong (Shenlong) 神龍 신룡	705–707 CE	3 years	Adopted the era name of the Wu Zhou dynasty and Tang dynasty of China.
Gyeongnyong (Jinglong) 景龍 경룡	707–710 CE	4 years	Adopted the era name of the Tang dynasty of China.
Dangnyung (Tanglong) 唐隆 당륭	710 CE	2 months	Adopted the era name of the Tang dynasty of China.
Gyeong-un (Jingyun) 景雲 경운	710–712 CE	3 years	Adopted the era name of the Tang dynasty of China.
Taegeuk (Taiji) 太極 태극	712 CE	4 months	Adopted the era name of the Tang dynasty of China.
Yeonhwa (Yanhe) 延和 연화	712 CE	4 months	Adopted the era name of the Tang dynasty of China.
Gaewon (Kaiyuan) 開元 개원	713–737 CE	25 years	Adopted the era name of the Tang dynasty of China.
King Hyoseong of Silla (r. 737–742 CE)
Gaewon (Kaiyuan) 開元 개원	737–741 CE	5 years	Adopted the era name of the Tang dynasty of China.
Cheonbo (Tianbao) 天寶 천보	742 CE	5 months	Adopted the era name of the Tang dynasty of China.
King Gyeongdeok of Silla (r. 742–765 CE)
Cheonbo (Tianbao) 天寶 천보	742–756 CE	15 years	Adopted the era name of the Tang dynasty of China.
Jideok (Zhide) 至德 지덕	757–758 CE	2 years	Adopted the era name of the Tang dynasty of China.
Geonwon (Qianyuan) 乾元 건원	758–760 CE	3 years	Adopted the era name of the Tang dynasty of China.
Sangwon (Shangyuan) 上元 상원	760–761 CE	2 years	Adopted the era name of the Tang dynasty of China.
Boeung (Baoying) 寶應 보응	762–763 CE	2 years	Adopted the era name of the Tang dynasty of China.
Gwangdeok (Guangde) 廣德 광덕	764 CE	1 year	Adopted the era name of the Tang dynasty of China.
Yeongtae (Yongtai) 永泰 영태	765 CE	6 months	Adopted the era name of the Tang dynasty of China.
King Hyegong of Silla (r. 765–780 CE)
Yeongtae (Yongtai) 永泰 영태	765–766 CE	2 years	Adopted the era name of the Tang dynasty of China.
Daeryeok (Dali) 大曆 대력	766–779 CE	14 years	Adopted the era name of the Tang dynasty of China.
Geonjung (Jianzhong) 建中 건중	780 CE	4 months	Adopted the era name of the Tang dynasty of China.
King Seondeok of Silla (r. 780–785 CE)
Geonjung (Jianzhong) 建中 건중	780–783 CE	4 years	Adopted the era name of the Tang dynasty of China.
Heungwon (Xingyuan) 興元 흥원	784 CE	1 year	Adopted the era name of the Tang dynasty of China.
Jeongwon (Zhenyuan) 貞元 정원	785 CE	1 month	Adopted the era name of the Tang dynasty of China.
King Wonseong of Silla (r. 785–798 CE)
Jeongwon (Zhenyuan) 貞元 정원	785–798 CE	14 years	Adopted the era name of the Tang dynasty of China.
King Soseong of Silla (r. 798–800 CE)
Jeongwon (Zhenyuan) 貞元 정원	799–800 CE	2 years	Adopted the era name of the Tang dynasty of China.
King Aejang of Silla (r. 800–809 CE)
Jeongwon (Zhenyuan) 貞元 정원	800–805 CE	6 years	Adopted the era name of the Tang dynasty of China.
Yeongjeong (Yongzhen) 永貞 영정	805 CE	5 months	Adopted the era name of the Tang dynasty of China.
Wonhwa (Yuanhe) 元和 원화	806–809 CE	4 years	Adopted the era name of the Tang dynasty of China.
King Heondeok of Silla (r. 809–826 CE)
Wonhwa (Yuanhe) 元和 원화	809–820 CE	12 years	Adopted the era name of the Tang dynasty of China.
Janggyeong (Changqing) 長慶 장경	821–824 CE	4 years	Adopted the era name of the Tang dynasty of China.
Boryeok (Baoli) 寶曆 보력	825–826 CE	2 years	Adopted the era name of the Tang dynasty of China.
King Heungdeok of Silla (r. 826–836 CE)
Boryeok (Baoli) 寶曆 보력	826–827 CE	2 years	Adopted the era name of the Tang dynasty of China.
Daehwa (Dahe) 大和 대화	827–835 CE	9 years	Adopted the era name of the Tang dynasty of China.
Gaeseong (Kaicheng) 開成 개성	836 CE	1 year	Adopted the era name of the Tang dynasty of China.
King Huigang of Silla (r. 836–838 CE)
Gaeseong (Kaicheng) 開成 개성	836–838 CE	3 years	Adopted the era name of the Tang dynasty of China.
King Minae of Silla (r. 838–839 CE)
Gaeseong (Kaicheng) 開成 개성	838–839 CE	2 years	Adopted the era name of the Tang dynasty of China.
King Sinmu of Silla (r. 839 CE)
Gaeseong (Kaicheng) 開成 개성	839 CE	7 months	Adopted the era name of the Tang dynasty of China.
King Munseong of Silla (r. 839–857 CE)
Gaeseong (Kaicheng) 開成 개성	839–840 CE	2 years	Adopted the era name of the Tang dynasty of China.
Hoechang (Huichang) 會昌 회창	841–846 CE	6 years	Adopted the era name of the Tang dynasty of China.
Daejung (Dazhong) 大中 대중	847–857 CE	11 years	Adopted the era name of the Tang dynasty of China.
King Heonan of Silla (r. 857–861 CE)
Daejung (Dazhong) 大中 대중	857–860 CE	4 years	Adopted the era name of the Tang dynasty of China.
Hamtong (Xiantong) 咸通 함통	860–861 CE	2 years	Adopted the era name of the Tang dynasty of China.
King Gyeongmun of Silla (r. 861–875 CE)
Hamtong (Xiantong) 咸通 함통	861–875 CE	15 years	Adopted the era name of the Tang dynasty of China.
Geonbu (Qianfu) 乾符 건부	875 CE	6 months	Adopted the era name of the Tang dynasty of China.
King Heongang of Silla (r. 875–886 CE)
Geonbu (Qianfu) 乾符 건부	875–879 CE	5 years	Adopted the era name of the Tang dynasty of China.
Gwangmyeong (Guangming) 廣明 광명	880–882 CE	3 years	Adopted the era name of the Tang dynasty of China.
Junghwa (Zhonghe) 中和 중화	882–886 CE	5 years	Adopted the era name of the Tang dynasty of China.
Gwanggye (Guangqi) 光啓 광계	886 CE	2 months	Adopted the era name of the Tang dynasty of China.
King Jeonggang of Silla (r. 886–887 CE)
Gwanggye (Guangqi) 光啓 광계	886–887 CE	2 years	Adopted the era name of the Tang dynasty of China.
Queen Jinseong of Silla (r. 887–897 CE)
Gwanggye (Guangqi) 光啓 광계	887–888 CE	2 years	Adopted the era name of the Tang dynasty of China.
Mundeok (Wende) 文德 문덕	888 CE	11 months	Adopted the era name of the Tang dynasty of China.
Yonggi (Longji) 龍紀 용기	889 CE	1 year	Adopted the era name of the Tang dynasty of China.
Daesun (Dashun) 大順 대순	890–892 CE	3 years	Adopted the era name of the Tang dynasty of China.
Gyeongbok (Jingfu) 景福 경복	893 CE	1 year	Adopted the era name of the Tang dynasty of China.
Geonnyeong (Qianning) 乾寧 건녕	894–897 CE	4 years	Adopted the era name of the Tang dynasty of China.
King Hyogong of Silla (r. 897–912 CE)
Geonnyeong (Qianning) 乾寧 건녕	897–898 CE	2 years	Adopted the era name of the Tang dynasty of China.
Gwanghwa (Guanghua) 光化 광화	898–901 CE	4 years	Adopted the era name of the Tang dynasty of China.
Cheonbok (Tianfu) 天復 천복	901–904 CE	4 years	Adopted the era name of the Tang dynasty of China.
Cheonu (Tianyou) 天祐 천우	904–907 CE	4 years	Adopted the era name of the Tang dynasty of China.
Gaepyeong (Kaiping) 開平 개평	907–911 CE	5 years	Adopted the era name of the Later Liang dynasty of China.
Geonhwa (Qianhua) 乾化 건화	911–912 CE	2 years	Adopted the era name of the Later Liang dynasty of China.
King Sindeok of Silla (r. 912–917 CE)
Geonhwa (Qianhua) 乾化 건화	912–913 CE	2 years	Adopted the era name of the Later Liang dynasty of China.
Bongnyeok (Fengli) 鳳曆 봉력	913 CE	2 months	Adopted the era name of the Later Liang dynasty of China.
Geonhwa (Qianhua) 乾化 건화	913–915 CE	3 years	Adopted the era name of the Later Liang dynasty of China.
Jeongmyeong (Zhenming) 貞明 정명	915–917 CE	3 years	Adopted the era name of the Later Liang dynasty of China.
King Gyeongmyeong of Silla (r. 917–924 CE)
Jeongmyeong (Zhenming) 貞明 정명	917–921 CE	5 years	Adopted the era name of the Later Liang dynasty of China.
Yongdeok (Zhenming) 龍德 용덕	921–923 CE	3 years	Adopted the era name of the Later Liang dynasty of China.
Donggwang (Tongguang) 同光 동광	923–924 CE	2 years	Adopted the era name of the Later Tang dynasty of China.
King Gyeongae of Silla (r. 924–927 CE)
Donggwang (Tongguang) 同光 동광	924–926 CE	3 years	Adopted the era name of the Later Tang dynasty of China.
Cheonseong (Tiancheng) 天成 천성	926–927 CE	2 years	Adopted the era name of the Later Tang dynasty of China.
King Gyeongsun of Silla (r. 927–935 CE)
Cheonseong (Tiancheng) 天成 천성	927–930 CE	4 years	Adopted the era name of the Later Tang dynasty of China.
Jangheung (Changxing) 長興 장흥	930–933 CE	4 years	Adopted the era name of the Later Tang dynasty of China.
Eungsun (Yingshun) 應順 응순	934 CE	4 months	Adopted the era name of the Later Tang dynasty of China.
Cheongtae (Qingtai) 淸泰 청태	934–935 CE	2 years	Adopted the era name of the Later Tang dynasty of China.

==== Other regimes contemporaneous with Silla ====
Era name	Period of use	Length of use	Remark
Kim Hŏn-ch'ang (r. 822 CE)
Gyeong-un 慶雲 경운	822–825 CE	4 years	Usage continued by Kim Pŏm-mun upon his ascension to the throne.

=== Balhae ===
Era name	Period of use	Length of use	Remark
King Mu of Balhae (r. 719–737 CE)
Inan 仁安 인안	720–737 CE	18 years	Usage might be from 718 CE to 737 CE, for a total length of 20 years; or from 719 CE to 737 CE, for a total length of 19 years.
King Mun of Balhae (r. 737–793 CE)
Daeheung 大興 대흥	738–794 CE	57 years	Usage might be from 737 CE to 774 CE, then from 786 CE to 793 CE, for a total length of 45 years; or from 737 CE to 774 CE, then from 785 CE to 793 CE, for a total length of 46 years.
Boryeok 寶曆 보력	774–785 CE	12 years	Usage might be from 774 CE to 786 CE, for a total length of 13 years. Subsequently, reverted to Daeheung (大興; 대흥).
King Seong of Balhae (r. 793–794 CE)
Jungheung 中興 중흥	794 CE	1 year	
King Gang of Balhae (r. 794–809 CE)
Jeongnyeok 正曆 정력	795–809 CE	15 years	Usage might be from 794 CE to 808 CE, for a total length of 15 years; or from 795 CE to 807 CE, for a total length of 13 years.
King Jeong of Balhae (r. 809–812 CE)
Yeongdeok 永德 영덕	810–812 CE	3 years	Usage might be from 808 CE to 812 CE, for a total length of 5 years; or from 808 CE to 811 CE, for a total length of 4 years.
King Hui of Balhae (r. 812–817 CE)
Jujak 朱雀 주작	813–817 CE	5 years	Usage might be from 812 CE to 817 CE, for a total length of 6 years; or from 812 CE to 816 CE, for a total length of 5 years.
King Gan of Balhae (r. 817–818 CE)
Taesi 太始 태시	818 CE	1 year	Usage might be from 813 CE to 817 CE, for a total length of 5 years; or from 817 CE to 818 CE, for a total length of 2 years.
King Seon of Balhae (r. 818–830 CE)
Geonheung 建興 건흥	819–830 CE	12 years	Usage might be from 818 CE to 830 CE, for a total length of 13 years.
Dae Ijin (r. 830–857 CE)
Hamhwa 咸和 함화	831–857 CE	27 years	

=== Later Baekje ===
Era name	Period of use	Length of use	Remark
Kyŏn Hwŏn (r. 892–935 CE)
Jeonggae 正開 정개	900–936 CE	37 years	Usage continued by Kyŏn Sin-gŏm upon his ascension to the throne.

=== Taebong ===
Era name	Period of use	Length of use	Remark
Kung Ye (r. 901–918 CE)
Mutae 武泰 무태	904–905 CE	2 years	
Seongchaek 聖冊 성책	905–911 CE	7 years	
Sudeokmanse 水德萬歲 수덕만세	911–914 CE	4 years	
Jeonggae 政開 정개	914–918 CE	5 years	

=== Goryeo ===
Era name	Period of use	Length of use	Remark
King Taejo of Goryeo (r. 918–943 CE)
Cheonsu 天授 천수	918–933 CE	16 years	
Jangheung (Changxing) 長興 장흥	933 CE	10 months	Adopted the era name of the Later Tang dynasty of China.
Eungsun (Yingshun) 應順 응순	934 CE	4 months	Adopted the era name of the Later Tang dynasty of China.
Cheongtae (Qingtai) 淸泰 청태	934–938 CE	5 years	Adopted the era name of the Later Tang dynasty of China.
Cheonbok (Tianfu) 天福 천복	938–943 CE	6 years	Adopted the era name of the Later Jin dynasty of China.
King Hyejong of Goryeo (r. 943–945 CE)
Cheonbok (Tianfu) 天福 천복	944 CE	7 months	Adopted the era name of the Later Jin dynasty of China.
Gaeun (Kaiyun) 開運 개운	944–945 CE	2 years	Adopted the era name of the Later Jin dynasty of China.
King Jeongjong of Goryeo (r. 945–949 CE)
Gaeun (Kaiyun) 開運 개운	946–948 CE	3 years	Adopted the era name of the Later Jin dynasty of China.
Geonu (Qianyou) 乾祐 건우	948–949 CE	2 years	Adopted the era name of the Later Han dynasty of China.
King Gwangjong of Goryeo (r. 949–975 CE)
Gwangdeok 光德 광덕	949–952 CE	4 years	
Gwangsun (Guangshun) 廣順 광순	952–954 CE	3 years	Adopted the era name of the Later Zhou dynasty of China.
Hyeondeok (Xiande) 顯德 현덕	954–960 CE	7 years	Adopted the era name of the Later Zhou dynasty of China.
Junpung 峻豊 준풍	960–963 CE	4 years	
Geondeok (Qiande) 乾德 건덕	963–968 CE	6 years	Adopted the era name of the Northern Song dynasty of China.
Gaebo (Kaibao) 開寶 개보	968–975 CE	8 years	Adopted the era name of the Northern Song dynasty of China.
King Gyeongjong of Goryeo (r. 975–981 CE)
Gaebo (Kaibao) 開寶 개보	976 CE	1 year	Adopted the era name of the Northern Song dynasty of China.
Taepyeongheungguk (Taipingxingguo) 太平興國 태평흥국	976–981 CE	6 years	Adopted the era name of the Northern Song dynasty of China.
King Seongjong of Goryeo (r. 981–997 CE)
Taepyeongheungguk (Taipingxingguo) 太平興國 태평흥국	982–984 CE	3 years	Adopted the era name of the Northern Song dynasty of China.
Onghui (Yongxi) 雍熙 옹희	984–987 CE	4 years	Adopted the era name of the Northern Song dynasty of China.
Dangong (Duangong) 端拱 단공	988–989 CE	2 years	Adopted the era name of the Northern Song dynasty of China.
Sunhwa (Chunhua) 淳化 순화	990–994 CE	5 years	Adopted the era name of the Northern Song dynasty of China.
Tonghwa (Tonghe) 統和 통화	994–997 CE	4 years	Adopted the era name of the Liao dynasty of China.
King Mokjong of Goryeo (r. 997–1009 CE)
Tonghwa (Tonghe) 統和 통화	998–1009 CE	12 years	Adopted the era name of the Liao dynasty of China.
King Hyeonjong of Goryeo (r. 1009–1031 CE)
Tonghwa (Tonghe) 統和 통화	1010–1012 CE	3 years	Adopted the era name of the Liao dynasty of China.
Gaetae (Kaitai) 開泰 개태	1012–1015 CE	4 years	Adopted the era name of the Liao dynasty of China.
Daejungsangbu (Dazhongxiangfu) 大中祥符 대중상부	1016 CE	1 year	Adopted the era name of the Northern Song dynasty of China.
Cheonhui (Tianxi) 天禧 천희	1017–1022 CE	6 years	Adopted the era name of the Northern Song dynasty of China.
Geonheung (Qianxing) 乾興 건흥	1022 CE	3 months	Adopted the era name of the Northern Song dynasty of China.
Taepyeong (Taiping) 太平 태평	1022–1031 CE	10 years	Adopted the era name of the Liao dynasty of China.
King Deokjong of Goryeo (r. 1031–1034 CE)
Taepyeong (Taiping) 太平 태평	1032–1034 CE	3 years	Adopted the era name of the Liao dynasty of China.
King Jeongjong of Goryeo (r. 1034–1046 CE)
Taepyeong (Taiping) 太平 태평	1035–1038 CE	4 years	Adopted the era name of the Liao dynasty of China.
Junghui (Chongxi) 重熙 태평	1038–1046 CE	9 years	Adopted the era name of the Liao dynasty of China.
King Munjong of Goryeo (r. 1046–1083 CE)
Junghui (Chongxi) 重熙 태평	1047–1055 CE	9 years	Adopted the era name of the Liao dynasty of China.
Cheongnyeong (Qingning) 淸寧 청녕	1055–1064 CE	10 years	Adopted the era name of the Liao dynasty of China.
Hamong (Xianyong) 咸雍 함옹	1065–1074 CE	10 years	Adopted the era name of the Liao dynasty of China.
Daegang (Dakang) 大康 대강	1075–1082 CE	8 years	Adopted the era name of the Liao dynasty of China.
King Sunjong of Goryeo (r. 1083 CE)
Daegang (Dakang) 大康 대강	1083 CE	1 year	Adopted the era name of the Liao dynasty of China.
King Seonjong of Goryeo (r. 1083–1094 CE)
Daegang (Dakang) 大康 대강	1084 CE	1 year	Adopted the era name of the Liao dynasty of China.
Daean (Da'an) 大安 대안	1085–1094 CE	10 years	Adopted the era name of the Liao dynasty of China.
King Heonjong of Goryeo (r. 1094–1095 CE)
Suchang (Shouchang) 壽昌 수창	1095 CE	1 year	Adopted the era name of the Liao dynasty of China.
King Sukjong of Goryeo (r. 1095–1105 CE)
Suchang (Shouchang) 壽昌 수창	1096–1101 CE	6 years	Adopted the era name of the Liao dynasty of China.
Geontong (Qiantong) 乾統 건통	1101–1105 CE	5 years	Adopted the era name of the Liao dynasty of China.
King Yejong of Goryeo (r. 1105–1122 CE)
Geontong (Qiantong) 乾統 건통	1106–1110 CE	5 years	Adopted the era name of the Liao dynasty of China.
Cheongyeong (Tianqing) 天慶 천경	1111–1116 CE	6 years	Adopted the era name of the Liao dynasty of China.
King Injong of Goryeo (r. 1122–1146 CE)
Hwangtong (Huangtong) 皇統 황통	1141–1146 CE	6 years	Adopted the era name of the Jin dynasty of China.
King Uijong of Goryeo (r. 1146–1170 CE)
Hwangtong (Huangtong) 皇統 황통	1147–1149 CE	3 years	Adopted the era name of the Jin dynasty of China.
Cheondeok (Tiande) 天德 천덕	1149–1153 CE	5 years	Adopted the era name of the Jin dynasty of China.
Jeongwon (Zhenyuan) 貞元 정원	1153–1156 CE	4 years	Adopted the era name of the Jin dynasty of China.
Jeongnyung (Zhenglong) 正隆 정륭	1156–1161 CE	6 years	Adopted the era name of the Jin dynasty of China.
Daejeong (Dading) 大定 대정	1161–1170 CE	10 years	Adopted the era name of the Jin dynasty of China.
King Myeongjong of Goryeo (r. 1170–1197 CE)
Daejeong (Dading) 大定 대정	1171–1189 CE	19 years	Adopted the era name of the Jin dynasty of China.
Myeongchang (Mingchang) 明昌 명창	1190–1196 CE	7 years	Adopted the era name of the Jin dynasty of China.
Seung-an (Cheng'an) 承安 승안	1196–1197 CE	2 years	Adopted the era name of the Jin dynasty of China.
King Sinjong of Goryeo (r. 1197–1204 CE)
Seung-an (Cheng'an) 承安 승안	1198–1200 CE	3 years	Adopted the era name of the Jin dynasty of China.
Taehwa (Taihe) 泰和 태화	1201–1204 CE	4 years	Adopted the era name of the Jin dynasty of China.
King Huijong of Goryeo (r. 1204–1211 CE)
Taehwa (Taihe) 泰和 태화	1205–1208 CE	4 years	Adopted the era name of the Jin dynasty of China.
Daean (Da'an) 大安 대안	1209–1211 CE	3 years	Adopted the era name of the Jin dynasty of China.
King Gangjong of Goryeo (r. 1211–1213 CE)
Sunggyeong (Chongqing) 崇慶 숭경	1212–1213 CE	2 years	Adopted the era name of the Jin dynasty of China.
Jinyeong (Zhining) 至寧 지녕	1213 CE	5 months	Adopted the era name of the Jin dynasty of China.
Jeongu (Zhenyou) 貞祐 정우	1213 CE	3 months	Adopted the era name of the Jin dynasty of China.
King Gojong of Goryeo (r. 1213–1259 CE)
Jeongu (Zhenyou) 貞祐 정우	1214–1224 CE	11 years	Adopted the era name of the Jin dynasty of China.
King Wonjong of Goryeo (r. 1260–1274 CE)
Jungtong (Zhongtong) 中統 중통	1260–1264 CE	5 years	Adopted the era name of the Yuan dynasty of China.
Jiwon (Zhiyuan) 至元 지원	1264–1274 CE	11 years	Adopted the era name of the Yuan dynasty of China.
King Chungnyeol of Goryeo (r. 1274–1308 CE)
Jiwon (Zhiyuan) 至元 지원	1275–1294 CE	20 years	Adopted the era name of the Yuan dynasty of China.
Wonjeong (Yuanzhen) 元貞 원정	1295–1297 CE	3 years	Adopted the era name of the Yuan dynasty of China.
Daedeok (Dade) 大德 대덕	1297–1307 CE	11 years	Adopted the era name of the Yuan dynasty of China.
Jidae (Zhida) 至大 지대	1308 CE	1 year	Adopted the era name of the Yuan dynasty of China.
King Chungseon of Goryeo (r. 1308–1313 CE)
Jidae (Zhida) 至大 지대	1309–1311 CE	3 years	Adopted the era name of the Yuan dynasty of China.
Hwanggyeong (Huangqing) 皇慶 황경	1312–1313 CE	2 years	Adopted the era name of the Yuan dynasty of China.
King Chungsuk of Goryeo (r. 1313–1330 CE; first reign)
Yeonu (Yanyou) 延祐 연우	1314–1320 CE	7 years	Adopted the era name of the Yuan dynasty of China.
Jichi (Zhizhi) 至治 지치	1321–1323 CE	4 years	Adopted the era name of the Yuan dynasty of China.
Taejeong (Taiding) 泰定 태정	1324–1328 CE	5 years	Adopted the era name of the Yuan dynasty of China.
Chihwa (Zhihe) 致和 치화	1328 CE	8 months	Adopted the era name of the Yuan dynasty of China.
Cheonsun (Tianshun) 天順 천순	1328 CE	1 month	Adopted the era name of the Yuan dynasty of China.
Cheollyeok (Tianli) 天曆 천력	1328–1330 CE	3 years	Adopted the era name of the Yuan dynasty of China.
Jisun (Zhishun) 至順 지순	1330 CE	8 months	Adopted the era name of the Yuan dynasty of China.
King Chunghye of Goryeo (r. 1330–1332 CE; first reign)
Jisun (Zhishun) 至順 지순	1331–1332 CE	2 years	Adopted the era name of the Yuan dynasty of China.
King Chungsuk of Goryeo (r. 1332–1339 CE; second reign)
Jisun (Zhishun) 至順 지순	1332–1333 CE	2 years	Adopted the era name of the Yuan dynasty of China.
Wontong (Yuantong) 元統 원통	1333–1335 CE	3 years	Adopted the era name of the Yuan dynasty of China.
Jiwon (Zhiyuan) 至元 지원	1335–1339 CE	5 years	Adopted the era name of the Yuan dynasty of China.
King Chunghye of Goryeo (r. 1339–1344 CE; second reign)
Jiwon (Zhiyuan) 至元 지원	1340 CE	1 year	Adopted the era name of the Yuan dynasty of China.
Jijeong (Zhizheng) 至正 지정	1341–1344 CE	4 years	Adopted the era name of the Yuan dynasty of China.
King Chungmok of Goryeo (r. 1344–1348 CE)
Jijeong (Zhizheng) 至正 지정	1345–1348 CE	4 years	Adopted the era name of the Yuan dynasty of China.
King Chungjeong of Goryeo (r. 1349–1351 CE)
Jijeong (Zhizheng) 至正 지정	1349–1351 CE	3 years	Adopted the era name of the Yuan dynasty of China.
King Gongmin of Goryeo (r. 1351–1374 CE)
Jijeong (Zhizheng) 至正 지정	1352–1369 CE	18 years	Adopted the era name of the Yuan dynasty and Northern Yuan dynasty of China.
Hongmu (Hongwu) 洪武 홍무	1370–1374 CE	5 years	Adopted the era name of the Ming dynasty of China.
Wang U (r. 1374–1388 CE)
Hongmu (Hongwu) 洪武 홍무	1375–1377 CE	3 years	Adopted the era name of the Ming dynasty of China.
Seongwang (Xuanguang) 宣光 선광	1377–1378 CE	2 years	Adopted the era name of the Northern Yuan dynasty of China.
Hongmu (Hongwu) 洪武 홍무	1378–1388 CE	11 years	Adopted the era name of the Ming dynasty of China.
Wang Chang (r. 1388–1389 CE)
Hongmu (Hongwu) 洪武 홍무	1388–1389 CE	2 years	Adopted the era name of the Ming dynasty of China.
King Gongyang of Goryeo (r. 1389–1392 CE)
Hongmu (Hongwu) 洪武 홍무	1389–1392 CE	4 years	Adopted the era name of the Ming dynasty of China.

==== Other regimes contemporaneous with Goryeo ====
Era name	Period of use	Length of use	Remark
Myocheong (r. 1135 CE)
Cheongae 天開 천개	1135 CE	1 year	

=== Joseon ===
Era name	Period of use	Length of use	Remark
King Taejo of Joseon (r. 1392–1398 CE)
Hongmu (Hongwu) 洪武 홍무	1392–1398 CE	7 years	Adopted the era name of the Ming dynasty of China.
King Jeongjong of Joseon (r. 1398–1400 CE)
Geonmun (Jianwen) 建文 건문	1399–1400 CE	2 years	Adopted the era name of the Ming dynasty of China.
King Taejong of Joseon (r. 1400–1418 CE)
Geonmun (Jianwen) 建文 건문	1401–1402 CE	2 years	Adopted the era name of the Ming dynasty of China.
Hongmu (Hongwu) 洪武 홍무	1402 CE	7 months	Adopted the era name of the Ming dynasty of China.
Yeongnak (Yongle) 永樂 영락	1403–1418 CE	16 years	Adopted the era name of the Ming dynasty of China.
King Sejong of Joseon (r. 1418–1450 CE)
Yeongnak (Yongle) 永樂 영락	1419–1424 CE	6 years	Adopted the era name of the Ming dynasty of China.
Honghui (Hongxi) 洪熙 홍희	1425 CE	1 year	Adopted the era name of the Ming dynasty of China.
Seondeok (Xuande) 宣德 선덕	1426–1435 CE	10 years	Adopted the era name of the Ming dynasty of China.
Jeongtong (Zhengtong) 正統 정통	1436–1449 CE	14 years	Adopted the era name of the Ming dynasty of China.
Gyeongtae (Jingtai) 景泰 경태	1450 CE	1 year	Adopted the era name of the Ming dynasty of China.
King Munjong of Joseon (r. 1450–1452 CE)
Gyeongtae (Jingtai) 景泰 경태	1451–1452 CE	2 years	Adopted the era name of the Ming dynasty of China.
King Danjong of Joseon (r. 1452–1455 CE)
Gyeongtae (Jingtai) 景泰 경태	1453–1455 CE	3 years	Adopted the era name of the Ming dynasty of China.
King Sejo of Joseon (r. 1455–1468 CE)
Gyeongtae (Jingtai) 景泰 경태	1455–1457 CE	3 years	Adopted the era name of the Ming dynasty of China.
Cheonsun (Tianshun) 天順 천순	1457–1464 CE	8 years	Adopted the era name of the Ming dynasty of China.
Seonghwa (Chenghua) 成化 성화	1465–1468 CE	4 years	Adopted the era name of the Ming dynasty of China.
King Yejong of Joseon (r. 1468–1469 CE)
Seonghwa (Chenghua) 成化 성화	1469 CE	1 year	Adopted the era name of the Ming dynasty of China.
King Seongjong of Joseon (r. 1469–1494 CE)
Seonghwa (Chenghua) 成化 성화	1470–1487 CE	18 year	Adopted the era name of the Ming dynasty of China.
Hongchi (Hongzhi) 弘治 홍치	1488–1494 CE	7 year	Adopted the era name of the Ming dynasty of China.
Yi Yung (r. 1494–1506 CE)
Hongchi (Hongzhi) 弘治 홍치	1495–1505 CE	11 year	Adopted the era name of the Ming dynasty of China.
Jeongdeok (Zhengde) 正德 정덕	1506 CE	9 months	Adopted the era name of the Ming dynasty of China.
King Jungjong of Joseon (r. 1506–1544 CE)
Jeongdeok (Zhengde) 正德 정덕	1506–1521 CE	16 years	Adopted the era name of the Ming dynasty of China.
Gajeong (Jiajing) 嘉靖 가정	1522–1544 CE	23 years	Adopted the era name of the Ming dynasty of China.
King Injong of Joseon (r. 1544–1545 CE)
Gajeong (Jiajing) 嘉靖 가정	1545 CE	1 year	Adopted the era name of the Ming dynasty of China.
King Myeongjong of Joseon (r. 1545–1567 CE)
Gajeong (Jiajing) 嘉靖 가정	1546–1566 CE	21 years	Adopted the era name of the Ming dynasty of China.
Yunggyeong (Longqing) 隆慶 융경	1567 CE	1 year	Adopted the era name of the Ming dynasty of China.
King Seonjo of Joseon (r. 1567–1608 CE)
Yunggyeong (Longqing) 隆慶 융경	1568–1572 CE	5 years	Adopted the era name of the Ming dynasty of China.
Mallyeok (Wanli) 萬曆 만력	1573–1608 CE	36 years	Adopted the era name of the Ming dynasty of China.
Yi Hon (r. 1608–1623 CE)
Mallyeok (Wanli) 萬曆 만력	1609–1620 CE	12 years	Adopted the era name of the Ming dynasty of China.
Taechang (Taichang) 泰昌 태창	1620–1621 CE	4 months	Adopted the era name of the Ming dynasty of China.
Cheongye (Tianqi) 天啓 천계	1621–1623 CE	3 years	Adopted the era name of the Ming dynasty of China.
King Injo of Joseon (r. 1623–1649 CE)
Cheongye (Tianqi) 天啓 천계	1623–1627 CE	5 years	Adopted the era name of the Ming dynasty of China.
Sungjeong (Chongzhen) 崇禎 숭정	1628–1637 CE	10 years	Adopted the era name of the Ming dynasty of China. Usage continued informally within the Joseon royal court after 1637 CE well into the 19th century CE. This practice is known as Sungjeonggiwon.
Sungdeok (Chongde) 崇德 숭덕	1637–1643 CE	7 years	Adopted the era name of the Qing dynasty of China.
Sunchi (Shunzhi) 順治 순치	1644–1649 CE	6 years	Adopted the era name of the Qing dynasty of China.
King Hyojong of Joseon (r. 1649–1659 CE)
Sunchi (Shunzhi) 順治 순치	1650–1659 CE	10 years	Adopted the era name of the Qing dynasty of China.
King Hyeonjong of Joseon (r. 1659–1674 CE)
Sunchi (Shunzhi) 順治 순치	1660–1661 CE	2 years	Adopted the era name of the Qing dynasty of China.
Ganghui (Kangxi) 康熙 강희	1662–1674 CE	13 years	Adopted the era name of the Qing dynasty of China.
King Sukjong of Joseon (r. 1674–1720 CE)
Ganghui (Kangxi) 康熙 강희	1675–1720 CE	46 years	Adopted the era name of the Qing dynasty of China.
King Gyeongjong of Joseon (r. 1720–1724 CE)
Ganghui (Kangxi) 康熙 강희	1721–1722 CE	2 years	Adopted the era name of the Qing dynasty of China.
Ongjeong (Yongzheng) 雍正 옹정	1723–1724 CE	2 years	Adopted the era name of the Qing dynasty of China.
King Yeongjo of Joseon (r. 1724–1776 CE)
Ongjeong (Yongzheng) 雍正 옹정	1725–1735 CE	11 years	Adopted the era name of the Qing dynasty of China.
Geollyung (Qianlong) 乾隆 건륭	1736–1776 CE	41 years	Adopted the era name of the Qing dynasty of China.
King Jeongjo of Joseon (r. 1776–1800 CE)
Geollyung (Qianlong) 乾隆 건륭	1777–1795 CE	19 years	Adopted the era name of the Qing dynasty of China.
Gagyeong (Jiaqing) 嘉慶 가경	1796–1800 CE	5 years	Adopted the era name of the Qing dynasty of China.
King Sunjo of Joseon (r. 1800–1834 CE)
Gagyeong (Jiaqing) 嘉慶 가경	1801–1820 CE	20 years	Adopted the era name of the Qing dynasty of China.
Dogwang (Daoguang) 道光 도광	1821–1834 CE	14 years	Adopted the era name of the Qing dynasty of China.
King Heonjong of Joseon (r. 1834–1849 CE)
Dogwang (Daoguang) 道光 도광	1835–1849 CE	15 years	Adopted the era name of the Qing dynasty of China.
King Cheoljong of Joseon (r. 1849–1864 CE)
Dogwang (Daoguang) 道光 도광	1850 CE	1 year	Adopted the era name of the Qing dynasty of China.
Hampung (Xianfeng) 咸豊 함풍	1851–1861 CE	11 years	Adopted the era name of the Qing dynasty of China.
Dongchi (Tongzhi) 同治 동치	1862–1863 CE	2 years	Adopted the era name of the Qing dynasty of China.
King Gojong of Joseon (r. 1864–1897 CE; as King of Joseon)
Dongchi (Tongzhi) 同治 동치	1864–1874 CE	10 years	Adopted the era name of the Qing dynasty of China.
Gwangseo (Guangxu) 光緖 광서	1875–1894 CE	20 years	Adopted the era name of the Qing dynasty of China.
Gaeguk 開國 개국	1894–1895 CE	2 years	The 1st year of Gaeguk was officially taken to be 1392 CE; 1894 CE was therefore the 503rd year of Gaeguk.
Geonyang 建陽 건양	1896–1897 CE	2 years	

=== Korean Empire ===
Era name	Period of use	Length of use	Remark
Emperor Gojong of Korea (r. 1897–1907 CE; as Emperor of Korean Empire)
Gwangmu 光武 광무	1897–1907 CE	11 years	
Emperor Sunjong of Korea (r. 1907–1910 CE)
Yunghui 隆熙 융희	1907–1910 CE	4 years	

=== Korea under Japanese rule ===
The Japanese renditions of the era names are stated in parentheses.

Era name	Period of use	Length of use	Remark
Myeongchi (Meiji) 明治 명치	1910–1912 CE	3 years	Era name of the Emperor Meiji. 1910 CE was the 43rd year of Meiji.
Daejeong (Taishō) 大正 대정	1912–1926 CE	15 years	Era name of the Emperor Taishō.
Sohwa (Shōwa) 昭和 소화	1926–1945 CE	20 years	Era name of the Emperor Shōwa.

== Modern era systems ==
=== Republic of Korea ===
Era name	Period of use	Length of use	Remark
Daehanminguk 대한민국 大韓民國	1919–1948 CE	29 years	"Daehanminguk" literally means "Republic of Korea". Start to use from Provisional Government of the Republic of Korea to before establish First Republic of Korea.
Dangun-giwon 단군기원 檀君紀元	1948–1961 CE	13 years	"Dangun-giwon" means "Age of Lord Dangun". Years were counted from the foundation of Gojoseon in 2333 BC (regarded as year one), the date of the legendary founding of Korea by Dangun, hence these Dangi (단기; 檀紀) years were 4278 to 4294.
Seoryeokgiwon 서력기원 西曆紀元	1962–present	Current era	"Age of Seoryeok [Western Calendar]", i.e. "Common Era"

=== Democratic People's Republic of Korea ===
Era name	Period of use	Length of use	Remark
Juche 주체	1997–2024	27 years	1912 (Kim Il-sung's birth date) is designated as the first year and has been used from 1997 to 2024.
Soryokkiwon 서력기원 西曆紀元	2024–present	Current era	"Age of Soryok [Western Calendar]", i.e. "Common Era"

The North Korean government and associated organizations used a variation of the Gregorian calendar with a Juche year based on April 15, 1912 CE, the date of birth of Kim Il-sung, as year 1. There was no Juche year 0. The calendar was introduced in 1997. Months were unchanged from those in the standard Gregorian calendar. In many instances, the Juche year was given after the CE year, for example, 24 October 2026 Juche 115. But in North Korean publications, the Juche year was usually placed before the corresponding CE year, as in Juche 115 (2026).

== See also ==
- History of Korea
- List of monarchs of Korea
- Korean imperial titles
- Korean calendar
- Chinese era name

== Bibliography ==
- https://web.archive.org/web/20070928031555/http://tiny.britannica.co.kr/bol/topic.asp?article_id=b15a3467a
- https://web.archive.org/web/20070928031307/http://tiny.britannica.co.kr/bol/view-table.asp?med_id=b15a346701t1.html
- https://web.archive.org/web/20070930193917/http://wondreams.hihome.com/temasogo_goguryeo2.htm
- http://100.empas.com/dicsearch/pentry.html?i=171244
- https://web.archive.org/web/20070930061902/http://www.ikgu.com/tt/717
- A Guide to Korean Characters, 2nd Revised Edition, Bruce K. Grant, Hollym Publishing, Seoul, South Korea, 1982.
- Sources of Korean Tradition, Volume One, Peter H. Lee, Yongho Choe, Hugh H.W. Kang (Eds), Columbia University Press, 1996 (Reign Name Translations, p. 21).
