= Jeonggae =

Jeonggae may refer to two different Korean era names:

- Jeonggae (正開; 901–936), the only era name in Later Baekje
- Jeonggae (政開; 914–918), era name used by the only Taebong ruler Gung Ye
