= Jinseong of Silla =

51st monarch of Silla (r. 887–897)

Queen Jinseong 진성여왕 眞聖女王

Queen of Silla
- Reign: 887–897
- Coronation: 887
- Predecessor: Jeonggang of Silla
- Successor: Hyogong of Silla
- Born: c. 865
- Died: January 4, 898 (aged c. 32–33); Gyeongju, Gyeongsangbuk-do, Unified Silla
- Burial: Hwangsan, Gyeongju
- Consort: Kim Wi-hong, King Hyeseong
- House: Gyeongju Kim
- Father: Gyeongmun of Silla
- Mother: Queen Munui
- Religion: Buddhism

- Jinseong of Silla
- Hangul: 김만; 김원
- Hanja: 金曼; 金垣
- RR: Gim Man; Gim Won
- MR: Kim Man; Kim Wŏn

Monarch name
- Hangul: 진성여왕
- Hanja: 眞聖女王
- RR: Jinseong yeowang
- MR: Chinsŏng yŏwang

Jinseong (c. 865–898), personal name Kim Man, was the fifty-first ruler of the Korean kingdom, Silla from 887 to 897. She was also Silla's third and last reigning queen after Seondeok and Jindeok. Her reign saw the weakening of Unified Silla and the beginning of the Later Three Kingdoms period. According to her older brother King Jeonggang, she was smart by nature and tall like a man.

== Life ==
Jinseong was the only daughter of King Gyeongmun and Queen Munui. Being the younger sister of Heongang and Jeonggang, she rose to the throne when both of her brothers died without issue. When King Jeonggang was dying in 887, he appointed his sister Jinseong as his heir, justifying the choice of a female monarch by pointing at Seondeok's and Jindeok's successful reigns. Though Seondeok and Jindeok's successful reigns were invoked to help Jinseong secure the throne, Silla's third queen regnant ultimately did not live up to the expectations of her predecessors.

=== Reign ===
According to the Samguk sagi, Jinseong did licentious conduct that bringing attractive men into the palace and committing lewd acts with them. She also carried on an affair with the Gakgan ("high commander") Kim Wi-hong. But in Samguk yusa, it states that Queen Jinseong married her paternal uncle Kim Wi-hong. In Samguk Yusa, Yang-pae (양패), the youngest son of Queen Jinseong, is mentioned. The Samguk sagi was written by Confucianists, who held a negative view of female rule, so the precise details therein should perhaps not be taken at face value. Brigham Young University historian Richard McBride supports this point, claiming that historical Korean scholarship has conventionally blamed the demise of Silla on Jinseong, even though Silla was already gripped by political chaos and decline prior to her reign.

In contrast, according to the records of her contemporary Ch'oe Ch'i-wŏn, she was a good-hearted monarch with no greed, who accepted his various recommendations to reform the government of Silla to prevent its downfall. McBride notes that Choe, a talented poet and scholar-official, had presented a ten-point memorial on current affairs to Queen Jinseong, who received it with gladness and advanced Choe's career to the highest capital rank for someone of his status. However, due to Silla's Bone-rank system, Choe's recommended reforms were unable to materialize as the true-bone nobles who monopolized the Sillan government discriminated against lower-ranked nobles like Choe and hindered his efforts.

During her reign, public order collapsed. The crisis began when a serious drought in 888 forced local governments to provide tax relief. Although Jinseong had attempted to assuage the people, by 889, the state's storehouses were empty and she was forced to send out commissioners to collect taxes, which gave rise to banditry in the far-flung regions of Silla. Prefectural officials or local true-bone nobles were incited to revolt. While Jinseong was able to quell the most important rebellions which threatened the Sillan heartland, Silla was beginning to lose control of its more remote regions.

Her later reign saw the emergence of Yang Gil in the northwest (who was later surpassed by Kung Ye) and Kyŏn Hwŏn in the southwest rebelled and founded their own kingdoms, reviving the fallen states of Goguryeo and Baekje as Later Goguryeo and Later Baekje respectively. In 895, Jinseong appointed Heongang's illegitimate son Kim Yo as Crown Prince. By 896, the tenth year of Jinseong's reign, bandits had overrun southwestern Silla and they raided as far east as the outskirts of the Sillan capital. This incursion led to her decision to abdicate in favor of Kim Yo. In June 897, she abdicated the throne and later died in December 897. She was buried to the north of Sajasa temple in Gyeongju.

== Legacy ==
She ordered the first compilation of hyangga works, Samdaemok (삼대목), to be created.

== Family ==
Parents

- Father: Gyeongmun of Silla (841–875)
  - Grandfather: Kim Kye-myŏng
  - Grandmother: Madam Gwanghwa (광화부인)
- Mother: Queen Munui of the Kim clan (문의왕후 김씨)
  - Maternal grandfather: Heonan of Silla (헌안왕)
  - Maternal grandmother: Unknown

Consorts and their respective issue:

- Kim Wi-hong (김위홍), honored as King Hyeseong (혜성왕; ?–888), her uncle (Note: Second son of Kim Kye-myŏng (김계명; 820–?) and Lady Gwanghwa (광화부인; 826–?). By birth, Kim Wi-hong was Queen Jinseong's uncle and by marriage her husband.)
  - Youngest Son: Kim Yang-pae (김양패)
  - Unknown Older Brother(s) of Yang-pae

== In popular culture ==
- Portrayed by Noh Hyun Hee in the 2000 KBS1 TV series Taejo Wang Geon
- Portrayed by Kim Hye-ri in the 2003 film The Legend of the Evil Lake

== See also ==
- Unified Silla
- Later Three Kingdoms of Korea

== Sources ==
- 진성여왕. Doosan Encyclopedia (in Korean).

== Bibliography ==
- McBride, Richard (2024), The Three Kingdoms of Korea: Lost Civilizations

Jinseong of Silla House of Kim Born: c. 865 Died: 897
Regnal titles
Preceded by Jeonggang	Queen of Silla; Silla; 887–897	Succeeded by Hyogong
