= Kim Ye =

Kim Ye may refer to:

- Kim Ye (rebel) (died 868), Silla royal family member and rebel
- Kim Ye (aristocrat), Later Three Kingdoms local aristocratic lord
- Kim Ye (multidisciplinary artist)
