= List of monarchs of Korea =

Monarchs of Korea

Details
- First monarch: Dangun (legendary)
- Last monarch: Sunjong
- Formed: 2333 BC (legendary)
- Abolished: 29 August 1910
- Residences: Varies according to dynasty, most recently Gyeongbokgung in Seoul

This is a list of monarchs of Korea, arranged by dynasty. Names are romanized according to the South Korean Revised Romanization of Korean. McCune–Reischauer romanizations may be found in the articles about the individual monarchs.

== Gojoseon ==
Gojoseon (2333 BC – 108 BC) was the first Korean kingdom. According to legend, it was founded by Dangun in 2333 BC.

Bronze Age archaeological evidence of Gojoseon culture is found in northern Korea and Liaoning. By the 9th to 4th century BC, various historical and archaeological evidence shows Gojoseon was a flourishing state and a self-declared kingdom.

Both Dangun and Gija are believed to be mythological figures, but recent findings suggest and theorize that since Gojoseon was a kingdom with artifacts dating back to the 4th millennium BC, Dangun and Gija may have been royal or imperial titles used for the monarchs of Gojoseon, hence the use of Dangun for 1900 years.

=== Earliest mythological rulers ===
Dangun Joseon
#	Portrait	Name		Period of reign
#	Portrait	Westernized	Hangul/Hanja	Period of reign
1		Dangun Wanggeom	단군왕검 (檀君王儉)	2333(?) – ? BC
Gija Joseon
#	Portrait	Name		Period of reign
#	Portrait	Westernized	Hangul/Hanja	Period of reign
1		Gija	기자 (箕子)	1122(?) – ? BC

=== Historical rulers ===
Gojoseon
#	Portrait	Name		Period of reign
#	Portrait	Westernized	Hangul/Hanja	Period of reign
?		Unknown ruler	Unknown	4th century BC
	···	···	···	···
?		King Bu	부왕 (否王)	232–220 BC
?		King Jun	준왕 (準王)	220–195 BC
Wiman Joseon
#	Portrait	Name		Period of reign
#	Portrait	Westernized	Hangul/Hanja	Period of reign
1		Wi Man	위만 (衛滿)	194–? BC
2		Unknown (Son of Wi Man)	Unknown	?–?
3		King Ugeo	우거왕 (右渠王)	?–108 BC

== Buyeo ==
Buyeo (c. 2nd century BC – 494 AD) ruled in modern-day Northeast China. Although records are sparse and contradictory, it is speculated that in the 1st century BC, Eastern Buyeo branched out, after which the original Buyeo is sometimes referred to as Northern Buyeo. Its remnants were absorbed by the neighboring and brotherhood kingdom of Goguryeo in 494.

=== Early Eastern Buyeo ===
#	Portrait	Personal names		Period of reign
#	Portrait	Westernized	Hangul/Hanhan	Period of reign
1		Hae Buru	해부루 (解夫婁)	?–? BC
2		Hae Geumwa	해금와 (解金蛙)	48–20 BC
3		Hae Daeso	해대소 (解臺素)	20 BC – 22 AD

=== Galsa Buyeo ===
#	Portrait	Name		Period of reign
#	Portrait	Westernized	Hangul/Hanja	Period of reign
1		Founder of Galsa	갈사왕 (曷思王)	21–?
?		Hae Dodu	해도두 (解都頭)	?–68

=== Later Northern Buyeo ===
#	Portrait	Name		Period of reign	Comment
#	Portrait	Westernized	Hangul/Hanja	Period of reign	Comment
?		Butae	부태왕 (夫台王)	?–?, 2nd century	He invaded Xuantu Commandery, but was defeated with a huge loss.
	···	···	···	···	
?		Wigutae	위구태왕 (慰仇太王)	?–?, 2nd century	Married with Gongsun clan.
?		Ganwigeo	간위거왕 (簡位居王)	?–?, 3rd century	He only had illegitimate son Maryeo.
?		Maryeo	마려왕 (麻余王)	?–?, 3rd century	Wigeo holding the post of Daesa led state affairs.Paid tribute to Wei.
	···	···	···	···	
?		Uiryeo	의려왕 (依慮王)	?–285	Rose to the throne at the age of six. Committed suicide after a huge defeat after a battle with the Xianbei.
?		Uira	의라왕 (依羅王)	286–?	Exiled to Okjeo. Restored old territory after getting help from Jin.
	···	···	···	···	
?		Hyeon	현왕 (玄王)	?–346	
?		Yeoul	여울왕 (餘蔚王)	?–384	
	···	···	···	···	
?		Jan	잔 (孱)	?–494	

== Goguryeo ==
Goguryeo (37 BC – 668 AD) was one of the Three Kingdoms of Korea. Goguryeo rulers may have used the title of Taewang (Korean: 태왕; Hanja: 太王; lit. 'greatest king').

#	Portrait	Personal names (Note: Goguryeo kings had the surname Go, except for the second Yuri through fifth Mobon, whose surnames are recorded as Hae. All of the kings are recorded to belong to the same patrilineal bloodline. It is not clear whether the two surnames are different transcription of the same name, or evidence of a power struggle.) (Note: The Samguk sagi and Samguk yusa, and sometimes other records mention "other names," "birth names," "childhood names," or "personal names.")		Period of reign	Posthumous name (Note: The king names generally derive from the location of the king's burial, and do not necessarily correspond to the Chinese concept of Posthumous name.)	
#	Portrait	Westernized	Hangul/Hanja	Period of reign	Westernized	Hangul/Hanja
1		Go Jumong; Go Chumo; Go Sanghae	고주몽 (高朱蒙) 고추모 (高鄒牟) 고상해 (高象解)	37–19 BC	Chumoseong (Note: The Jolbon line names and dates are from the Samguk sagi. The Wei shu History of the Wei dynasty gives the following names: 朱蒙 Jumong, 閭達 Yeodal, 始閭諧 Shiryeohae, 如栗 Yeoyul, and 莫來 Mangnae. The legendary line had already been formed with some variants in the early 5th century when king Jangsu built a monument for his father and Goguryeo made contact with the Northern Wei. The inscription of that monument gives these names: 鄒牟 Chumo, 儒留 Yuryu, and 大朱留 Daejuryu. The connections between those names are not clear.); Dongmyeong; Dongmyeongseong	추모성왕 (鄒牟聖王) 동명왕 (東明王) 동명성왕 (東明聖王)
2		Hae Yuri; Hae Yuryu; Hae Nuri	해유리 (解琉璃) 해유류 (解孺留) 해누리 (解類利)	19 BC – 18 AD	Yuri (Note: Goguryeo kings had the surname Go, except for the second (Yuri) through fifth (Mobon), whose surnames are recorded as Hae. All of the kings are recorded to belong to the same patrilineal bloodline. It is not clear whether the two surnames are different transcription of the same name, or evidence of a power struggle.); Yurimyeong	유리왕 (琉璃王) 유리명왕 (琉璃明王)
3		Hae Muhyul	해무휼 (解無恤)	18–44	Daemusin; Daehaejuryu	대무신왕 (大武神王) 대해주류왕 (大解朱留王)
4		Hae Saekju	해색주 (解色朱)	44–48	Minjung	민중왕 (閔中王)
5		Hae U Hae Aeru; Hae Mangnae	해우 (解憂) 해애루 (解愛婁) 해막래 (解莫來)	48–53	Mobon	모본왕 (慕本王)
6		Go Gung; Go Eosu	고궁 (高宮) 고어수 (高於漱)	53–146 (Note: According to the Book of the Later Han, Taejo died in 121, and his son Chadae stepped up.)	Taejo [the Great] Gukjo	태조[대]왕 (太祖[大]王) 국조왕 (國祖王)
7		Go Suseong	고수성 (高遂成)	146–165	Chadae	차대왕 (次大王)
8		Go Baekgo; Go Baekgu	고백고 (高伯固) 고백구 (高伯句)	165–179	Sindae	신대왕 (新大王)
9		Go Nam-mu	고남무 (高男武)	179–197	Gogukcheon; Gukyang	고국천왕 (故國川王) 국양왕 (國襄王)
10		Go Yeon-u; Go Iimo	고연우 (高延優) 고이이모 (高伊夷謨)	197–227	Sansang	산상왕 (山上王)
11		Go Uwigeo; Go Wigung; Go Gyoche	고우위거 (高憂位居) 고위궁 (高位宮) 고교체 (高郊彘)	227–248	Dongcheon; Dongyang	동천왕 (東川王) 동양왕 (東襄王)
12		Go Yeonbul	고연불 (高然弗)	248–270	Jungcheon; Jungyang	중천왕 (中川王) 중양왕 (中襄王)
13		Go Yangno; Go Yagu	고약로 (高藥盧) 고약우 (高若友)	270–292	Seocheon; Seoyang	서천왕 (西川王) 서양왕 (西襄王)
14		Go Sangbu; Go Sapsiru	고상부 (高相夫) 고삽시루 (高歃矢婁)	292–300	Bongsang; Chigal	봉상왕 (烽上王) 치갈왕 (雉葛王)
15		Go Eulbul; Go Ubul	고을불 (高乙弗) 고우불 (高憂弗)	300–331	Micheon; Hoyang	미천왕 (美川王) 호양왕 (好壤王)
16		Go Sayu; Go Yu; Go Soe	고사유 (高斯由) 고유 (高劉) 고쇠 (高釗)	331–371	Gogugwon	고국원왕 (故國原王)
17		Go Gubu	고구부 (高丘夫)	371–384	Sosurim	소수림왕 (小獸林王)
18		Go Yiryeon; Go Eojiji	고이련 (高伊連) 고어지지 (高於只支)	384–391	Gogugyang	고국양왕 (故國壤王)
19		Go Damdeok	고담덕 (高談德)	391–412	Gwanggaeto	광개토왕 (廣開土王)
20		Go Georyeon; Go Yeon	고거련 (高巨連) 고연 (高璉)	412–491	Jangsu	장수왕 (長壽王)
21		Go Na-un; Go Un	고나운 (高羅雲) 고운 (高雲)	491–519	Munjamyeong	문자명왕 (文咨明王)
22		Go Heung-an; Go An	고흥안 (高興安) 고안 (高安)	519–531	Anjang	안장왕 (安藏王)
23		Go Boyeon; Go Yeon	고보연 (高寶延) 고연 (高延)	531–545	Anwon	안원왕 (安原王)
24		Go Pyeongseong	고평성 (高平成)	545–559	Yangwon; Yanggang	양원왕 (陽原王) 양강왕 (陽崗王)
25		Go Yangseong; Go Yang; Go Tang	고양성 (高陽成) 고양 (高陽) 고탕 (高湯)	559–590	Pyeongwon; Pyeonggang	평원왕 (平原王) 평강왕(平岡王)
26		Go Won	고원 (高元)	590–618	Yeongyang; Pyongyang	영양왕 (嬰陽王) 평양왕 (平陽王)
27		Go Geonmu; Go Mu; Go Seong	고건무 (高建武) 고무 (高武) 고성 (高成)	618–642	Yeongnyu	영류왕 (榮留王)
28		Go Bojang; Go Jang	고보장 (高寶藏) 고장 (高藏)	642–668	None	None

== Baekje ==
Baekje (18 BC – 660 AD) was one of the Three Kingdoms of Korea. Temple names were the same as personal names, unless noted otherwise.

#	Portrait	Personal names		Period of reign	Posthumous name	
#	Portrait	Westernized	Hangul/Hanja	Period of reign	Westernized	Hangul/Hanja
1		Buyeo Onjo	부여온조 (扶餘溫祚)	18 BC – 28 AD	Onjo	온조왕 (溫祚王)
2		Buyeo Daru	부여다루 (扶餘多婁)	28–77	Daru	다루왕 (多婁王)
3		Buyeo Giru	부여기루 (扶餘己婁)	77–128	Giru	기루왕 (己婁王)
4		Buyeo Gaeru	부여개루 (扶餘蓋婁)	128–166	Gaeru	개루왕 (蓋婁王)
5		Buyeo Chogo; Buyeo Sogo; Buyeo Sokgo	부여초고 (扶餘肖古) 부여소고 (扶餘素古) 부여속고 (扶餘速古)	166–214	Chogo; Sogo; Sokgo	초고왕 (肖古王) 소고왕 (素古王) 속고왕 (速古王)
6		Buyeo Gusu; Buyeo Guisu	부여구수 (扶餘仇首) 부여귀수 (扶餘貴須)	214–234	Gusu; Guisu	구수왕 (仇首王) 귀수왕 (貴須王)
7		Buyeo Saban; Buyeo Sabi; Buyeo Sai	부여사반 (扶餘沙泮) 부여사비 (扶餘沙沸) 부여사이 (扶餘沙伊)	234	Saban; Sabi; Sai	사반왕 (沙泮王) 사비왕 (沙沸王) 사이왕 (沙伊王)
8		Buyeo Goi; Buyeo Gui; Buyeo Gomo	부여고이 (扶餘古爾) 부여구이 (扶餘久爾) 부여고모 (扶餘古慕)	234–286	Goi; Gui; Gomo	고이왕 (古爾王) 구이왕 (久爾王) 고모왕 (古慕王)
9		Buyeo Chaekgye; Buyeo Cheonggye	부여책계 (扶餘責稽) 부여청계 (扶餘靑稽)	286–298	Chaekgye; Cheonggye	책계왕 (責稽王) 청계왕 (靑稽王)
10		Buyeo Bunseo	부여분서 (扶餘汾西)	298–304	Bunseo	분서왕 (汾西王)
11		Buyeo Biryu	부여비류 (扶餘比流)	304–344	Biryu	비류왕 (比流王)
12		Buyeo Gye	부여계 (扶餘契)	344–346	Gye	계왕 (契王)
13		Buyeo Gu	부여구 (扶餘句)	346–375	Geunchogo; Chogo; Sokgo; Jogo	근초고왕 (近肖古王) 초고왕 (肖古王) 속고왕 (速古王) 조고왕 (照古王)
14		Buyeo Su	부여수 (扶餘須)	375–384	Geun-gusu; Geun-guisu; Guisu; Guiryu; Guso	근구수왕 (近仇首王) 근귀수왕 (近貴首王) 귀수왕 (貴首王) 귀류왕 (貴流王) 구소왕 (久素王)
15		Buyeo Chimnyu	부여침류 (扶餘枕流)	384–385	Chimnyu	침류왕 (枕流王)
16		Buyeo Jinsa; Buyeo Hwi	부여진사 (扶餘辰斯) 부여휘 (扶餘暉)	385–392	Jinsa	진사왕 (辰斯王)
17		Buyeo Asin; Buyeo Abang; Buyeo Ahwa; Buyeo Ami	부여아신 (扶餘阿莘) 부여아방 (扶餘阿芳) 부여아화 (扶餘阿花) 부여아미 (扶餘阿美)	392–405	Asin; Abang; Ahwa; Ami	아신왕 (阿莘王) 아방왕 (阿芳王) 아화왕 (阿花王) 아미왕 (阿美王)
18		Buyeo Yeong; Buyeo Jeon	부여영 (扶餘映) 부여전 (扶餘腆)	405–420	Jeonji; Jikji; Jinji	전지왕 (腆支王) 직지왕 (直支王) 진지왕 (眞支王)
19		Unknown	Unknown	420–427	Gu-isin	구이신왕 (久爾辛王)
20		Buyeo Biyu; Buyeo Bi	부여비유 (扶餘毗有) 부여비 (扶餘毗)	427–455	Biyu; Piryu	비유왕 (毗有王) 피류왕 (避流王)
21		Buyeo Gyeong; Buyeo Gyeongsa	부여경 (扶餘慶) 부여경사 (扶餘慶司)	455–475	Gaero; Geun-gaeru	개로왕 (蓋鹵王) 근개루왕 (近蓋婁王)
22		Buyeo Do; Buyeo Modo	부여도 (扶餘都) 부여모도 (扶餘牟都)	475–477	Munju	문주왕 (文周王)
23		Buyeo Samgeun; Buyeo Samgeol; Buyeo Imgeol	부여삼근 (扶餘三斤) 부여삼걸 (扶餘三乞) 부여임걸 (扶餘壬乞)	477–479	Samgeun; Mun-geun	삼근왕 (三斤王) 문근왕 (文斤王)
24		Buyeo Modae; Buyeo Dae; Buyeo Mamo; Buyeo Malda	부여모대 (扶餘牟大) 부여대 (扶餘大) 부여마모 (扶餘摩牟) 부여말다 (扶餘末多)	479–501	Dongseong; Malda	동성왕 (東城王) 말다왕 (末多王)
25		Buyeo Sama; Buyeo Yung	부여사마 (扶餘斯摩) 부여융 (扶餘隆)	501–523	Muryeong; Sama	무령왕 (武寧王) 사마왕 (斯摩王)
26		Buyeo Myeongnong; Buyeo Myeong	부여명농 (扶餘明禯) 부여명 (扶餘明)	523–554	Seong; Myeong; Seongmyeong	성왕 (聖王) 명왕 (明王) 성명왕 (聖明王)
27		Buyeo Chang	부여창 (扶餘昌)	554–598	Wideok; Chang	위덕왕 (威德王) 창왕 (昌王)
28		Buyeo Gye	부여계 (扶餘季)	598–599	Hye; Heon	혜왕 (惠王) 헌왕 (獻王)
29		Buyeo Seon; Buyeo Hyosun	부여선 (扶餘宣) 부여효순 (扶餘孝順)	599–600	Beop	법왕 (法王)
30		Buyeo Jang; Buyeo Seodong	부여장 (扶餘璋) 부여서동 (扶餘薯童)	600–641	Mu; Mugang; Mugwang	무왕 (武王) 무강왕 (武康王) 무광왕 (武廣王)
31		Buyeo Uija	부여의자 (扶餘義慈)	641–660	None	None
(32)		Buyeo Pung; Buyeo Pungjang	부여풍 (扶餘豊) 부여풍장 (扶餘豊璋)	660–663	None	None

== Silla ==
Silla (57 BC – 935 AD) was one of the Three Kingdoms of Korea. In the early years, Silla was ruled by the Pak, Seok, and Kim families. Rulers of Silla had various titles, including Isageum (이사금; 尼師今), Maripgan (마립간; 麻立干), and Daewang (대왕; 大王, "great king"). Like some Baekje kings, some declared themselves emperor.

1. Hyeokgeose Geoseogan 혁거세 거서간 赫居世居西干 (57 BC – 4 AD)
2. Namhae Chachaung 남해 차차웅 南解次次雄 (4–24)
3. Yuri Isageum 유리이사금 儒理尼師今 (24–57) (Kings Yuri to Heurhae bore the Korean title Isageum, an old word for "ruler")
4. Talhae Isageum 탈해이사금 脫解尼師今 (57–80)
5. Pasa Isageum 파사이사금 婆娑尼師今 (80–112)
6. Jima Isageum 지마이사금 祇摩尼師今 (112–134)
7. Ilseong Isageum 일성이사금 逸聖尼師今 (134–154)
8. Adalla Isageum 아달라이사금 阿達羅尼師今 (154–184)
9. Beolhyu Isageum 벌휴이사금 伐休尼師今 (184–196)
10. Naehae Isageum 내해이사금 奈解尼師今 (196–230)
11. Jobun Isageum 조분이사금 助賁尼師今 (230–247)
12. Cheomhae Isageum 첨해이사금 沾解尼師今 (247–261)
13. Michu Isageum 미추이사금 味鄒尼師今 (262–284)
14. Yurye Isageum 유례이사금 儒禮尼師今 (284–298)
15. Girim Isageum 기림이사금 基臨尼師今 (298–310)
16. Heulhae Isageum 흘해이사금 訖解尼師今 (310–356)
17. Naemul Maripgan 내물마립간 奈勿麻立干 (356–402) (Kings Naemul to Soji bore the Korean title Maripgan, an old word for "ruler")
18. Silseong Maripgan 실성마립간 實聖麻立干 (402–417)
19. Nulji Maripgan 눌지마립간 訥祇麻立干 (417–458)
20. Jabi Maripgan 자비마립간 慈悲麻立干 (458–479)
21. Soji Maripgan 소지마립간 炤知麻立干 (479–500)
22. King Jijeung 지증왕 智證王 (500–514) (Kings Jijeung to Gyeongsun bore the title Wang (the modern Korean word for "king"), with the exceptions noted below)
23. King Beopheung 법흥왕 法興王 (514–540)
24. King Jinheung 진흥왕 眞興王 (540–576)
25. King Jinji 진지왕 眞智王 (576–579)
26. King Jinpyeong 진평왕 眞平王 (579–632)
27. Queen Seondeok 선덕여왕 善德王 (632–647)
28. Queen Jindeok 진덕여왕 眞德王 (647–654)
29. King Taejong Muyeol 태종무열왕 太宗武烈王 (654–661)
30. King Munmu 문무왕 文武王 (661–681)
31. King Sinmun 신문왕 神文王 (681–692)
32. King Hyoso 효소왕 孝昭王 (692–702)
33. King Seongdeok 성덕왕 聖德王 (702–737)
34. King Hyoseong 효성왕 孝成王 (737–742)
35. King Gyeongdeok 경덕왕 景德王 (742–765)
36. King Hyegong 혜공왕 惠恭王 (765–780)
37. King Seondeok 선덕왕 宣德王 (780–785)
38. King Wonseong 원성왕 元聖王 (785–798)
39. King Soseong 소성왕 昭聖王 (798–800)
40. King Aejang 애장왕 哀莊王 (800–809)
41. King Heondeok 헌덕왕 憲德王 (809–826)
42. King Heungdeok 흥덕왕 興德王 (826–836)
43. King Huigang 희강왕 僖康王 (836–838)
44. King Minae 민애왕 閔哀王 (838–839)
45. King Sinmu 신무왕 神武王 (839)
46. King Munseong 문성왕 文聖王 (839–857)
47. King Heonan 헌안왕 憲安王 (857–861)
48. King Gyeongmun 경문왕 景文王 (861–875)
49. King Heongang 헌강왕 憲康王 (875–886)
50. King Jeonggang 정강왕 定康王 (886–887)
51. Queen Jinseong 진성여왕 眞聖王 (887–897)
52. King Hyogong 효공왕 孝恭王 (897–912)
53. King Sindeok 신덕왕 神德王 (912–917)
54. King Gyeongmyeong 경명왕 景明王 (917–924)
55. King Gyeongae 경애왕 景哀王 (924–927)
56. King Gyeongsun 경순왕 敬順王 (927–935)

== Gaya confederacy ==
The Gaya confederacy (42–562) consisted of several small statelets. All rulers of Gaya bore the title Wang (왕; 王, "king").

=== Geumgwan Gaya ===
Geumgwan Gaya (42–532) was one of the Gaya confederacy.

#	Portrait	Name		Period of reign
#	Portrait	Westernized	Hangul/Hanja	Period of reign
1		Suro	수로왕 (首露王)	42–199
2		Geodeung	거등왕 (居登王)	199–259
3		Mapum	마품왕 (麻品王)	259–291
4		Geojilmi	거질미왕 (居叱彌王)	291–346
5		Isipum	이시품왕 (伊尸品王)	346–407
6		Jwaji	좌지왕 (坐知王)	407–421
7		Chwihui	취희왕 (吹希王)	421–451
8		Jilji	질지왕 (銍知王)	451–492
9		Gyeomji	겸지왕 (鉗知王)	492–521
10		Guhyeong	구형왕 (仇衡王)	521–532

=== Daegaya ===
Daegaya (42–562) was one of the Gaya confederacy.

#	Portrait	Name		Period of reign
#	Portrait	Westernized	Hangul/Hanja	Period of reign
1		Ijinasi	이진아시왕 (伊珍阿豉王)	42 AD–?
	···	···	···	···
3 or 4		Geumnim	금림왕 (錦林王)	?–?
	···	···	···	···
Unknown		Haji	하지왕 (荷知王)	?–?
	···	···	···	···
6 or 7		Gasil	가실왕 (嘉悉王 or 嘉實王)	?–?
	···	···	···	···
9		Inoe	이뇌왕 (異腦王)	?–?
10 or 16		Wolgwang or Doseolji	월광태자 (月光太子) or 도설지왕 (道設智王)	?–562

== Tamna ==
Tamna (2337 BC(?)–938 AD) was an ancient local kingdom on Jeju Island.

== Balhae ==
Balhae (698–926) was an ancient Korean kingdom established after the fall of Goguryeo. Balhae occupied southern parts of Northeast China, Primorsky Krai, and the northern part of the Korean Peninsula.

#	Portrait	Personal name		Period of reign	Posthumous name (諡號)		Era name (年號)	
#	Portrait	Westernized	Hangul/Hanja	Period of reign	Westernized	Hangul/Hanja	Westernized	Hangul/Hanja
1		Dae Jo-yeong	대조영 (大祚榮)	698–719	Go	고왕 (高王)	None	None
2		Dae Mu-ye	대무예 (大武藝)	719–737	Mu	무왕 (武王)	Inan	인안 (仁安)
3		Dae Heum-mu	대흠무 (大欽茂)	737–793	Mun	문왕 (文王)	Daeheung; Boryeok	대흥 (大興) 보력 (寶曆)
4		Dae Won-ui	대원의 (大元義)	793	None	None	None	None
5		Dae Hwa-yeo	대화여 (大華璵)	793–794	Seong	성왕 (成王)	Jungheung	중흥 (中興)
6		Dae Sung-rin	대숭린 (大嵩璘)	794–809	Gang	강왕 (康王)	Jeongryeok	정력 (正曆)
7		Dae Won-yu	대원유 (大元瑜)	809–812	Jeong	정왕 (定王)	Yeongdeok	영덕 (永德)
8		Dae Eon-ui	대언의 (大言義)	812–817?	Hui	희왕 (僖王)	Jujak	주작 (朱雀)
9		Dae Myeong-chung	대명충 (大明忠)	817?–818?	Gan	간왕 (簡王)	Taesi	태시 (太始)
10		Dae In-su	대인수 (大仁秀)	818?–830	Seon	선왕 (宣王)	Geonheung	건흥 (建興)
11		Dae Ijin	대이진 (大彝震)	830–857	Unknown	Unknown	Hamhwa	함화 (咸和)
12		Dae Geonhwang	대건황 (大虔晃)	857–871	Unknown	Unknown	Unknown	Unknown
13		Dae Hyeonseok	대현석 (大玄錫)	871–895	Unknown	Unknown	Unknown	Unknown
14		Dae Wihae	대위해 (大瑋瑎)	895–906	None	None	Unknown	Unknown
15		Dae Inseon	대인선 (大諲譔)	906–926	None	None	Unknown	Unknown

== Later Baekje ==
Later Baekje (900–936) was founded by Kyŏn Hwŏn, who was a general during Later Silla's period of decline. Thus began the Later Three Kingdoms period. Later Baekje met its downfall at the hands of Kyŏn Hwŏn himself, who later led the Goryeo armies alongside Taejo of Goryeo to capture Kyŏn Sin-gŏm, who had betrayed his father, Kyŏn Hwŏn, and usurped the throne.

#	Portrait	Personal name		Period of reign
#	Portrait	Westernized	Hangul/Hanja	Period of reign
1		Kyŏn Hwŏn	견훤 (甄萱)	900–935
2		Kyŏn Sin-gŏm	견신검 (甄神劍)	935–936

== Later Goguryeo ==
Taebong (901–918), also known as Majin or Later Goguryeo, was established by Gung-ye, an outcast prince of Silla. Gung-Ye joined General Yang Gil's rebellion, and rose through the ranks. He eventually assassinated Yang-Gil and established a new kingdom, naming it Later Goguryeo. Gung-Ye turned out to be a tyrant, and was overthrown by his generals, opening the way for General Wang Geon, who established Goryeo.

#	Portrait	Personal name		Period of reign	Era name (年號)	
#	Portrait	Westernized	Hangul/Hanja	Period of reign	Westernized	Hangul/Hanja
1		Gung-ye	궁예 (弓裔)	901–918	Mutae; Seongchaek; Sudeok-Manse; Jeong-gae	무태 (武泰) 성책 (聖冊) 수덕만세 (水德萬歲) 정개 (政開)

== Goryeo ==
Goryeo (918–1392) was ruled by the Wang Dynasty. The first ruler had the temple name Taejo (태조; 太祖), which means "great progenitor", and was applied to the first kings of both Goryeo and Joseon, as they were also the founders of the Wang and Yi Dynasties respectively. Starting with Gwangjong, rulers of Goryeo styled themselves emperors, with the first three rulers elevated to that title posthumously. With the Mongol conquest, however, the title of the ruler was demoted to a king, or "Wang."

The next twenty-three kings (until Wonjong) are also referred to by their temple names, ending in jong (종; 宗). Beginning with Chungnyeol (the twenty-fifth king), all the remaining kings of Goryeo had the title Wang ("King") as part of their temple names. Era names are in bracket where available.

#	Portrait	Personal name		Period of reign	Courtesy name (C)/ Mongol name (M) / Pseudonym (Ps)		Temple name (廟號) (T) / Posthumous name (諡號) (P) / Posthumous name given by Mongols (MP)		Era name (年號)	
#	Portrait	Westernized	Hangul/Hanja	Period of reign	Westernized	Hangul/Hanja	Westernized	Hangul/Hanja	Westernized	Hangul/Hanja
1		Wang Geon	왕건 (王建)	918–943	Yakcheon (C)	약천 (若天, C)	Taejo (T); Sinseong (P)	태조 (太祖, T) 신성 (神聖, P)	Cheonsu	천수 (天授)
2		Wang Mu	왕무 (王武)	943–945	Sunggeon (C)	승건 (承乾, C)	Hyejong; Uigong (P)	혜종 (惠宗, T) 의공 (義恭, P)		
3		Wang Yo	왕요 (王堯)	945–949	Uicheon (C)	의천 (義天, C)	Jeongjong (T); Munmyeong (P)	정종 (定宗, T) 문명 (文明, P)		
4		Wang So	왕소 (王昭)	949–975	Ilhwa (C)	일화 (日華, C)	Gwangjong (T); Daesung (P)	광종 (光宗, T) 대성 (大成, P)	Gwangdeok; Junpung	광덕 (光德) 준풍 (峻豊)
5		Wang Ju	왕주 (王伷)	975–981	Jangmin (C)	장민 (長民, C)	Gyeongjong (T); Heonhwa (P)	경종 (景宗, T) 헌화 (獻和, P)		
6		Wang Chi	왕치 (王治)	981–997	On-go (C)	온고 (溫古, C)	Seongjong (T); Munui (P)	성종 (成宗, T) 문의 (文懿, P)		
7		Wang Song	왕송 (王訟)	997–1009	Hyosin (C)	효신 (孝伸, C)	Mokjong (T); Seonyang (P)	목종 (穆宗, T) 선양 (宣讓, P)		
8		Wang Sun	왕순 (王詢)	1009–1031	Anse (C)	안세 (安世, C)	Hyeonjong (T); Wonmun (P)	현종 (顯宗, T) 원문 (元文, P)		
9		Wang Heum	왕흠 (王欽)	1031–1034	Wonryang (C)	원량 (元良, C)	Deokjong (T); Gyeonggang (P)	덕종 (德宗, T) 경강 (敬康, P)		
10		Wang Hyeong	왕형 (王亨)	1034–1046	Sinjo (C)	신조 (申照, C)	Jeongjong (T); Yonghye (P)	정종 (靖宗, T) 용혜 (容惠, P)		
11		Wang Hwi	왕휘 (王徽)	1046–1083	Chok-yu (C)	촉유 (燭幽, C)	Munjong (T); Inhyo (P)	문종 (文宗, T) 인효 (仁孝, P)		
12		Wang Hun	왕훈 (王勳)	1083	Uigong (C)	의공 (義恭, C)	Sunjong (T); Seonhye (P)	순종 (順宗, T) 선혜 (宣惠, P)		
13		Wang Un	왕운 (王運)	1083–1094	Gyecheon (C)	계천 (繼天, C)	Seonjong (T); Sahyo (P)	선종 (宣宗, T) 사효 (思孝, P)		
14		Wang Uk	왕욱 (王昱)	1094–1095	None	None	Heonjong (T); Hoehyo (P)	헌종 (獻宗, T) 공상 (恭殤, P)		
15		Wang Ong	왕옹 (王顒)	1095–1105	Cheonsang (C)	천상 (天常, C)	Sukjong (T); Myeonghyo (P)	숙종 (肅宗, T) 명효 (明孝, P)		
16		Wang U	왕우 (王俁)	1105–1122	Semin (C)	세민 (世民, C)	Yejong (T); Munhyo (P)	예종 (睿宗, T) 문효 (文孝, P)		
17		Wang Hae	왕해 (王楷)	1122–1146	Inpyo (C)	인표 (仁表, C)	Injong (T); Gonghyo (P)	인종 (仁宗, T) 공효 (恭孝, P)		
18		Wang Hyeon	왕현 (王晛)	1146–1170	Ilsung (C)	일승 (日升, C)	Uijong (T); Janghyo (P)	의종 (毅宗, T) 장효 (莊孝, P)		
19		Wang Ho	왕호 (王晧)	1170–1197	Jidan (C)	지단 (之旦, C)	Myeongjong (T); Gwanghyo (P)	명종 (明宗, T) 광효 (光孝, P)		
20		Wang Tak	왕탁 (王晫)	1197–1204	Jihwa (C)	지화 (至華, C)	Sinjong (T); Jeonghyo (P)	신종 (神宗, T) 정효 (靖孝, P)		
21		Wang Yeong	왕영 (王韺)	1204–1211	Bulpi (C)	불피 (不陂, C)	Huijong (T); Seonghyo (P)	희종 (熙宗, T) 성효 (成孝, P)		
22		Wang O	왕오 (王祦)	1211–1213	Daehwa (C)	대화 (大華, C)	Gangjong (T); Wonhyo (P)	강종 (康宗, T) 원효 (元孝, P)		
23		Wang Cheol	왕철 (王皞)	1213–1259	Cheon-u (C)	천우 (天祐, C)	Gojong (T); Anhyo (P); Chungheon (MP)	고종 (高宗, T) 안효 (安孝, P) 충헌 (忠憲, MP)		
24		Wang Sik	왕식 (王禃)	1259–1274	Ilsin (C)	일신 (日新, C)	Wonjong (T); Sunhyo (P); Chunggyeong (MP)	원종 (元宗, T) 순효 (順孝, P) 충경 (忠敬, MP)		
25		Wang Geo	왕거 (王昛)	1274–1298; 1298–1308	None	None	Chungnyeol (MP); Gyeonghyo (P)	충렬 (忠烈, MP) 경효 (景孝, P)		
26		Wang Jang	왕장 (王璋)	1298; 1308–1313	Jungang (C); Iǰirbuka (M)	중앙 (仲昻, C) 익지례보화 (益知禮普花, M)	Chungseon (MP); Heonhyo (P)	충선 (忠宣, MP) 헌효 (憲孝, P)		
27		Wang Do	왕도 (王燾)	1313–1330; 1332–1339	Uihyo (C); Aratnašri (M)	의효 (宜孝, C) 아랄특눌실리 (阿剌忒訥失里, M)	Chungsuk (MP); Uihyo (P)	충숙 (忠肅, MP) 의효 (懿孝, P)		
28		Wang Jeong	왕정 (王禎)	1330–1332; 1339–1344	Buddhašri (M)	보탑실리 (寶塔實里, M)	Chunghye (MP); Heonhyo (P)	충혜 (忠惠, MP) 헌효 (獻孝, P)		
29		Wang Heun	왕흔 (王昕)	1344–1348	Padma dorji (M)	팔사마타아지 (八思麻朶兒只, M)	Chungmok (MP); Hyeonghyo (P)	충목 (忠穆, MP) 현효 (顯孝, P)		
30		Wang Jeo	왕저 (王㫝)	1348–1351	Čosgen dorji (M)	미사감타아지 (迷思監朶兒只, M)	Chungjeong (MP)	충정 (忠定, MP)		
31		Wang Jeon	왕전 (王顓)	1351–1374	Bayan Temür (M); Ijae / Ikdang (Ps)	백안첩목아 (伯顔帖木兒, M) 이재 / 익당 (Ps)	Gongmin (P); Gyeonghyo (P)	공민 (恭愍, P) 경효 (敬孝, P)		
32		Wang U	왕우 (王禑)	1374–1388	None	None	U	None		
33		Wang Chang	왕창 (王昌)	1388–1389	None	None	Chang	None		
34		Wang Yo	왕요 (王瑤)	1389–1392	None	None	Gongyang	공양 (恭讓, P)		

== Joseon ==
Joseon (1392–1910) followed Goryeo. In 1897, when Joseon became the Korean Empire, some of the Joseon kings were posthumously raised to the rank of emperors.

Joseon monarchs had temple names ending in jo (조; 祖) or jong (종; 宗). Jo was given to the first kings/emperors of new lines within the dynasty, with the first king/emperor having the special name of Taejo (태조; 太祖), which means "great progenitor" (see also Goryeo). Jong was given to all other kings/emperors.

Two kings, Yeonsangun and Gwanghaegun, were not given temple names after their deaths as they had been deposed.

Each monarch had a posthumous name that included either the title Daewang (대왕; 大王, "great king") or Hwangje (황제; 皇帝, "emperor").

#	Portrait	Personal name		Period of reign	Courtesy name (C) / Pseudonym (Ps)		Temple name (廟號) (T) / Posthumous name (諡號) (P)		Era name (年號)	
#	Portrait	Westernized	Hangul/Hanja	Period of reign	Westernized	Hangul/Hanja	Westernized	Hangul/Hanja	Westernized	Hangul/Hanja
1		Yi Seong-gye; Yi Dan	이성계 (李成桂) 이단 (李旦)	1392–1398	Junggyeol (C), Gunjin (C); Songheon (Ps), Songheongeosa (Ps)	중결 (仲潔, C), 군진 (君晋, C) 송헌 (松軒, Ps), 송헌거사 (松軒居士, Ps)	Taejo (T); Emperor Go (P)	태조 (太祖, T) 고황제 (高皇帝, P)		
2		Yi Bang-gwa; Yi Gyeong	이방과 (李芳果) 이경 (李曔)	1398–1400	Gwangwon (C)	광원 (光遠, C)	Jeongjong (T)	정종 (定宗, T)		
3		Yi Bang-won	이방원 (李芳遠)	1400–1418	Yudeok (C)	유덕 (遺德, C)	Taejong (T)	태종 (太宗, T)		
4		Yi Do	이도 (李祹)	1418–1450	Wonjeong (C)	원정 (元正, C)	Sejong (T)	세종 (世宗, T)		
5		Yi Hyang	이향 (李珦)	1450–1452	Hwiji (C)	휘지 (輝之, C)	Munjong (T)	문종 (文宗, T)		
6		Yi Hong-wi	이홍위 (李弘暐)	1452–1455	None	None	Danjong (T)	단종 (端宗, T)		
7		Yi Yu	이유 (李瑈)	1455–1468	Suji (C)	수지 (粹之, C)	Sejo (T)	세조 (世祖, T)		
8		Yi Hwang	이황 (李晄)	1468–1469	Myeongjo (C), Pyeongnam (C)	명조 (明照, C), 평남 (平南, C)	Yejong (T)	예종 (睿宗, T)		
9		Yi Hyeol	이혈 (李娎)	1469–1494	None	None	Seongjong (T)	성종 (成宗, T)		
10		Yi Yung	이융 (李㦕)	1494–1506	None	None	Yeonsangun	연산군 (燕山君)		
11		Yi Yeok	이역 (李懌)	1506–1544	Nakcheon (C)	낙천 (樂天, C)	Jungjong (T)	중종 (中宗, T)		
12		Yi Ho	이호 (李峼)	1544–1545	Cheonyun (C)	천윤 (天胤, C)	Injong (T)	인종 (仁宗, T)		
13		Yi Hwan	이환 (李峘)	1545–1567	Daeyang (C)	대양 (對陽, C)	Myeongjong (T)	명종 (明宗, T)		
14		Yi Gyun; Yi Yeon	이균 (李鈞) 이연 (李昖)	1567–1608	None	None	Seonjo (T)	선조 (宣祖, T)		
15		Yi Hon	이혼 (李琿)	1608–1623	None	None	Gwanghaegun	광해군 (光海君)		
16		Yi Jong	이종 (李倧)	1623–1649	Cheonyun (C), Hwabaek (C); Songchang (Ps)	천윤 (天胤, C), 화백 (和伯, C) 송창 (松窓, Ps)	Injo (T)	인조 (仁祖, T)		
17		Yi Ho	이호 (李淏)	1649–1659	Jeongyeon (C); Juk-o (Ps)	정연 (靜淵, C) 죽오(竹梧, Ps)	Hyojong (T)	효종 (孝宗, T)		
18		Yi Yeon	이연 (李棩)	1659–1674	Gyeongjik (C)	경직 (景直, C)	Hyeonjong (T)	현종 (顯宗, T)		
19		Yi Gwang; Yi Sun	이광 (李爌) 이순 (李焞)	1674–1720	Myeongbo (C)	명보 (明譜, C)	Sukjong (T)	숙종 (肅宗, T)		
20		Yi Yun	이윤 (李昀)	1720–1724	Hwiseo (C)	휘서 (輝瑞, C)	Gyeongjong (T)	경종 (景宗, T)		
21		Yi Geum	이금 (李昑)	1724–1776	Gwangsuk (C); Yangseongheon (Ps)	광숙 (光叔, C) 양성헌 (養性軒, Ps)	Yeongjo (T)	영조 (英祖, T)		
22		Yi San	이산 (李祘)	1776–1800	Hyeongun (C); Hongjae (Ps)	형운 (亨運, C) 홍재 (弘齋, Ps)	Jeongjo (T); Emperor Seon (P)	정조 (正祖, T) 선황제 (宣皇帝, P)		
23		Yi Hong	이홍 (李玜)	1800–1834	Gongbo (C); Sunjae (Ps)	공보(公寶, C) 순재 (純齋, Ps)	Sunjo (T); Emperor Suk (P)	순조 (純祖, T) 숙황제 (肅皇帝, P)		
24		Yi Hwan	이환 (李烉)	1834–1849	Muneung (C); Wonheon (Ps)	문응 (文應, C) 원헌 (元軒, Ps)	Heonjong (T); Emperor Seong (P)	헌종 (憲宗, T) 성황제 (成皇帝, P)		
25		Yi Won-beom; Yi Byeon	이원범 (李元範) 이변 (李昪)	1849–1864	Doseung (C); Daeyongjae (Ps)	도승 (道升, C) 대용재 (大勇齋, Ps)	Cheoljong (T); Emperor Jang (P)	철종 (哲宗, T) 장황제 (成章帝, P)		
26		Yi Jae-hwang; Yi Hui	이재황 (李載晃) 이희 (李㷩)	1864–1897 (1897–1907) *	Seongrim (C); Juyeon (Ps)	성림 (聖臨, C) 주연 (珠淵, Ps)	Gojong (T) * Emperor Tae (P) *	고종 (高宗) (T) * 태황제 (太皇帝) (P) *	Gaeguk; Geonyang; Gwangmu *	개국 (開國) 건양 (建陽) 광무 (光武) *

* see Korean Empire section

== Korean Empire ==
In 1897, Gojong proclaimed Joseon to be the Korean Empire, which lasted until 1910. Technically, the emperors can be referred to by their era names rather than their temple names, but the latter are commonly used.

#	Portrait	Personal name		Period of reign	Courtesy name (C) / Pseudonym (Ps)		Temple name (廟號) (T) / Posthumous name (諡號) (P)		Era name (年號)	
#	Portrait	Westernized	Hangul/Hanja	Period of reign	Westernized	Hangul/Hanja	Westernized	Hangul/Hanja	Westernized	Hangul/Hanja
1		Yi Jae-hwang; Yi Hui	이재황 (李載晃) 이희 (李㷩)	1897–1907	Seongrim (C); Juyeon (Ps)	성림 (聖臨, C) 주연 (珠淵, Ps)	Gojong (T); Emperor Tae (P)	고종 (高宗, T) 태황제 (太皇帝, P)	Gwangmu	광무 (光武)
2		Yi Cheok	이척 (李坧)	1907–1910	Gundang (C); Jeongheon (Ps)	군방 (君邦, C) 정헌 (正軒, Ps)	Sunjong (T); Emperor Hyo (P)	순종 (純宗, T) 효황제 (孝皇帝, P)	Yunghui	융희 (隆熙)

== See also ==
- Family tree of Korean monarchs
- Monarchs of Mahan confederacy
- Prime Minister of the Korean Empire (1895–1910)
- Resident-General of Korea, List of Japanese residents-general of Korea (1905–1910)
- Governor-General of Chōsen, List of Japanese governors-general of Korea (1910–1945)
- Provisional Government of the Republic of Korea, List of presidents (1919–1948)
- North Korea (1948–present), Supreme Leader (North Korean title) / List of heads of state of North Korea
- South Korea (1948–present), List of presidents of South Korea
