= Jeonggang of Silla =

50th monarch of Silla (r. 886–887)

Jeonggang

King of Silla
- Reign: 886-July 28, 887
- Coronation: 886
- Predecessor: Heongang of Silla
- Successor: Jinseong of Silla
- Born: Unknown; Unified Silla
- Died: 887; Unified Silla
- House: House of Kim
- Father: Gyeongmun of Silla
- Mother: Queen Munui
- Religion: Buddhism

Korean name
- Hangul: 김황
- Hanja: 金晃
- RR: Gim Hwang
- MR: Kim Hwang

Monarch name
- Hangul: 정강왕
- Hanja: 定康王
- RR: Jeonggangwang
- MR: Chŏnggangwang

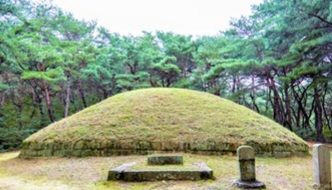
Royal Tomb of King Jeonggang of Silla

Jeonggang (Korean: 정강; Hanja: 定康; c.863 – July 28, 887), personal name Kim Hwang, was the 50th ruler of the Koreanic kingdom Silla. He was the son of King Gyeongmun; his siblings included his predecessor King Heongang and his successor Queen Jinseong.

Jeonggang rose to the throne when his brother Heongang died without an heir. Jeonggang died in turn less than two years later on July 28, 887. In his final year, he put down the rebellion of Kim Yo.

The tomb of King Jeonggang lies to the southeast of Borisa in Gyeongju.

== Family ==
Parents

- Father: Gyeongmun of Silla (841–875)
  - Grandfather: Kim Kye-myŏng
  - Grandmother: Madam Gwanghwa (광화부인)
- Mother: Queen Munui (문의왕후), daughter of King Heonan
  - Maternal grandfather: Heonan of Silla
  - Maternal grandmother: Unknown

== See also ==
- List of Korean monarchs
- List of Silla people
- Unified Silla

Jeonggang of Silla House of Kim Born: c. 863 Died: 887
Regnal titles
Preceded by Heongang	King of Silla; Silla; 886–887	Succeeded by Jinseong
