= Minae =

Minae may refer to:

- Mina (unit), ancient unit of mass
- Minaeans, the inhabitants of the kingdom of Ma'in in modern-day Yemen.

People:

- Minae of Silla (died 839), Silla ruler
- Minae Mizumura (水村 美苗) (born 1951), Japanese writer and literary critic
- Minae Noji (born 1973), Japanese-American actress

== See also ==
- Ministry of Environment, Energy and Telecommunications, government ministry of Costa Rica
