= T'aebong =

910–918 state in East Asia

Later Goguryeo
- 901–918
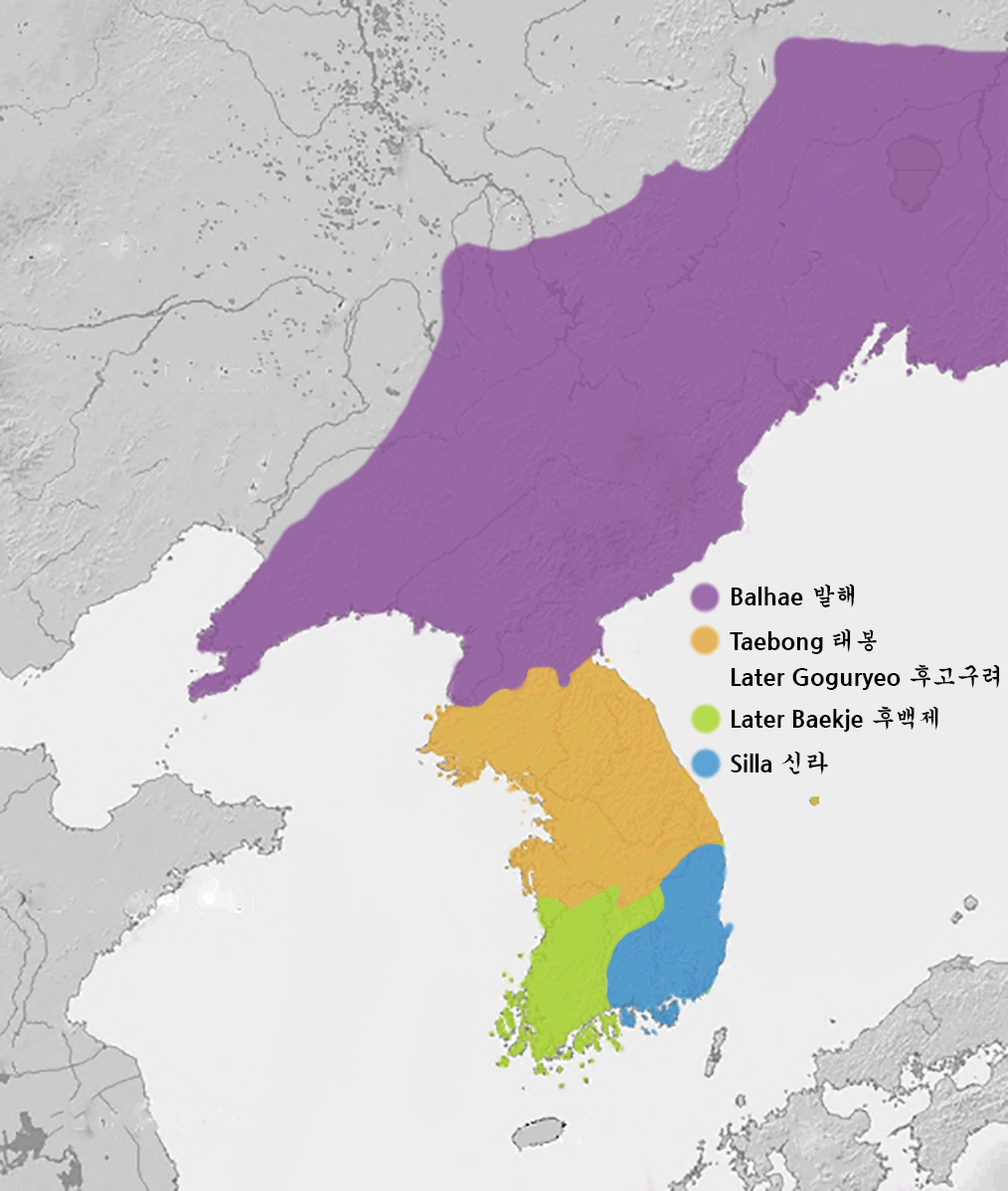
- T'aebong at its height in 915.
- Capital: Songak (901–905), Cheorwon (905–918)
- Common languages: Old Korean, Classical Chinese (literary)
- Religion: Buddhism (state religion), Confucianism, Taoism, Shamanism
- Government: Buddhist Theocratic monarchy
- King
  - 901–918: Kung Ye
- History
  - Establishment: 901
  - Fall: 918
Preceded by	Succeeded by
Unified Silla	Goryeo Dynasty
- Today part of: South Korea; North Korea

Korean name
- Hangul: 태봉
- Hanja: 泰封
- RR: Taebong
- MR: T'aebong
- IPA: [tʰɛ.boŋ]

Name from 901 to 904
- Hangul: 고려
- Hanja: 高麗
- RR: Goryeo
- MR: Koryŏ

Name from 904 to 911
- Hangul: 마진
- Hanja: 摩震
- RR: Majin
- MR: Majin

T'aebong (Korean: 태봉; Hanja: 泰封) was a state established by Kung Ye on the Korean Peninsula in 901 during the Later Three Kingdoms period.

== Name ==
The state's initial name was Goryeo, after the official name of Goguryeo, a previous state in Manchuria and the northern Korean Peninsula, from the 5th century. After a suggestion by Ajitae, Kung Ye changed the state's name to Majin (from maha jindan) in 904, and eventually to T'aebong in 911. When Wang Kon overthrew Kung Ye’s regime and founded the Goryeo dynasty, he restored its original name.

To distinguish Kung Ye's state from Wang Kon's state, later historians call this state Later Goguryeo (Hugoguryeo) or T'aebong, its final name.

== History ==
T'aebong was established with the support of the rebellious nobles of Goguryeo origin.

According to legend, Kung Ye was a son of either King Heonan or King Gyeongmun of Silla. A soothsayer prophesied that the newborn baby would bring disaster to Silla state, so the king ordered his servants to kill him. However, his nanny hid Kung Ye and raised him secretly. He joined Yang Kil's rebellion force in 892. Silla, after nearly a millennium as a centralized kingdom, was quickly declining, and Kung Ye instigated his own rebellion and absorbed Wang Kon's forces at Songak. In 898, He set up the capital in Songak. He eventually defeated Yang Kil and other local military lords and warlords in central Korea to proclaim himself king in 901.

Kung Ye transferred the capital from Songak to Cheorwon in 905. T'aebong at its peak consisted of territory in the present-day provinces of North and South Hwanghae, Gyeonggi, Gangwon/Kangwon, Pyongyang, North Chungcheong and the southern part of South Jeolla.

In his later days, Kung Ye proclaimed himself a Buddha and became a tyrant who sentenced death to anyone opposing him, including his own wife, Lady Gang. As a result, in 918 four of his own generals—Hong Yu, Pae Hyŏngyŏng, Sin Sunggyŏm and Pok Chigyŏm—overthrew T'aebong and installed Wang Kon as King Taejo.

Soon thereafter, Goryeo was established. T'aebong influenced Goryeo culturally. Kung Ye was originally a Buddhist monk. He encouraged Buddhism and changed the manners of national ceremonies Buddhist, including the Palgwanhoe (팔관회, 八關會) and Seokdeungnong (석등롱, 石燈籠, Stone lantern). These changes survived the death of Kung Ye and the fall of T'aebong.

== See also ==
- History of Korea
