= King Gyeongmun's ear tale =

Korean myth

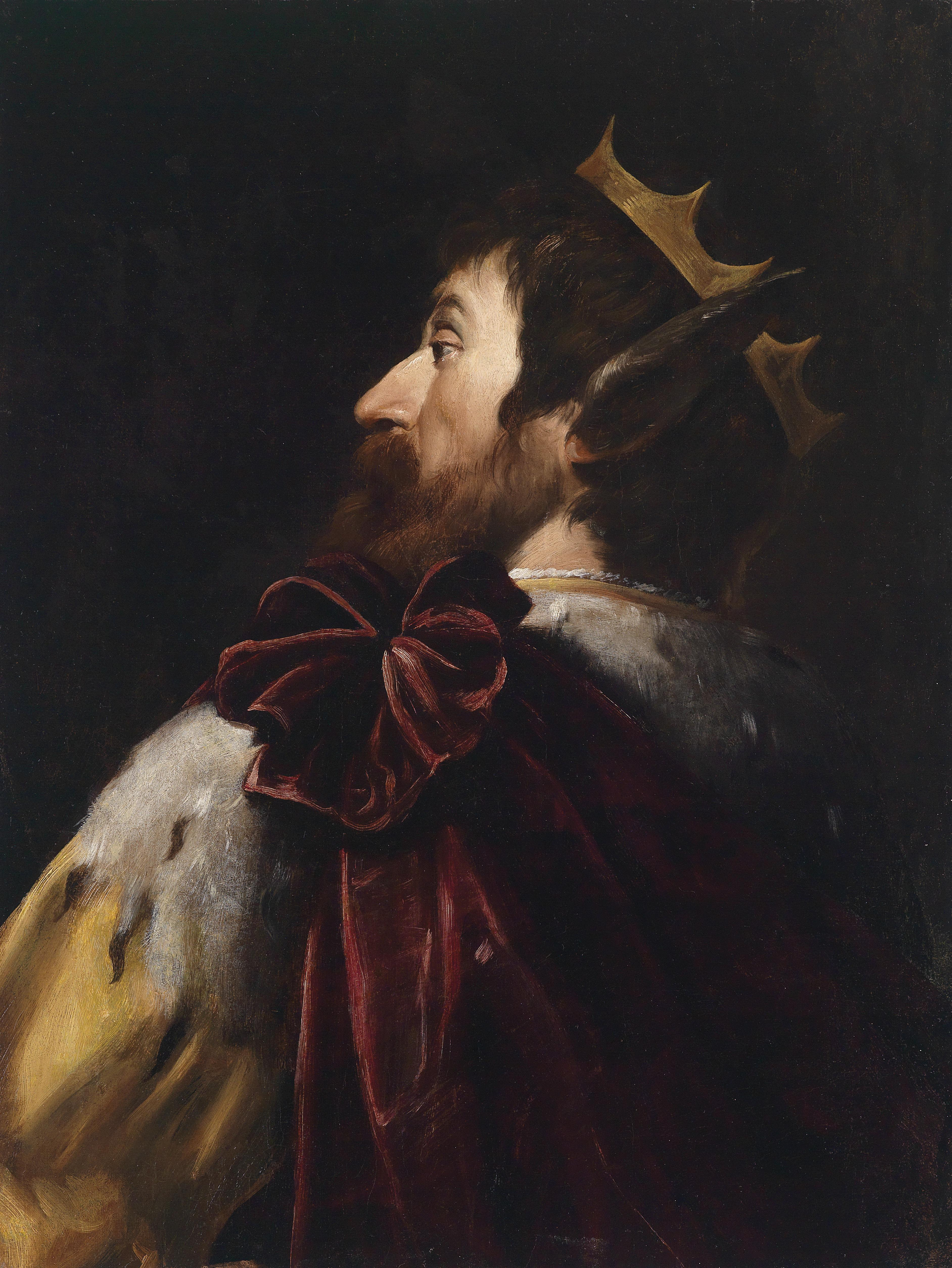
King Midas by Andrea Vaccaro

King Gyeongmun's ear tale is a tale about the ear of King Gyeongmun of Silla. "Samguk Yusa" tells two stories related to King Gyeongmun. One is that King Gyeongmun slept comfortably only when snakes stuck out their tongues and covered his chest whenever he slept, the other is that the king's ears are donkey ears.

== Plot ==
It is also called ‘the king’s ears are donkey ears’, ‘King Gyeongmun’s ears’, and ‘Yeoiseolhwa (여이설화, 驢耳說話)’.

This story is included in the part for the 48th Gyeongmun Daewang Dynasty of the "Samguk Yusa(三國遺事)" Volume 2, Records of Great Wonders Part 2 (권2 기이(紀異) 제2). This part has three stories: the story of 'The King with donkey ears', ‘Eungryeom (응렴, 膺廉) who became king with three good things’ and ‘the king who sleeps with snakes’. After King Gyeongmun ascended the throne, his ears suddenly grew longer and became like the ears of a donkey. No one knew about it. Even the empress and the court ladies didn't know about it. Only one, the king's 'bokdujangi' ( (幞頭장이), a person who used to make or repair bokdu worn by kings or government officials on their head, knew it. He did not dare to reveal the fact all his life, but when he died, he went into the bamboo grove of Dorimsa (도림사, 道林寺) which is a temple which used to exist in Gyeongju. Then he shouted at a bamboo tree, "Our king's ears are like donkey ears." After that, when the wind blew, a sound came from the bamboo field, saying, "Our king's ears are like donkey ears." The king did not like this, so he cut down the bamboo and planted cornus officinalis, but the sound was still the same.

== Analysis ==
It can be understood that it reflects the political burden of King Gyeongmun, who pursued the strengthening of royal authority while pacifying the resistance of the aristocrats, and the confused social image of uneasy public sentiment.

== Characteristics ==
This story has been widely orally handed down due to its rich folklore, and has been a subject of research by domestic and foreign scholars from an early age in that its distribution area is not only domestic but also global. Aarne-Thompson's Midas and the Ass's Ears basically consists of 'a man with donkey ears', 'a secret physical singularity discovered by a barber', 'a shamanic reed reveals a secret.'

The oldest record of this story is by Aristophanes, in Ovidius' Metamorphoses, which relates Midas, king of Phrygia in Asia Minor. Midas' ears are donkey ears which is the same as in Korea. However, it also appears as horse or goat ears in regions such as France, Romania, Russia, Greece, Ireland, and Chile.

On the other hand, it is a little different that our 'dresser (복두장이)' is 'barber' in the story of King Midas, and 'bamboo' is 'reed'. It has been confirmed that this tale exists not only in Korea but also in India, Mongolia, Turkey, Turkmenistan, and Kyrgyzstan, showing considerable differences in terms of content, but common in that the main characters all have donkey ears. Considering the geographical and political conditions, it is possible that this type of tale exists in China and Japan, but it has not yet been confirmed. A work that modernized this tale is 'Gwi' by Bang Gi-hwan, published in the November issue of Munhakyesul (문학예술, 文學藝術, Literature and Art) in 1957.

== See also ==
- Gyeongmun of Silla
- Samguk Yusa
- King Midas' Ears
