= The Goat's Ears of the Emperor Trojan =

South Slavic fairy tale

The Goat's Ears of the Emperor Trojan (Serbian: У цара Тројана козје уши / U cara Trojana kozje uši) is a Serbian fairy tale published by Serbian author Vuk Karadžić in 1870. Andrew Lang included it in The Violet Fairy Book. It was translated from a German version of Vuk Karadžić's Serbian Fairy Tales. The tale was also translated by John Naake as The Emperor Trojan's Goat's Ears and published in Slavonic Fairy Tales.

The incident appears as part of the legends of Midas in classical times, but not all of the legend appears in the fairy tale.

== Synopsis ==
The emperor Trojan had goat's ears, but kept this fact a secret from the populace. Every day, he had a new barber whom he would ask if he noticed anything strange; when the man answered that he had goat's ears, he was put to death. One day, an apprentice went, and said that he saw nothing strange, so he remained as the emperor's barber. The apprentice found his secret troubling him. His master advised him to tell him, the master, or his pastor, or to whisper it into a hole in the ground.

The apprentice dug a hole, whispered into it that the emperor had goat's ears, and filled it up again. An elder tree grew there, someone cut a branch and made a flute, but the only thing the flute would play was "The Emperor Trojan has goat's ears."

The news spread, and the emperor discovered it and wormed the secret out of the apprentice. He had the last branch cut and found the flute made from it was the same. He spared the apprentice's life but did not keep him on as his barber.

== Translations ==
Another translation of the tale indicated its origin as Serbia and titled it The Emperor Has Goat's Ears.

== Analysis ==
=== Tale type ===
The tale is classified in the Aarne-Thompson-Uther Index as type ATU 782, "Midas and the Donkey's Ears". The type is characterized by a figure of authority (e.g., a king) having strange physical traits (an animal's ears) which his personal servants take notice and lose their lives because of it. The talking reeds are responsible for revealing the king's shameful secret.

=== Predecessors ===
French scholar Marie-Louise Teneze pointed to a mediaeval and Celtic origin for the tale type.

The tale type also appears in Irish manuscripts of the 10th and 14th century, with horse-eared characters (namely, Labhraidh Loingseach and King Mark of Cornwall), but its legends are presumed to be much older.

=== Distribution ===
As cited by Zeljko Jovanovic, Croatian folklorist Maja Bošković-Stulli located variants from four continents, in "Korea, Tibet, India, Israel, Egypt, Russia, Bulgaria, Macedonia, Serbia, Croatia, Italy, Portugal, Ireland, Chile, Argentina, Cuba and the Dominican Republic". The ass's ears seem to be the more prevalent secret, but variants also exist with horse's ears, horse's head, or some animal horn.

According to Jurjen van der Kooi, variants of the tale type can be found in Southern and Southeastern Europe, North Africa and South America. In the Islamic cultural area, the kingly character is named Iskander and has two horns.

In the 19th century, German philologist Bernhard Schmidt noted that the story of Midas's ears could be found in Welsh, Irish and Breton sagas, as well as in Servia and in Mongolia.

Further studies show that variants of the tale type exist in Central Asia and India, as well as in an Ancient Korean written source (the Samguk yusa), about King Gyeongmun of Silla.

=== Variants ===
A Bulgarian variant was collected with the name "Царь Троян - Козлиные уши" ("Tsar Troyan - Goat's Ears").

Croatian folklorist Maja Bošković-Stulli noted that in Serbo-Croatian territory there exist "no homogeneous redaction", but many "local" versions of Midas's legend.
