= Kim Ye (rebel) =

- Hangul: 김예
- Hanja: 金銳
- RR: Gim Ye
- MR: Kim Ye

Kim Ye (Korean: 김예; Hanja: 金銳; died 868) was a member of the Silla royal House of Kim who plotted a failed rebellion against King Gyeongmun of Silla.

== Life ==
Kim Ye was a younger cousin of King Munseong. In 855, he participated in the construction of a stone pagoda at Ch'angnimsa Temple. At this time, he was the county magistrate of Giryang (modern-day Sinchang-myeon, Asan) and held the rank of saji (사지; 舍知). Even though he was a royal relative and a part of the chingol class, he only held the low ranks of county magistrate and saji.

By 868, Kim held the rank of ichan. Dissatisfied with the succession of the kingship of Silla, he and Kim Hyŏn (김현; 金鉉) plotted a rebellion against King Gyeongmun. The rebellion was unsuccessful and both he and Hyŏn were killed.
