= Kung Ye =

King of Taebong (c. 869–918)

Kung Ye 弓裔 궁예
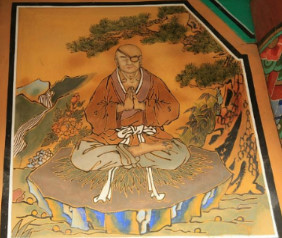
- Portrait of Kung Ye

King of Taebong
- Reign: July 901 – 24 July 918 (Note: In the Korean calendar (lunisolar), he reigned from July 901 until 14 June 918.)
- Coronation: July 901
- Predecessor: Dynasty established
- Successor: Dynasty abolished (Taejo of Goryeo as the first King of Goryeo)
- Regent: Ku Chin (905–906); Wang Kon (912–913)
- Born: c. 869
- Died: 24 July 918
- Spouse: Queen Kang
- Issue: Chong-gwang; Sin-gwang; Sun-baek
Era dates
- Mutae (무태, 武泰; 904); Seongchaek (성책, 聖冊; 905–910); Sudeokmanse (수덕만세, 水德萬歲; 911–914); Jeonggae (정개, 政開; 914–918)
- House: Silla (disputed)
- Father: Unknown, legend alleges Heonan of Silla or Gyeongmun of Silla
- Religion: Buddhism

Korean name
- Hangul: 궁예
- Hanja: 弓裔
- RR: Gung Ye
- MR: Kung Ye

Dharma name
- Hangul: 선종
- Hanja: 善宗
- RR: Seonjong
- MR: Sŏnjong

Other name
- Hangul: 미륵
- Hanja: 彌勒
- RR: Mireuk
- MR: Mirŭk

Kung Ye (Korean: 궁예; Hanja: 弓裔; c. 869 – 24 July 918) was the king of the short-lived state of Taebong (901–918), one of the Later Three Kingdoms of Korea. Kung Ye is alleged to have been a son of either King Heonan of Silla or Gyeongmun of Silla, though the accuracy of such a claim is not fully verifiable. He became a rebel leader against the unpopular Silla government, which almost abandoned the affairs of their subjects for the struggle for power among royal family members.

== Birth ==
The exact date of Kung Ye's birth is unknown, but records assume that he was a son of Heonan of Silla or King Gyeongmun; his mother is said to be a beloved lady of the court.

According to legend, Kung Ye was born on the traditional holiday of Dano. The royal seer prophesied that a baby born on Dano would bring disaster to the nation, and the court officials and royal family members urged to the king to get rid of the infant. So the king ordered his servants to kill him. However, when the troops rushed to the residence of Kung Ye's mother, she threw her baby from the second floor, with her maid hiding in nearby bushes to catch the baby. Although her plot tricked the soldiers, the maid had accidentally poked the left eye of the baby, causing Kung Ye to lose one eye. She hid Kung Ye and raised him secretly; when she died, Kung Ye became a Buddhist monk at Sedalsa (세달사), a Buddhist temple.

== Revolt ==
At the time, the monarch of Silla was Queen Jinseong (Kung Ye's half sister), who was the third female head of state in Korean history (the other three being: Queen Seondeok of Silla, Jindeok of Silla, and later President Park Geun-hye). Queen Jinseong was a powerless ruler and the government was largely corrupted by interventions of royal family members and rampant bribery among members of the royal court. The corrupt government continuously exploited the peasants and tenants, and after a year of famine, massively raised taxes in 889 which led to many revolts and rebellions. Local aristocrats, called hojok (호족; 豪族) emerged as de facto rulers of many provinces and regions, with the attention of government concentrated on suppression of rebellion and their own power struggles. Among the rebel leaders and local aristocrats, Ki Hwŏn and Yang Kil gained the most power.

Kung Ye first joined the troops of Ki Hwon in 891 but left shortly after as Ki Hwon did not fully trust him. Kung Ye joined Yang Kil's rebel group in 892, and became leading general of the rebel forces by defeating the local Silla army and other rebel groups. Most of the local aristocrats of Myeongju and Paeseo, including Wang Kŏn, submitted to his force, making him even more powerful than his master Yang Kil. Silla, after nearly a millennium as a centralized kingdom was quickly declining, and Kung Ye instigated his own rebellion in present-day Kaesŏng in 898. After turning against his master, Yang Kil, he eventually defeated and subjugated him and other local lords in central Korea to proclaim himself king of Later Goguryeo in 901 as the claimant successor state to the renowned former hegemon of Northeast Asia, Goguryeo. With his rival Kyŏn Hwŏn's Later Paekche taking control of the peninsula's southwest as the claimant successor state to the maritime empire of Paekche, he opened up the Later Three Kingdoms period of Korean History, a reference to the so-called Three Kingdoms period of Korea, several centuries earlier.

== Downfall ==
Kung Ye changed the country's name to Majin in 904, and moved the capital to Cheorwon in the following year. Since Cheorwon was a fortress located in a mountainous area, he moved people from the populous city of Cheongju and expanded his rule into the Chungcheong region, taking control of almost two-thirds of the land once controlled by Silla. In the same year Kung Ye took over Pyongyang and called for total destruction of the state of Silla.

Searching for a better way to unite his citizens, he wanted a more potent unifying theology. Therefore, around 905, he turned to religion. He decided what was needed to unite people under his power was religious faith, and using his previous occupation as a Buddhist monk, he referred to himself as Maitreya Buddha, who came to the world to guide and save the suffering people from all hardship. He changed the name of his kingdom to Taebong in 911.

In his later days, it is recorded that Kung Ye started to have paranoia. He claimed to have the supernatural ability to read minds, accusing many of his officials arbitrarily of treason and sentencing anyone who opposed him to death. He accused Consort Kang, one of his wives, of being unfaithful to him, and he killed her by shoving a heated, red-hot iron rod into her womb. Their two sons were executed. As a result, in 918 four of his own top generals – Hong Yu (홍유; 洪儒), Pae Hyŏn-gyŏng (배현경; 裵玄慶), Sin Sung-gyŏm and Pok Chigyŏm (복지겸; 卜智謙) – overthrew Kung Ye and enthroned Wang Kŏn, one of Kung Ye's followers and the previous chief minister, of his nation, as king. Kung Ye is said to have escaped the palace, but was killed shortly thereafter either by a soldier or by peasants who mistook him for a thief.

Soon thereafter, the Goryeo dynasty was proclaimed, and Wang Kŏn went on to defeat the rivaling Silla and Later Paekche to reunite the three kingdoms in 936.

== Alternative theory of origin ==
Some historians present a theory that states that Kung Ye was, in fact, a direct descendant of Ko Ansŭng, who had been the ruler of Goguryeo-Guk, which had been a failed Goguryeo revival state. Records of Silla reported that Ko Ansŭng was given the surname of the Silla royal family, "Kim." Therefore, Kung Ye's commonly known origin as a prince of Silla was right in a way, but Kung Ye being a son of a king of Silla may have not been true.

== Harem ==
- Wife: Queen Kang (강비, died 915)
  - Son: Kim Ch'ŏnggwang (김청광, died 915)
  - Son: Kim Singwang (김신광, died 915)
  - Son: Kim Sunbaek (김순백)

== Legacy ==
Even though Kung Ye was not able to keep his rule and achieve the reunification of the Korean peninsula under his rule, many scholars today are attempting to review the true character of Kung Ye. Historical records regarding Kung Ye are negative, since many historians during the Goryeo period tried to justify the coup by Wang Kŏn that dethroned Kung Ye, in order to give legitimacy to the dynasty. However, even after the founding of Goryeo, many people rejected the rule of Wang Kŏn and rebelled against the newly formed dynasty; some even voluntarily defected to Kyŏn Hwŏn's Later Paekche. It can be assumed that many people, even after the coup that crowned Wang Kŏn, favored the rule of Kung Ye and that he was not a total despot as described in history. Some scholars explain Kung Ye's self-proclamation as Buddha as an attempt to strengthen his power, since he, as a royal family member of Silla, had no influence over powerful local landlords and merchants, so he tried to use the power of religion in order to keep his rule, which did not prove to be effective.

== Popular culture ==
- Taejo Wang Geon (2000–2002): Portrayed by Kim Yeong-cheol and Maeng Se-chang.
- Thousand Days Unofficial History – Episode 73 (ko) (2018)
- Omniscient Reader (2018): He appears under the name of One-eyed Maitreya or Maitreya King.

== Notes ==
Kung Ye House of Kung Born: c. 869 Died: 918
Regnal titles
Preceded by none	King of Taebong; 901–918	Succeeded by Taejo as King of Goryeo
Titles in pretence
Preceded by none	— TITULAR — King of Goguryeo; Goguryeo claimant 901–918; Reason for succession failure: Overthrown by Taejo	Succeeded by Taejo as King of Goryeo
