= Kim Ye (multidisciplinary artist) =

Artist from Los Angeles, US

Kim Ye is a multidisciplinary artist based in Los Angeles. Her work has been shown at the Getty Center's Pacific Standard Time Family Festival, Moran Bondaroff, Machine Project, and Visitor Welcome Center. Ye's installations involve sculpture, painting, video, and live performance. Born in Beijing, she went on to receive her MFA from UCLA. In alignment with Ye's experience as a professional dominatrix, her work often explores dominant and submissive dynamics. This theme facilitates an ongoing mediation between artistic practice and BDSM culture.
