= Gyeongmun of Silla =

48th monarch of Silla (r. 861–875)

King Gyeongmun 경문왕 景文王

King of Silla
- Reign: 861–875
- Predecessor: Heonan of Silla
- Successor: Heongang of Silla
- Born: 846
- Died: 875; Silla
- Issue: Heongang of Silla; Jinseong of Silla; Jeonggang of Silla; Kung Ye (alleged)
- House: Kim
- Father: Kim Kye-myŏng
- Mother: Lady Gwanghwa

Korean name
- Hangul: 김응렴
- Hanja: 金膺廉, 金凝廉
- RR: Gim Eungryeom
- MR: Kim Ŭngnyŏm

Monarch name
- Hangul: 경문왕
- Hanja: 景文王
- RR: Gyeongmunwang
- MR: Kyŏngmunwang

Gyeongmun (846–875), personal name Kim Ŭngnyŏm, was the 48th ruler of the Koreanic kingdom Silla.

== Biography ==
King Gyeongmun was the grandson of King Huigang, and the son of the ichan Kim Kyemyŏng, who was also a director of the Chancellery (집사성 시중; 執事省侍中; chipsasŏng sijung). His mother was Lady Gwanghwa, the daughter of King Sinmu.

According to the Samguk yusa, when he was eighteen, he became a kukson of the hwarang. In 860, when he was 15 (according to the Samguk sagi) or 20 (according to the Samguk yusa), Gyeongmun impressed King Heonan at a banquet after making a report on his travels. King Heonan gave the young hwarang an opportunity to marry one of his two daughters. On the advice of a Buddhist monk who promised he would receive three auspicious things, Gyeongmun married Queen Munui, who was the less-attractive, elder daughter. The three auspicious benefits were that he would make King Heonan and his queen happy, that he would succeed King Heonan on the throne, and finally that he would also receive the younger daughter of King Heonan, as a consort.

Gyeongmun's reign saw intensifying internal strife and rebellion. In 866, ichan Yunhŭng (윤흥; 允興) and his brothers, Sukhŭng (숙흥; 叔興) and Kyehŭng (계흥; 季興) rebelled against Gyeongmun. Yunhŭng and his brothers supported the right of the descendants of Kim Kyun-jŏng (김균정; 金均貞) to the throne. Yunhŭng and his brothers were defeated and killed. In 868, ichan Kim Ye, the younger cousin of King Munseong and a descendant of Kim Kyun-jong, plotted rebellion along with Kim Hyŏn (김현; 金鉉) but they were caught and killed. Gyeongmun sought to strengthen the kingdom within and without, but was generally unsuccessful. Famine was widespread. In 869, he sent the Crown Prince (who would become King Heongang) to Tang China together with Kim Yun.

The Samguk yusa also portrays a story about King Gyeongmun which is similar to that of King Midas' ears. The Samguk yusa's mythical story claimed that King Gyeongmun had donkey-like ears, and only his crownmaker knew of the king's condition, as the king deliberately hid his ears from everyone. Unable to keep the secret, the king's crownmaker shouted the secret at a bamboo forest. Following the crownmaker's death, the king noticed that when the wind blows, his secrets echo from the forest. He immediately felt unpleasant and destroyed the bamboo forest and planted dogwoods.

His daughter, Jinseong, would later become Silla's 51 ruler and its 3rd and last reigning queen in 887.

== Family ==
1. Queen Munui of the Kim clan (문의왕후 김씨), eldest daughter of King Heonan
  1. Son: Heongang of Silla (c.861–886)
  2. Son: Jeonggang of Silla (c.863–887)
  3. Daughter: Jinseong of Silla
2. Secondary Consort Kim (차비 김씨; 次妃 金氏), second daughter of King Heonan

== In popular culture ==
- Portrayed by Lee Seung-Yong in the 2000–2002 KBS1 TV series Taejo Wang Geon

== See also ==
- King Gyeongmun's ear tale
- List of Korean monarchs
- List of Silla people
- Unified Silla

Gyeongmun of Silla House of Kim Born: 841 Died: 875
Regnal titles
Preceded by Heonan	King of Silla; Silla; 861–875	Succeeded by Heongang
