= Kim Kyemyŏng =

Korean royal family member (fl. 9th century)

- Hangul: 김계명
- Hanja: 金啓明
- RR: Gim Gyemyeong
- MR: Kim Kyemyŏng

Kim Kyemyŏng (Korean: 김계명; Hanja: 金啓明) was a member of the royal family of Silla. He was the son of King Huigang and the father of King Gyeongmun.

== Biography ==
Kim Kyemyŏng was the son of King Huigang and his wife, Queen Munmok, the sister of King Minae. He married Lady Ganghwa, the daughter of King Sinmu. His sons were King Gyeongmun and Kim Wi-hong. In 838, his father was murdered by Kim's maternal uncle, Kim Myŏng, who became the next king, King Minae.

By 848, Kim was of the panjinch'an rank. He succeeded Kim Yang as the director of the Chancellery (집사성 시중; 執事省侍中; chipsasŏng sijung). Kim Kyemyŏng was thought to have served as the director until his son, King Gyeongmun became king. Kim is thought to have died sometime before 866, as in 866 he was posthumously honoured as King Uigong (의공대왕; 懿恭大王) by his son.
