= Yang Kil =

Yang Kil (Korean: 양길; Hanja: 梁吉) was a head of rebel forces in Silla. Hugoguryeo King Kung Ye was once under his command. Historians are uncertain about his birth, death or family line. At the time, the monarch of Silla was Queen Jinseong. In 889, the state coffers of Silla were empty, so the queen sent envoys to the provinces to press her subjects into paying taxes. As a result, rebel forces began uprising all over the country, and Yang Kil was their major driving force, rising up in Bukwon (modern-day Wonju). The extent of Yang Kil's power is uncertain, but it is thought to have been considerable given the fact that Kung Ye was among his men. Yang Kil had the favor of Kung Ye, so Yang Kil entrusted him with all his work, gave him his soldiers and sent him on a military expedition eastward. According to the Samguk Sagi, Kung Ye's army's strength reached about 600 men, who are believed to have been soldiers given to him by Yang Kil. Once Kung Ye's power had increased, he left Yang Kil's army and founded Later Goguryeo. In retribution, Yang Kil tried to attack him, but failed. Little is known of Yang Kil's fate after this.
