= Huigang of Silla =

43rd monarch of Silla (r. 836–838)

King Huigang 희강왕 僖康王

King of Silla
- Reign: 836-838
- Predecessor: Heungdeok of Silla
- Successor: Minae of Silla
- Born: Unknown
- Died: 838; Silla
- House: House of Kim
- Father: Prince Hyechung
- Mother: Concubine Park

Korean name
- Hangul: 김제륭; 김제옹
- Hanja: 金悌隆; 金悌顒
- RR: Gim Jeryung; Gim Jeong
- MR: Kim Cheryung; Kim Cheong

Monarch name
- Hangul: 희강왕
- Hanja: 僖康王
- RR: Huigangwang
- MR: Hŭigangwang

Huigang (died 838; r. 836–838) was the 43rd ruler of the Korean kingdom of Silla. He was the grandson of King Wonseong and the son of ichan Kim Heon-jeong by Lady Podo. He married Lady Munmok, who was the daughter of daeachan Chunggong.

After the death of King Heungdeok in 836, Huigang and his uncle (Heungdeok's younger cousin) Kim Gyunjeong struggled for power. After Kim Myeong (who later became King Minae) killed Kim, Huigang rose to the throne.

Huigang made Kim Myeong his Sangdaedeung, but the next year Kim rebelled against him. Huigang killed himself, and was buried on the mountain Sosan in Gyeongju.

== Family ==
- Grandfather: Wonseong of Silla
- Grandmother: Queen Kim (Lady Yeonhwa)(숙정부인 김씨), of the Kim clan, the daughter of
- Father: Prince Hyechung (혜충태자; 750–791/792)
- Mother: Concubine Park (포도부인 박씨)
- Wife:
  - Queen Munmok (문목왕후 김씨), of the Kim clan, daughter of Kum Chung–gong (김충공)
    - Son: Kim Kye-myong
      - Daughter-in-law: Madam Gwanghwa (광화부인)
        - Grandson: Gyeongmun of Silla (841–875)

== See also ==
- Unified Silla
- List of Korean monarchs
- List of Silla people

Huigang of Silla House of Kim Died: 838
Regnal titles
Preceded by Heungdeok	King of Silla; Silla; 836–838	Succeeded by Minae
