= Heongang of Silla =

49th monarch of Silla (r. 875–886)

Heongang
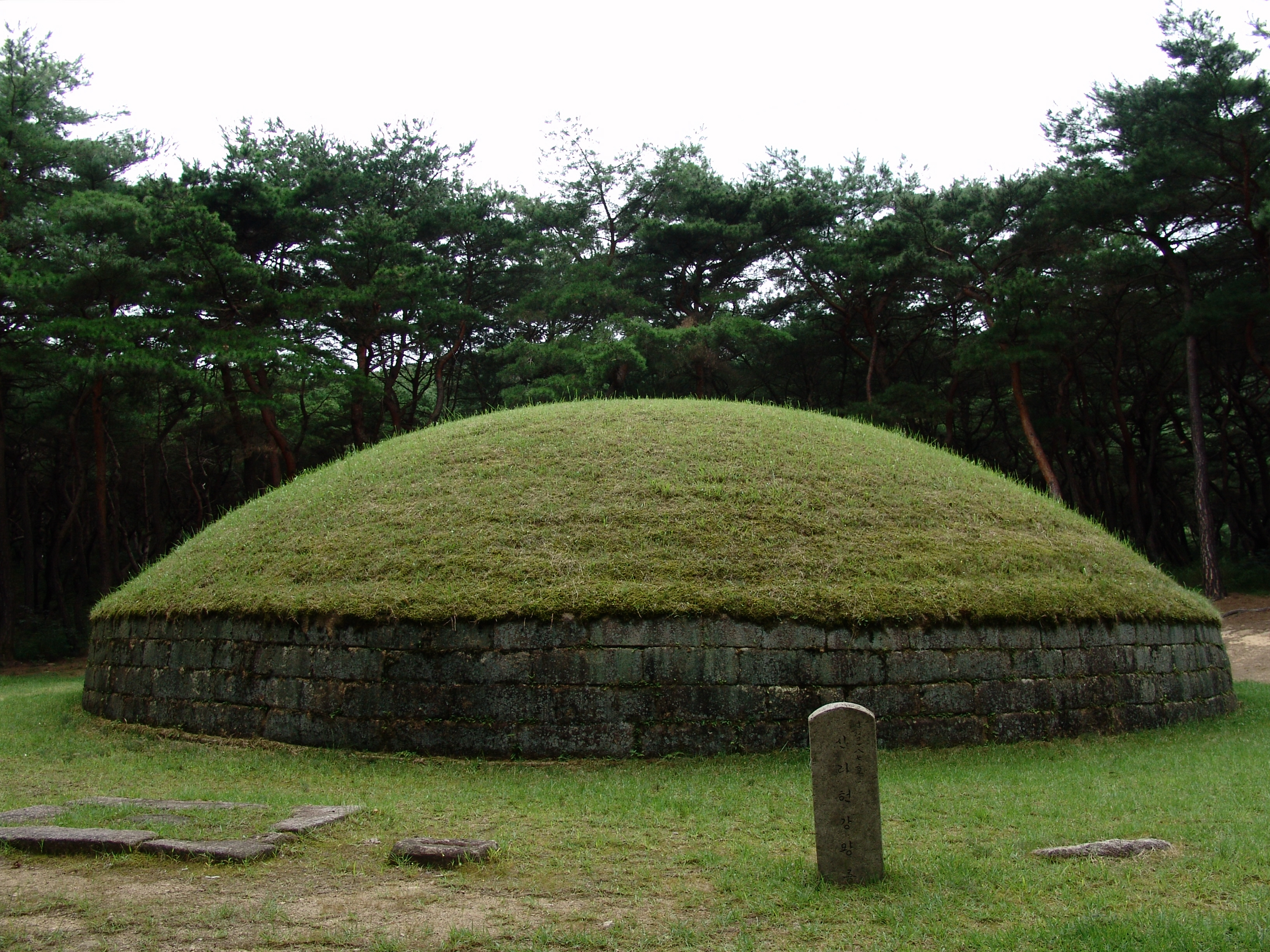
- Tomb of King Heongang in Gyeongju

King of Silla
- Reign: 875-886
- Coronation: 875
- Predecessor: Gyeongmun of Silla
- Successor: Jeonggang of Silla
- Born: 861; Unified Silla
- Died: 886; Unified Silla
- House: House of Kim
- Father: Gyeongmun of Silla
- Mother: Queen Munui
- Religion: Buddhism

Korean name
- Hangul: 김정
- Hanja: 金晸
- RR: Gim Jeong
- MR: Kim Chŏng

Monarch name
- Hangul: 헌강왕
- Hanja: 憲康王
- RR: Heongangwang
- MR: Hŏn'gangwang

Heongang (c.861–886), personal name Kim Chŏng, was the 49th to rule the Koreanic kingdom Silla.

According to the Samguk sagi, he excelled at civil affairs. Heongang was the eldest son of King Gyeongmun; his mother was Queen Munui. He had no legitimate heir, but did leave a son (later King Hyogong) by Lady Uimyeong.

In 879, Heongang was faced with the rebellion of a high official, his Ilgilchan Sin Hong. He is best remembered for the legends associated with him in the Samguk yusa, which claimed that a dancing dragon appeared before him and rewarded the king when he built a temple to pay homage to the dragon god. In 886, he sought to defuse domestic discontent with a decree of general forgiveness.

Heongang was buried to the northeast of Borisa temple in Gyeongju.

== Family ==
Parents

- Father: Gyeongmun of Silla
  - Grandfather: Kim Kye-myŏng
  - Grandmother: Madam Gwanghwa (광화부인)
- Mother: Queen Munui of the Kim clan (문의왕후 김씨)
  - Maternal grandfather: Heonan of Silla (헌안왕)
  - Maternal grandmother: Queen Anjeong of the Kim clan (안정왕후 김씨)

Consort and their respective issue:

- Queen Uimyeong (의명부인), of the Kim clan (의명왕후 김씨)
  - Daughter: Princess Uiseong (의성왕후 김씨) – became the Queen Consort of Sindeok of Silla
  - Daughter: Princess Gyea (계아태후) – married Kim Hyo-Jong (김효종) and became the Queen Mother of Gyeongsun of Silla
  - Son: Hyogong of Silla

== See also ==
- List of Korean monarchs
- List of Silla people
- Unified Silla

Heongang of Silla House of Kim Died: 886
Regnal titles
Preceded by Gyeongmun	King of Silla; Silla; 875–886	Succeeded by Jeonggang
