= Heonan of Silla =

47th monarch of Silla (r. 857–861)

King Heonan 헌안왕 憲安王

King of Silla
- Reign: 857–861
- Predecessor: Munseong of Silla
- Successor: Gyeongmun of Silla
- Born: Unknown
- Died: 861; Silla
- Issue: Kung Ye (allegedly)
- House: Kim
- Father: Kim Kyun-jŏng
- Mother: Madame Jomyeong

Korean name
- Hangul: 김의정; 김우정
- Hanja: 金誼靖; 金祐靖
- RR: Gim Uijeong; Gim Ujeong
- MR: Kim Ŭijŏng; Kim Ujŏng

Monarch name
- Hangul: 헌안왕
- Hanja: 憲安王
- RR: Heonanwang
- MR: Hŏnanwang

Heonan (died 861), personal name Kim Ŭijŏng, was the 47th king of the Silla kingdom of Korea. He was the younger half-brother of King Sinmu. What little we know of his reign comes from the Samguk sagi. The rebel leader Kung Ye is alleged to have been a son of either King Heonan or Gyeongmun, though the accuracy of such a claim is not fully verifiable.

Following a famine in the year 859, he sent relief to the peasants and supported agriculture through the construction of irrigation works.

Being without a son, Heonan chose his relative Kim Ŭng-nyŏm as his heir. After his death, Kim Ŭng-nyŏm took the throne, becoming King Gyeongmun. His tomb in Gyeongju was known as the Gongjakji (공작지/孔雀趾).

== Family ==
Parents

- Father: Prince Kim Kyun-jŏng (김균정), posthumously named King Chujong (추존 국왕)
  - Grandfather: Prince Ye–yŏng (예영)
- Mother: Madame Jomyeong ( 조명부인)

Consort and their respective issue:

- Wife: Queen Anjeong of the Kim clan (안정왕후 김씨)
  - Daughter: Queen Munui of the Kim clan (문의왕후 김씨)–married Gyeongmun of Silla
  - Daughter: Secondary Consort Kim (차비 김씨)–married Gyeongmun of Silla
  - Son (alleged): Kung Ye (it is unclear whether his father was King Heonan or King Gyeongmun)

== In popular culture ==
- Portrayed by Lee Geun-Woo in the 2000–2002 KBS1 TV series Taejo Wang Geon

== See also ==
- List of Korean monarchs
- Unified Silla
- History of Korea

Heonan of Silla House of Kim Died: 861
Regnal titles
Preceded by Munseong	King of Silla; Silla; 857–861	Succeeded by Gyeongmun
