= Sinmu of Silla =

45th monarch of Silla (r. 839)

King Sinmu 신무왕 神武王

King of Silla
- Reign: 839
- Predecessor: Minae of Silla
- Successor: Munseong of Silla
- Born: Unknown
- Died: 839; Silla
- Issue: Munseong of Silla
- House: House of Kim
- Father: Kim Gyun-jung
- Mother: Lady Park

- Sinmu of Silla
- Hangul: 김우징
- Hanja: 金祐徵
- RR: Gim Ujing
- MR: Kim Ujing

Monarch name
- Hangul: 신무왕
- Hanja: 神武王
- RR: Sinmuwang
- MR: Sinmuwang

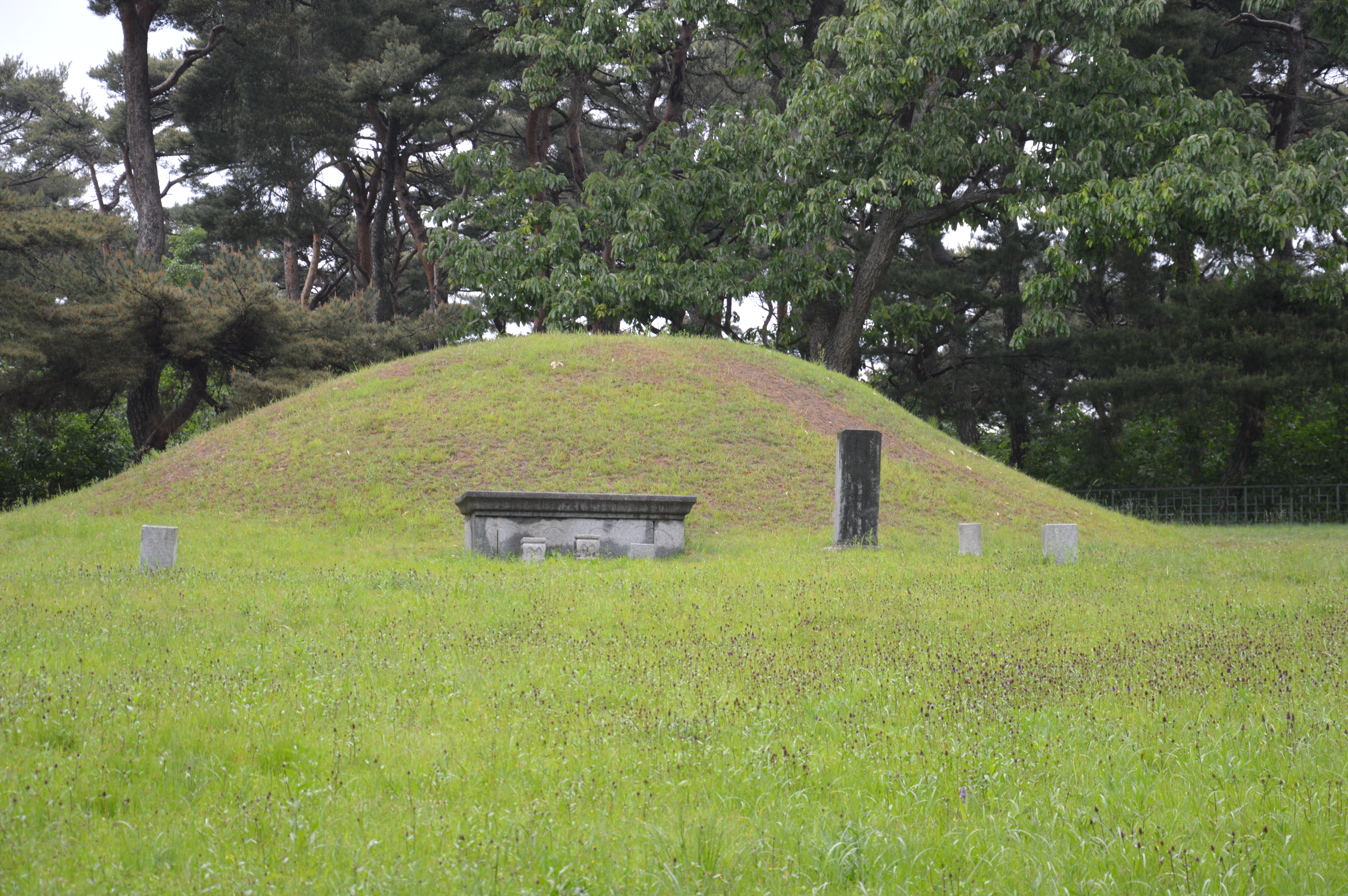
tumb of king Sinmu in Gyeongju, South Korea

Sinmu (died 839), personal name Kim U-jing, was the 45th monarch of the Korean kingdom of Silla. His reign was the briefest in the state's history, lasting only from the fourth to the seventh lunar month of 839.

Sinmu was the son of the Sangdaedeung Kim Gyunjeong (?–836), a descendant of King Wonseong (r. 785–798) and cousin to King Heungdok (r. 826–838). Upon the death of King Heungdok in 836 a succession struggle erupted between Kim Gyunjeong and his nephew, Kim Jeryung (?–838). Ujing and his follower, Kim Yang supported Gyunjeong, while Kim Myeong and Kim Rihong stood by Jeryung. Jeryung's party ultimately triumphed and Gyunjeong was killed. Kim Jeryung was then crowned as King Huigang in 836.

Yang escaped, but Ujing did not. Though being pardoned promptly by the new king, he soon became threatened by Myeong who became Sangdaedeung. So in 837, Ujing fled and entrusted himself with Chang Pogo in Cheonghaejin. However, a year later, Myeong fomented a revolt against King Huigang which killed several of the King's aides. Faced with defeat, King Huigang committed suicide. Kim Myeong then ascended the throne as King Minae. Kim Yang, who was then concealing himself on a mountain near the capital, heard the news and raised up an army to go to Cheonghaejin. He told Ujing of these events and persuaded him to have his revenge. Ujing asked Chang Pogo to help him to take advantage of the confusion of the country and to make himself a king. Chang Pogo agreed and had his friend Jeong Nyeon also follow Ujing. In 839, Ujing and his followers defeated King Minae's army at the battle of Daegu and quickly advanced upon the capital. All the king's aides then ran away leaving the king behind, so the king hid himself in a villa near the royal palace. Soldiers came into the palace and searched for the king. Finally, they found the king in the villa and killed him in spite of his pleas. Kim Rihong was also killed. Ujing then placed himself on the throne as King Sinmu.

He died three months later from disease and was buried on Mt. Jehyeong in the Silla capital of Gyeongju. It is also said that Sinmu dreamed of seeing the dead Rihong shooting an arrow into him. Sinmu awoke with a start when the arrow hit him, but the wound remained real, becoming worse and worse, finally leading to his death.

Sinmu's third son, Kim Heung-Gwang, became the founder of the Gwangsan Kim clan.

== Family ==
Parents

- Father: Kim Kyun-jŏng (김균정; 金均貞), posthumously named King Chujong (추존 국왕)
  - Grandfather: Prince Hyechung (혜충태자; 750–791/792)
  - Grandmother: Queen Seongmok, of the Kim clan (성목태후 김씨)
- Mother: Lady Pak, of the Pak clan (정교부인 박씨), posthumously named Queen Heonmok (정교부인 박씨)

Consorts and their respective issue:

- Queen Jeonggye (정계부인)
  - Son: Munseong of Silla (died 857) (문성왕) –was the 46th ruler of the Korean kingdom of Silla

== In popular culture ==
- Portrayed by Kil Yong-Woo in the 2004 KBS2 TV series Emperor of the Sea

== See also ==
- List of Korean monarchs
- List of Silla people
- Unified Silla

Sinmu of Silla House of Kim Died: 839
Regnal titles
Preceded by Minae	King of Silla; Silla; 839	Succeeded by Munseong
