= Minae of Silla =

44th monarch of Silla (r. 838–839)

King Minae 민애왕 閔哀王

King of Silla
- Reign: 838-839
- Predecessor: Huigang of Silla
- Successor: Sinmu of Silla
- Born: 817
- Died: 839; Silla
- House: House of Kim
- Father: Kim Chung-gong
- Mother: Lady Gwibo

- Minae of Silla
- Hangul: 김명
- Hanja: 金明
- RR: Gim Myeong
- MR: Kim Myŏng

Monarch name
- Hangul: 민애왕
- Hanja: 閔哀王
- RR: Minaewang
- MR: Minaewang

Minae (c. 817–839) (r. 838–839) was the 44th ruler of the Korean kingdom of Silla. He was a great-grandson of King Wonseong, and the son of Daeachan Kim Chung-gong. His mother was a Kim, Lady Gwibo. He married the daughter of Gakgan Kim Yeong-gong.

Being of true bone rank, Minae rose to the rank of sangdaedeung. He then schemed with Kim Rihong and others to overthrow King Huigang. They threatened the King and drove him to kill himself, which began to destabilize Silla, as Minae had defied the traditional hierarchy of the royal family of Silla and destroyed its legitimacy. In the following year, Kim Ujing allied himself with Chang Pogo, who sent his forces into the capital (Gyeongju) to topple and slay the king. King Minae attempted to defeat the rebels but his generals were all defeated. Minae died at the soldiers' hands in the twelfth lunar month, early in 839.

== Family ==
Parents

- Father: Kim Chung-gong (김충공)
  - Grandfather: Prince Hyechung (혜충태자; 750–791/792)
  - Grandmother: Queen Seongmok, of the Kim clan ( 성목태후 김씨)
- Mother: Lady Gwibo (귀보부인 김씨), of the Kim clan

Consorts and their respective issue:

- Queen Yunyong, of the Kim clan (윤용왕후 김씨)

== See also ==
- List of Korean monarchs
- List of Silla people
- Unified Silla

Minae of Silla House of Kim Born: 817 Died: 839
Regnal titles
Preceded by Huigang	King of Silla; Silla; 838–839	Succeeded by Sinmu
