= List of Silla people =

This is a partial list of people who lived in Silla, 57 BCE (traditional date) - 935 CE.

== A ==
- Adalla, eighth ruler of Silla (r. 154-184).
- Ajagae, 9th-century rebel leader.

== B ==
- Bak Hyeokgeose, legendary founder of the Silla kingdom.
- Beolhyu, ninth ruler of Silla (r. 184–196).
- Bidam, 7th-century rebel leader.

== C ==
- Chang Pogo, merchant and maritime commissioner of Cheonghaejin
- Cheomhae, twelfth ruler of Silla (r. 247–261).
- Cheonmyeong, 7th-century princess of Silla.
- Ch'oe Ch'i-wŏn, 9th-century philosopher.
- Crown Prince Maui, Crown Prince of the 56 King Gyeongsun of Silla.

== D ==
- Deokman, birth name of Queen Seondeok.

== G ==
- Girim Isageum, fifteenth ruler of Silla (r. 298–310).

== H ==
- Heulhae, sixteenth ruler of Silla (r. 310–356).
- Hyecho, 8th-century monk and traveller.
- Hyogong of Silla, the 52nd ruler of the Korean kingdom of Silla.
- Hyegong of Silla, the 36th ruler of the Korean kingdom of Silla.

== I ==
- Ichadon, 6th-century monk and martyr.
- Ilseong, seventh ruler of Silla (r. 134-154).

== J ==
- Jima, sixth ruler of Silla (r. 112-134)
- Jindeok, 28th ruler of Silla and second reigning queen.
- Jinji of Silla, 25th ruler of Silla
- Jinheung of Silla, 24th ruler of Silla, responsible for the immense expansion of Silla territory
- Jinpyo, eighth-century monk.
- Jobun, eleventh ruler of Silla (r. 230-247).
- Jinpyeong of Silla, 26th ruler of Silla (r. 597-632)

== K ==
- Kim Alcheon, seventh-century chief of the royal palace guard and bodyguard to Queen Seondeok.
- Kim Taemun, eighth-century historian.
- Kim Hŏnch'ang, ninth-century rebel leader.
- Kim In-mun, seventh-century aristocrat.
- Mu-ryeok Kim, Silla general.
- Kim Yang, ninth-century Silla viceroy.
- Kim Yushin, Silla's greatest general.
- Kim Chunchu / King Muyeol, 29th ruler of Silla
- Kyŏn Hwŏn, rebel leader who went on to found Later Baekje.

== M ==
- Michu, thirteenth ruler of Silla (r. 262–284).

== N ==
- Naehae, tenth ruler of Silla (r. 196–230).
- Naemul Maripgan, seventeenth ruler of Silla (r. 356–402).
- Namhae, second ruler of Silla.

== P ==
- Pasa, fifth ruler of Silla.

== S ==
- Seol Chong, 8th-century scholar and son of Choe Chi-won.
- Queen Seondeok, twenty-seventh ruler and first reigning queen of Silla (r. 632-647).

== T ==
- Talhae, fourth ruler of Silla (r. 57-80).

== U ==
- Uisang, 7th-century monk and friend of Wonhyo.

== W ==
- Wang Kŏn, general who went on to found Goryeo.
- Woncheuk, 7th-century monk who spent much of his career in Tang China.
- Wonhyo, eminent 7th-century monk and scholar.

== Y ==
- Yi Alpyeong, village chief of ancient Silla.
- Yi Sabu, 6th-century general.
- Yuri Isageum, third ruler of Silla (r. 24-57).
- Yurye Isageum, fourteenth ruler of Silla (r. 284–298).

== See also ==
- Silla
- List of Baekje people
- List of Goguryeo people
- List of Goryeo people
- List of Joseon Dynasty people
