= Gyeongju Seok clan =

Korean clan from Gyeongju, South Korea

Wolseong Seok clan 월성 석씨 Gyeongju Seok clan (경주 석씨)
- Country: Korea
- Current region: Wolseong-dong, Gyeongju-si, Gyeongsangbuk-do
- Origin: Gyeongju City, North Gyeongsang Province, South Korea
- Founder: Talhae Isageum of Silla
- Members: 11,355 peoples (as of 2015 research)
- Connected members: Seok Beol-hyu; Seok Nae-hae; Seok Jo-bun; Seok Cheom-hae; Seok Yu-rye; Seok Gi-rim; Seok U-ro; Seok Heul-hae

- Gyeongju Seok clan
- Hangul: 월성 석씨
- Hanja: 月城 昔氏
- RR: Wolseong Seokssi
- MR: Wŏlsŏng Sŏkssi

The Wolseong Seok clan (Korean: 월성 석씨; Hanja: 月城 昔氏), also known as the Gyeongju Seok clan (Korean: 경주 석씨; Hanja: 慶州 昔氏) is a Korean clan. Their Bon-gwan is in Gyeongju, North Gyeongsang Province. It was founded by Seok Jae-heung (昔載興), a descendant of Seok Tal-hae the 4th monarch of the korean ancient kingdom of Silla. The Seok clan was one of the three clans that shared and ruled the Silla throne during its early period.

== See also ==
- Seok (Korean name)
