= Soji of Silla =

King of Silla from 479 to 500

King Soji 소지 마립간 炤知麻立干
- Maripgan

Ruler of Silla
- Reign: 479–500
- Coronation: 479
- Predecessor: Jabi of Silla
- Successor: Jijeung of Silla
- Born: Unknown
- Died: 500; Silla
Posthumous name
- King Soji (소지 마립간; 炤知麻立干)
- Father: Jabi of Silla
- Mother: Lady Kim

- Soji of Silla
- Hangul: 소지 마립간
- Hanja: 炤知麻立干
- RR: Soji maripgan
- MR: Soji maripkan

Soji was the 21st king of Silla (died 500, r. 479–500). He was preceded by Jabi Maripgan (458–479) and succeeded by King Jijeung (500–514). According to the Samguk sagi, there was significant development of road infrastructure during his reign.

He is one of the candidates for the owner of the Gold Crown Tomb located in Gyeongju, ascribed as 'King Isaji (尒斯智王)'.

== Reign ==
According to the Samguk sagi he was a filial child and was a humble adult. Just like his father, he had to fight off the Wa and Goguryeo, and he continued the alliance with Baekje, and built a new alliance with Gaya.

In 480, the Mohe people attacked from the north, and the following year, with the help of Goguryeo they seized seven fortresses. Soji managed to drive them back with the help of his allies. Goguryeo kept trying in subsequent years but Silla managed to keep them at bay, with the help of Baekje. Silla was also attacked numerous times by the Wa. In 493, to further strengthen their alliance, Dongseong of Baekje married the daughter of Silla royal Biji (비지).

He was remembered as a benevolent king, who personally visited war zones and areas of natural disasters to encourage his people and persuade them to go back to farming. In 490, he created the first official marketplace in the capital to foster commerce.

According to the Samguk sagi, a few months before his death, he met a beautiful 16 year old girl named Byeoghwa in the countryside, fell in love with her and brought her to the palace. She is said to have given birth to a son later. However, Soji died without a legitimate male heir, thus the throne went to Jijeung, the great-grandson of King Naemul.

== Family ==
- Grandfather: King Nulji of Silla
- Grandmother: Lady Aro, of the Kim clan (아로부인 김씨), daughter of King Silseong
- Father: Jabi of Silla
- Mother: Lady Kim, of the Kim clan (왕후김씨), daughter of Kim Misaheun (김미사흔)
- Wife:
  - Lady Seonhye (선혜부인), of the Kim clan (왕후김씨), daughter of Galmunwang Seupbo and Lady Josaeng
    - Daughter: Princess Bodo (보도부인), wife of Boepheung of Silla
  - Lady Yeonje, of the Park clan (연제부인 박씨)
    - Son: Prince Sanjong (산종)
  - Lady Byeoghwa (벽화부인), of the Park clan (박씨), daughter of Park Paro (박파로)
    - Son: Kim Isabu (이사부)–was a military general and politician of Silla

== See also ==
- Three Kingdoms of Korea
- List of Korean monarchs
- List of Silla people

Soji of Silla House of Kim Died: 500
Regnal titles
Preceded by Jabi	Ruler of Silla; 479–500	Succeeded by Jijeung
