= Hogong =

Silla scholar-bureaucrat (fl. 1st century)

- Hangul: 호공
- Hanja: 瓠公
- RR: Hogong
- MR: Hogong

Hogong (瓠公, 호공) was a minister of Silla in the age of nation-building. It is recorded that he was originally from the Wa people of Japan, though his family name or clan name was unknown to the compiler of the Samguk sagi.

== History ==
It is said that Hogong came from the kingdom of Wa, present-day Japan. It is unknown when he exactly arrived in Silla or his time of death. However, he is considered one of the most important Japanese individuals in Korean history alongside Talhae of Silla.

According to the Samguk sagi, Hogong resided in Pyoambong (瓢巖峯, 표암봉) of Yangsan. It is later said that Hogong's home was stolen by Talhae prior to him becoming king, as he deemed it as a great place of residence. Hogong's home became the foundation to Wolseong, a Silla period palace built by Pasa of Silla, the successor of Talhae who stole Hogong's home.

According to stories found within the clans of Korea, Hogong appears as an important individual. In the story of Kim Al-chi, it is said that In the year 65 (9th year of King Talhae's reign), Talhae heard a rooster crowing in Sirim, west of Geumseong (present-day Gyeongju, the capital of Silla). He sent Hogong to investigate whereupon he found a golden box hanging on a branch. Inside the box was the infant Kim Al-chi. Kim later became the founder of the Gyeongju Kim clan. He was also the personal minister to King Talhae, the fourth king of Silla and the founder of the Gyeongju Seok clan.

It is unclear as to what happened to Hogong after the stories. However, it is speculated that he died in Silla.

== Name ==
He was called "Hogong" (meaning Duke Gourd) because he was wearing one or more bottle gourds on his waist when he first came across the sea. He was a very important person in initial Silla because he appeared in stories of primogenitors of all royal families. In fact, the Sino-Korean "瓠, ho" meaning 'gourd' is a synonym of native Korean "박, bak". The "gong" in his name was most likely a title, as the Sino-Korean "公, gong" is from the Chinese character "公, gōng" meaning 'duke; husband; male; public, communal; fair, equitable.', ultimately making Hogong's name mean "Duke gourd".

== Identity ==
=== Hyeokgeose theory ===
Scholars such as Kim So-un (김소운), a pro-Japanese Korean historian, posited that Hyeokgeose was Hogong, a Japanese individual who was Hyeokgeose's personal minister, based on the fact that the characters for "Park (朴)" and Hogong's surname "Ho (瓠)" all shared the meaning of "gourd".

However, this theory is considered unlikely as the sources claim that both individuals existed concurrently and provide accounts of the two interacting with one another.

=== Al-pyeong theory ===
Another theory suggests that Al-pyeong (謁平, 알평), one of the village leaders that became the foundation for Silla and the founder of the Gyeongju Lee clan (the second largest Lee clan in Korea), was none other than Hogong. It postulates that Al-pyeong's real name, "Pyoam (瓢巖, 표암)" which has the word "pyo (瓢, 표)" a character that means 'calabash' (a species of gourd), was represented as "Pyogong (瓢公, 표공)" meaning "Duke Pyo (calabash)" during his time as the leader of his village. By comparing the similarities of their names, "Hogong–Pyogong" and both individuals having a character that meant 'gourd/calabash', it is theorized that Al-pyeong, the founder of the Gyeongju Lee clan, was in fact Hogong.

It is also noted that Hogong's residence was the same locale as Al-pyeong's place of origin. It is said that Pyoambong of Yangsan was named after Pyoam (Al-pyeong)'s descent from the heavens. Pyoambong, under Yangsan, was one of the six villages/clans of Jinhan that became the foundation of Silla.

In addition, both Hogong and Pyogong (Al-pyeong) were crucial individuals that helped Hyeokgeose found the kingdom of Silla. They were also people who were active in similar time periods (spanning from the foundation of Silla to its earliest kings) and acted as the kings' personal ministers.

Their similarity in names (ho, 瓠–pyo, 瓢), their titles (gong, 公), place of residence (Pyoambong), active time period (early Silla), and legacy in Korean history are referenced to support the theory that they may have been the same individual. However, this theory is not widely accepted due to historical inconsistencies such as Al-pyeong existing much prior to Hogong's appearance in the stories of early Silla and Hogong's exceptionally long lifespan; if they were the same person, Al-pyeong would have lived for nearly 200 years.

== Timeline ==
- In 20 BC, Hyeokgeose of Silla dispatched him to Mahan confederacy. The king of Mahan scolded him because Silla had not sent tribute, but Hogong bravely rebuked the king for his impoliteness. The king became angry at Hogong and tried to kill him, but the king's subordinates stopped him; Hogong was permitted to return home.
- In 58, he assumed the position of the minister's first rank.
- In 65, he discovered Kim Al-chi, who would become primogenitor of the Kim royal clan of Silla, in the forest of Gyerim.

== Popular culture ==
- Portrayed by Lee Byung-joon in the 2016–2017 KBS2 TV series Hwarang: The Poet Warrior Youth.
