= Jabi of Silla =

King of Silla from 458 to 479

Jabi
- Maripgan

Ruler of Silla
- Reign: 458–479
- Coronation: 458
- Predecessor: Nulji of Silla
- Successor: Soji of Silla
- Born: Unknown
- Died: 479; Silla
- Father: Nulji of Silla
- Mother: Queen Aro

Korean name
- Hangul: 자비 마립간
- Hanja: 慈悲麻立干
- RR: Jabi maripgan
- MR: Chabi maripkan

Jabi (r. 458–479, died 479), (Note: Some sources give this as 478, presumably due to a discrepancy between lunar and solar calendars.) also known by his title Jabi Maripgan, was the 20th ruler of the Koreanic kingdom Silla. He was the eldest son of King Nulji, and his mother was the daughter of King Silseong. He married the daughter of Kim Misaheun.

== Reign ==
During his reign Silla saw repeated invasions by the Wa and Goguryeo. In 474, Goguryeo launched a massive assault on Baekje, Silla's neighbor to the west. Jabi sent troops to aid Baekje, however, the soldiers arrived late and King Gaero was killed defending the capital. In order to defend the kingdom, Jabi has reorganized the military and built several fortresses.

Jabi's reign saw a renowned geomungo player and musician, known by his pseudonim Baek Gyeol. He was the son of Park Je-sang, who saved King Nulji's brothers. The music of the time was known as daeak (대악, 碓樂) or banga-ak (방아악).

King Jabi died in 479 and is considered as a possible owner of the Gold Crown Tomb located in Gyeongju, ascribed as 'King Isaji (尒斯智王)'. His son, Soji inherited the throne.

== Family ==
- Grandfather: King Naemul
- Grandmother: Lady Boban, the daughter of King Michu
- Father: King Nulji of Silla
- Mother: Lady Aro, of the Kim clan (아로부인 김씨), daughter of King Silseong
- Wife:
  - Lady Kim, of the Kim clan (왕후김씨), daughter of Kim Misaheun (김미사흔), married in 461
    - Son: King Soji of Silla
    - Daughter: Princess Junmyeong of the Kim clan (준명공주김씨)
  - Lady Kim, daughter of Kim Mul-ryeok (김물력)

== See also ==
- Three Kingdoms of Korea
- List of Korean monarchs
- List of Silla people

== Notes ==
Jabi of Silla House of Kim Died: 479
Regnal titles
| Preceded by Nulji | Ruler of Silla; 458–479 | Succeeded by Soji |
