= Family tree of Korean monarchs =

The following is a family tree of Korean monarchs.

== Goguryeo ==
Goguryeo monarchs' family tree

House of Ko
Dongmyeong; King of Goguryeo (58 BC–19 BC) r. 37 BC–19 BC
?	House of Buyeo
Yuri (38 BC–18 AD) r. 19 BC–18 AD	Biryu	Onjo of Baekje
?
Daemusin (4–44) r. 18–44	Minjung (?–48) r. 44–48	Go Jaesa	Kingdom of Baekje
Mobon (32–53) r. 48–53	Taejodae (47–165) r. 53–146	Chadae (71–165) r. 146–165	Sindae (89–179) r. 165–179
Sansang (?–227) r. 197–227	Gogukcheon (?–197) r. 179–197
Dongcheon (209–248) r. 227–248
Jungcheon (224–270) r. 248–270
Seocheon (?–292) r. 270–292
Bongsang (?–300) r. 292–300	Go Dol-go
Micheon (?–331) r. 300–331
Gogugwon ?-331-371
Sosurim ?-371-384	Gogugyang ?-384-391
Gwanggaeto the Great; 374-391-412
Jangsu; 394-412-491
Go Joda
Munja ?-491-519
Anjang ?-519-531	Anwon ?-531-545
Yangwon ?-545-559
Pyeongwon ?-559-590
Yeongyang ?-590-618	Yeongnyu ?-618-642	Go Daeyang
Bojang ?-642- 668-682
Ko Tŏngmu

== Baekje ==
Monarchs of Baekje family tree

House of Puyŏ
Onjo; 36-18-28
Daru; 9-28-77
Giru ?-77-128
Gaeru ?-128-166
Goi ?-234-286	Chogo ?-166-214
Chaekgye ?-286-298	Gusu ?-214-234
Bunseo ?-298-304	Biryu ?-304-344	Saban ?-234-?
Gye ?-344-346	Geunchogo ?-346-375
Geungusu ?-375-384
Jinsa ?-385-392	Chimnyu ?-384-385
Asin ?-392-405
Jeonji ?-405-420
Guisin; 404-420-427
Biyu ?-427-455
Gaero ?-455-475	Gonji ?-477
Munju ?-475-477	Dongseong ?-479-501
Samgeun; 465-477-479	Muryeong; 461-501-523
Seong ?-523-554
Hye; 527-598-599	Wideok; 525-554-598
Beop ?-599-600	Mu; 580-600-641
Uija; 599-641-660
Buyeo Yung; 615-682	Buyeo Pung ?-660-663-?

== Silla ==
Silla (57 BC – 935 CE) was one of the Three Kingdoms of Korea. In the early years, Silla was ruled by the Pak, Sǒk, and Kim families. Rulers of Silla had various titles, including Isageum, Maripgan, and Daewang. Like some Baekje king, some declared themselves emperor.

Silla monarchs family tree

Hyeokgeose b.69BC-d.4 AD r.57BC– 4 AD^{1}
Namhae d.24 r.4–24CE^{2}	Kim Alji
Yuri d.57 r.24-57^{3}	Lady; Ahyo	Talhae d.80 r.57-80^{4}	Seonghan
Ilseong d.154 r.134–154^{7}	Pasa d.112 r.80–112^{5}	昔仇鄒	金阿道
Adalla d.184 r.154–184^{8}	Jima d.134 r.112–134^{6}	Beolhyu d.196 r.184–196^{9}	金首留
朴碧芳	Goljeong	Imae	金郁甫
朴武英	Jobun d.247 r.230–247^{11}	Cheomhae d.261 r.247-261^{12}	Naehae d.230 r. 196–230^{10}	Gudo
朴判得	Yurye d.298 r.284-298^{14}	昔乞淑	光明夫人	Seok Uro	Michu r.262-284^{13}	金末仇	Kim; Daeseoji
朴光欽	Girim d.310 r.298-310^{15}	Heulhae d.356 r.310–356^{16}	Naemul d.402 r.356–402^{17}	Silseong d.417 r.402–417^{18}
朴美一	Nulji r.417–458^{19}	金卜好	金未斯欣
朴乃物	Jabi d.479 r.458-479^{20}	Galmunwang; Kim Seupbo	金仇天
朴相建	Soji r.479–500^{21}	Jijeung b.437–d.514 r.500-514^{22}	金柒夫
朴仁燁	Beopheung b.487-d.540 r.514–540^{23}	Ipjong d.537	金真宗	金順元
朴啓輔	Jinheung b.526-d.576 r.540-576^{24}	金依忠	金欽運
朴明信	Dongryun d.572	Jinji d.579 r.576 - 579^{25}	金斯多含	金摩次
朴貞環	Jinpyeong b.567-632 r.579 -632^{26}	Galmunwang; Guk-ban	Galmunwang; Baekban	Kim Yongsu	金元訓	玄聖王 金法宣
朴露兼	Seondeok d.647 r.632 - 647^{27}	Jindeok (Chindŏk) r.647-654^{28}	Muyeol b.604–d.661 r.654–661^{29}	神英王 金義寬
朴楠善	Kim Yushin b.595-d.673	Lady; Jiso	Munmu b.626–d.681 r.661–681^{30}	Kim Inmun b.629-d.694	興平王 金魏文
朴金山	Sinmun r.681–692^{31}	Hyoyang
朴應瓚	Hyoso b.687-d.702 r.692–702^{32}	Seongdeok r.702–737^{33}	Wonseong d.798 r.785-798^{38}
朴德興	Hyoseong d.742 r.737-742^{34}	Gyeongdeok r.742-765^{35}	Lady; Saso	Haechan; Kim Hyobang	Kim; Ingyeom	惠康王; Kim Ye-yŏng
朴大寧	Hyegong b.758–d.780 r.765–780^{36}	Seondeok d.785 r.780–785^{37}	Soseong d.800 r.798–800^{39}	Heondeok d.826 r.809–826^{41}	Kim; Chunggong	Heungdeok; 777-836 r.826–836^{42}	Kim; Gyun-jung d.836	Kim; Heon-jeong
朴尼淳	Aejang b.788–d.809 r.800–809^{40}	Minae b.817-d.839 r.838–839^{44}	Sinmu b.787-d.839 r.839^{45}	Heonan d.861 r.857–861^{47}	Huigang d.838 r.836–838^{43}
朴隆釗	Munseong d. 857 r.839–857^{46}	Kim Kye-myŏng
朴之坤	朴元弘	弘毅王 金安	惠成王; Kim Wi-hong	Gyeongmun b.841-d.875 r.861–875^{48}
朴成順	成武王 朴順弘	朴文官	睿興王 金敏恭	Heongang c.861-d.886 r.875–886^{49}	Jeonggang c.863-d.887 r.886–887^{50}	Jinseong c.865-d.897 r.887–897^{51}
Daeachan; Park Ye–gyeom	貞和夫人	興廉王 朴文元	水宗	宣興王 金實虹	Hyogong b.883-d.912 r.897–912^{52}
Sindeok d.917 r.912–917^{53}	Princess; Uiseong	聖僖王 大尊	懿興王 金仁慶
Gyeongae d.927 r.924–927^{55}	Gyeongmyeong d.924 r.917–924^{54}	長沙宅	Kim; Hyojong	Princess; Gyea
Gyeongsun c.897-d.978 r.927–935^{56}
Maui

== Balhae ==
Balhae (698-926) was an ancient Korean kingdom established after the fall of Goguryeo. Balhae occupied southern parts of Northeast China, Primorsky Krai, and the northern part of the Korean Peninsula.

Balhae monarchs' family tree

Dae; Jungsang ?-698
Go ?-698-719	Dae Ya-bal
Mu ?-719-737	Dae Won-gi
Mun ?-737-793	Dae Won-ui ?-793	Dae; Gwangdeok
Dae; Goeng-rim	Gang ?-794-809	Seon ?-818-830
Seong ?-793-794	Jeong ?-809-812	Hui ?-812-817	Gan ?-817-818	Dae Deok
Dae Ijin ?-830-857	Geonhwang ?-857-871
□
Hyeonseok ?-871-894
Dae Wihae ?-894-907
Dae Inseon ?-907-926

== Goryeo ==
The Goryeo dynasty ruled in Korea from 918 to 1392. It comprised 34 kings in 17 generations. What follows is, first, a selective genealogy of the reigning Wang clan, and second, a table showing the relations between the Mongol-led Yuan dynasty and Goryeo royalty.

Goryeo monarchs' family tree

House of Wang
Wang Ryung d. 897; Sejo
Wang Geon; 877–943; Taejo r. 918–943^{1}
Wang Mu; 912–945; Hyejong r. 943–945^{2}	Wang Yo; 923–949; Jeongjong r. 945–949^{3}	Wang So; 925–975; Gwangjong r. 949–975^{4}	Wang Uk; Daejong d. 969	Wang Uk; Anjong d. 996	Prince Hyoeun
Prince; Heunghwa ?–960	Prince; Gyeongchun	Wang Ju; 955–981; Gyeongjong r. 975–981^{5}	Prince; Hyodeok	Wang Chi; 960–997; Seongjong r. 981–997^{6}	Wang Sun; 992–1031; Hyeonjong r. 1009–1031^{8}
Wang Song; 980–1009; Mokjong r. 997–1009^{7}	Wang Heum; 1016–1034; Deokjong r. 1031–1034^{9}	Wang Hyeong; 1018–1046; Jeongjong r. 1034–1046^{10}	Wang Hwi; 1019–1083; Munjong r. 1046–1083^{11}
Wang Bang; Prince; Aesang	Wang Hun; 1047–1083; Sunjong r. 1083^{12}	Wang Un; 1049–1094; Seonjong r. 1083–1094^{13}	Wang Hui; 1054–1105; Sukjong r. 1095–1105^{15}	Uicheon b. 1055 – d. 1101
Wang Uk; 1084–1097; Heonjong r. 1094–1095^{14}	Wang Yun; Prince; Hansan	Wang U 1079–1122; Yejong r. 1105–1122^{16}
Wang Hae; 1109–1146; Injong r. 1122–1146^{17}
Wang Hyeon; 1127–1173; Uijong r. 1146–1170^{18}	Wang Ho; 1131–1202; Myeongjong r. 1170–1197^{19}	Wang Tak; 1144–1204; Sinjong r. 1197–1204^{20}
Wang Ki; Crown Prince; Hyoryong; 1149–?	Wang O 1152–1213; Gangjong r. 1211–1213^{22}	Wang Yeong; 1181–1237; Huijong r. 1204–1211^{21}	Wang Seo; Prince; Yangyang
Wang Jeol; 1192–1259; Gojong r. 1213–1259^{23}	Wang Ji; Prince; Changwon; 1197–1262	Wang In
Wang Sik; 1214–1274; Wonjong r. 1259–1274^{24}	Wang Chang; 1223-? Yeongjong r. 1269	Wang; Yeong
Wang Geo; 1236–1308; Chungnyeol r. 1274–1308^{25}	Wang Yi; Prince; Siyang ?-1266	Wang Jong; Prince; Sunan	Wang Bun d. 1291
Wang Jang; 1275–1325; Chungseon r. 1308–1313^{26}	Wang Yu; Prince; Sunhwa ?-1360	Prince Hyohwi
Wang Man; 1294–1339; Chungsuk r. 1313–1330; 1332–1339^{27}	Wang Gam; Prince; Gwangreung ?–1310	Wang Hye; Prince; Deokheung; 1314–1367	Wang Gyun	Wang Hui	Wang Yeon
Wang Jeong; 1315–1344; Chunghye r. 1330–1332; 1339–1344^{28}	Prince; Yongsan; 1325–1341	Wang Jeon; 1330–1374; Gongmin r. 1351–1374^{31}	Wang Yo; 1345–1394; Gongyang r. 1389–1392^{34}	Wang U
Wang Seok-Gi; 1341–1375	Wang Hun; 1337–1348; Chungmok r. 1344–1348^{29}	Wang Jeo; 1338–1351; Chungjeong r. 1348–1351^{30}	Wang U 1365–1389; U r. 1374–1388^{32}	Wang Seok; Crown Prince; Jeongseong ?–1394
Wang Je	Wang Chang; 1381–1389; Chang r. 1388–1389^{33}

=== Marriage relations with Mongol Empire ===
Yuan dynasty - Goryeo marriage relations

Kublai Khan; 1215–1294; Khagan 1260–71; Shizu of Yuan r. 1271–1294
Zhenjin (1243–1285)	Aoluchi	Hugechi	Princess; Jeguk; 1259–1297	Chungnyeol of Goryeo (r. 1274–1308)^{25}
Darmabala d. 1292; Shunzong 顺宗	Kamala (d. 1302)	Temür Buhua	Esen Temür	Chungseon of Goryeo (r. 1308–1313)^{26}
Emperor Wuzong of Yuan r. 1307–1311	Amuge	Princess; Gyeguk (d. 1315)	Shuosiban	Princess; Bokguk (d. 1319)	Chungsuk of Goryeo (r. 1313–1330; 1332–1339)^{27}
Emperor; Mingzong of Yuan r. 1329	Boluo Temür	Princess; Joguk; 1308–1325	Princess; Deoknyeong ?– 1375	Chunghye of Goryeo (r. 1330–1332; 1339–1344)^{28}	Gongmin of Goryeo (r. 1351–1374)^{31}
Empress Gi; 1315– 1369/70	Emperor; Huizong of Yuan r. 1333–1368/70	Princess; Noguk (d. 1365)	Chungmok of Goryeo (r. 1344–1348)^{29}

== Joseon and Korean Empire ==
House of Yi/Joseon Kings family tree

– – – – – – - The dashed lines denote the adoptions

(1204–1274); Yi An-Sa (Mokjo)
(1236–?); Yi Haeng-Ni (Ikjo)
(1265–1342); Yi Ch'un (Dojo)
(1315–1361); Yi Cha-Ch'un (Hwanjo)
KING OF; JOSEON
(1335–1408) Taejo r. 1392–1398^{(1)}
(1357–1419) Jeongjong r. 1398–1400^{(2)}	(1367–1422) Taejong r. 1400–1418^{(3)} (Note: Taejong was the first reigning Joseon king to be recognized by the Ming dynasty under the tributary system.)
(1397–1450) Sejong the Great r. 1418–1450^{(4)}
(1414–1452) Munjong r. 1450–1452^{(5)}	(1417–1468) Sejo r. 1455–1468^{(7)}
(1441–1457) Danjong r. 1452–1455^{(6)}	(1438–1457); Crown Prince; Uigyeong	(1450–1469) Yejong r. 1468–1469^{(8)}
(1457–1494) Seongjong r. 1469–1494^{(9)}
(1476–1506) Yeonsangun r. 1494–1506^{(10)} (Note: Unlike other Joseon monarchs, who could receive a temple name after their death, Yeonsangun and Gwanghaegun never had one due to being overthrown and gun denotes "prince" instead of king.)	(1486–1544) Jungjong r. 1506–1544^{(11)}
(1515–1545) Injong r. 1544–1545^{(12)}	(1530–1559); Deokheung; Daewongun	(1534–1567) Myeongjong r. 1545–1567^{(13)}
(1552–1608) Seonjo r. 1567–1608^{(14)}
(1575–1641) Gwanghaegun r. 1608–1623^{(15)}	(1580–1619); Prince; Jeongwon	(1598–1624); Prince; Heungan (Note: The anti-king during the rebel (Yi Gwal's rebellion) in 1624.)
(1595–1649) Injo r. 1623–1649^{(16)} (Note: After the Qing invasion of Joseon, Injo was recognized by the Qing dynasty instead of the Ming dynasty, under the tributary system.)	(1599–1615); Grand Prince; Neungchang
(1619–1659) Hyojong r. 1649–1659^{(17)}	(1622–1658); Grand Prince; Inpyeong
(1641–1674) Hyeonjong r. 1659–1674^{(18)}	(1639–1670); Prince; Boknyeong
(1661–1720) Sukjong r. 1674–1720^{(19)}	(1661–1722); Prince; Uiwon
(1688–1724) Gyeongjong r. 1720–1724^{(20)}	(1694–1776) Yeongjo r. 1724–1776^{(21)}	(1699–1719); Prince; Yeollyeong	(1693–1763); Prince; Anheung
(1719–1728); Crown Prince; Hyojang	(1735–1762); Crown Prince; Sado	(1728–1796); Yi Jin-ik
(1752–1800) Jeongjo r. 1776–1800^{(22)}	(1754–1801); Prince Euneon	(1755–1771); Prince; Eunsin	(1752–1822); Yi Byeong-won
(1790–1834) Sunjo r. 1800–1834^{(23)}	(1785–1841); Jeongye; Daewongun	(1788–1836); Prince; Namyeon
(1809–1830); Crown Prince; Hyomyeong	(1831–1864) Cheoljong r. 1849–1864^{(25)}	(1821–1898); Heungseon; Daewongun
(1827–1849) Heonjong r. 1834–1849^{(24)}
EMPEROR OF; KOREA
(1852–1919) Gojong (Gwangmu) r.K 1864–1897 r.E 1897–1907^{(26)} (Note: Gojong became the first emperor of the Korean Empire in 1897 and abdicated in 1907; he was demoted to "King Emeritus Yi" in 1910.)
(1874–1926) Sunjong (Yunghui) r. 1907–1910^{(27)} (Note: Sunjong abdicated in 1910 and became "King Yi" at the same time.)	(1877–1955); Prince Imperial Ui	(1897–1970) Prince Imperial Yeong; Yi Un^{(28)} (Note: Yi Un became the Imperial Crown Prince of the Korean Empire in 1907 by Japanese government, only to be demoted to the "Crown Prince of King Yi" in 1910. He succeeded the title King Yi in 1926 and lost it in 1947 according to the new constitution in Japan. His posthumous name, Crown Prince Euimin (의민황태자), was made by the Jeonju Lee Royal Family Association.) (Note: Director of the Jeonju Lee Royal Family Association.)
(1938–2014); Yi Gap	(1941–); Yi Seok (Note: Claimed to be the "first successor" appointed by Yi Bangja after the death of Yi Ku in 2005.)	(1931–2005) Yi Ku^{(29)} (Note: Yi Ku became the "Crown Prince of King Yi" after his birth and he lost the title in 1947. His posthumous name, Prince Imperial Hoeun (회은황세손), was made by the Jeonju Lee Royal Family Association.)
(1962–) Yi Won^{(30)} (Note: On 10 July 2005, Yi Won was adopted to be Yi Ku's heir.)

== See also ==
- History of Korea
- List of monarchs of Korea
- House of Yi
