= Yurye of Silla =

King of Silla from 284 to 298

King Yurye 유례 이사금 儒禮尼師今
- Isageum

Ruler of Silla
- Reign: 284-298
- Coronation: 284
- Predecessor: Michu of Silla
- Successor: Girim of Silla
- Born: Unknown
- Died: 298; Silla
Posthumous name
- King Yurye (유례 이사금; 儒禮尼師今)
- Father: Jobun of Silla
- Mother: Lady from the Park clan

- Yurye of Silla
- Hangul: 유례 이사금
- Hanja: 儒禮尼師今
- RR: Yurye isageum
- MR: Yurye isagŭm

Yurye (r. 284–298, died 298), also known as Yuri or by his official title Yurye Isageum, was the fourteenth ruler of the Korean state of Silla. He was from the Seok clan and the son of King Jobun, but his mother was from the Park clan, and a descendant of Bak Hyeokgeose.

== Reign ==
The Samguk sagi relates that Yurye's mother conceived from starlight. It also records repeated invasions from Wa during his reign, and relatively cordial relations with Baekje.

Upon ascending the throne, Yurye granted a high ministerial position to Kim Malgu (김말구), the brother of the previous king Michu, and relied on his wisdom throughout his reign. Kim Malgu was also the father of the 17th king, Naemul.

He died without an heir and there is no record of his wife or children. The throne passed to Girim, the son of Yurye's brother, Geolsuk.

== Family ==
- Grandfather: Seok Goljeong (석골정)
- Grandmother: Lady Ongmo, of the Kim clan (옥모부인 김씨), daughter of Gudo Galmunwang (구도 갈문왕)
- Father: Jobun of Silla
- Mother: Lady from the Park clan (미소부인 박씨), daughter of Naehae of Silla

== See also ==
- Three Kingdoms of Korea
- Rulers of Korea
- History of Korea

Yurye of Silla House of Seok Died: 298
Regnal titles
Preceded by Michu	Ruler of Silla; 284–298	Succeeded by Girim
