= Heulhae of Silla =

King of Silla from 310 to 356

King Heulhae 흘해 이사금 訖解尼師今
- Isageum

Ruler of Silla
- Reign: 310-356
- Coronation: 310
- Predecessor: Girim of Silla
- Successor: Naemul of Silla
- Born: Unknown
- Died: 356; Silla
Posthumous name
- King Heulhae (흘해 이사금; 訖解尼師今)
- Father: Seok Uro
- Mother: Lady Myeongwon

Korean name
- Hangul: 흘해 이사금
- Hanja: 訖解尼師今
- RR: Heulhae isageum
- MR: Hŭrhae isagŭm

Heulhae (r. 310–356, died 356), titled Heulhae Isageum, was the sixteenth ruler of the Korean kingdom of Silla. He was a member of the aristocratic Seok clan, which held the throne for much of the early period of Silla. According to the Samguk sagi, he was the son of the general Uro, who was the son of Naehae Isageum. Although we do not know his year of birth, he was young when he first came to the throne.

== Reign ==
According to the most wide-spread theory, he was the son of Uro, who was born to King Naehae and his mother was Lady Myeongwon, the daughter of Jobun of Silla. However, there is also a theory that he may have been Naehae's son, although this is irrealistic, considering the age gap (Naehae died in 230). Modern historians theorise that there may have been two or even three generations between Uro and Heulhae, too.

According to the Samguk sagi, he was frail in his early childhood and had to be supported when walking or sitting on a horse. He was, however, described as handsome, intelligent and a knowledgeable king. He ascended the throne after Girim's death in 310, as ministers considered him wise despite his young age.

The two documents describing this period, the Samguk sagi (which is considered historically more accurate) and the Samguk yusa (that mainly collects legends) differ significantly regarding events during Heulhae's rule. The legendarium says that Baekje attacked Silla for the first time during this period, while the Sagi provides several previous accounts, and also states that Silla and Baekje were at peace during Heulhae's reign and Silla was actually at odds with Wa. This happened also because Uro was killed by the Wa during Michu's reign when he was a general. The Samguk sagi also relates an alliance by marriage with Wa, which was concluded in 313, but in 344, when Wa wanted Heulhae's daughter in marriage, he refused. In 346, they attacked Silla and reached as far as Gyeongju but were successfully defeated.

Heulhae placed great emphasis on helping his people, during natural disasters, he actively distributed help to those struggling and also halted the renovation of the palace during a draught. Both the Sagi and the Yusa attribute the construction of the Byeokgolje Reservoir to him, but because the area was under Baekje rule at the time, this is heavily disputed by modern historians.

Heulhae died without a male heir, thus the throne went back to the Kim clan, and Michu's nephew, Naemul became king.

== Family ==
- Grandfather: Naehae of Silla (died 230, r. 196–230)
- Grandmother: Lady from the Seok Clan (석부인 석씨), daughter of Seok Goljeong (석골정)
- Father: Seok Uro (석우로)
- Mother: Lady Myeongwon, of the Seok clan (명원부인 석씨), daughter of Jobun of Silla
- Child: One daughter

== See also ==
- Three Kingdoms of Korea
- Rulers of Korea
- History of Korea

Heulhae of Silla House of Seok Died: 356
Regnal titles
Preceded by Girim	Ruler of Silla; 310–356	Succeeded by Naemul
