= Beolhyu of Silla =

King of Silla from 184 to 196

King Beolhyu 벌휴 이사금 伐休尼師今
- Isageum

Ruler of Silla
- Reign: 184-196
- Coronation: 184
- Predecessor: Adalla of Silla
- Successor: Naehae of Silla
- Born: Unknown
- Died: 196; Silla
Posthumous name
- King Beolhyu (벌휴 이사금; 伐休尼師今)
- Father: Seok Gu Chu
- Mother: Queen Jijinaelye

Korean name
- Hangul: 벌휴 이사금, 발휘 이사금
- Hanja: 伐休尼師今, 發暉尼師今
- RR: Beolhyu isageum, Balhwi isageum
- MR: Pŏrhyu isagŭm, Parhwi isagŭm

Beolhyu (died 196, r. 184–196) was the ninth king of Silla, one of the Three Kingdoms of Korea. He is also known as Balhui Isageum, Isageum being the royal title in early Silla. As a descendant of Silla's 4th king Talhae, his surname was Seok.

== Family ==
- Grandfather: Talhae of Silla (탈해 이사금)
- Grandmother: Queen Ahyo, daughter of King Namhae (아효부인 박씨)
- Father: Crown Prince Seok Gu-chu (태자 석구추)
- Mother: Queen Jijinaelye of the Kim clan (지진내례부인 김씨)

Consort and issue(s):

- Queen, of the Kim clan (김씨), niece of Kim Alji
  - Seok Goljeong, Galmunwang (석골정), 1st son
    - Grandson: Jobun of Silla (r. 230–247, d.247), 11th ruler of Silla
    - Grandson: Cheomhae of Silla (r. 247–261, d.261) 12th ruler of Silla
    - Granddaughter: Lady Seok
    - Grandson: Seok Deungbo ( 석등보昔)
  - Seok Imae (석이매), 2nd son
    - Grandson: Naehae of Silla (d. 230, r.196–230)–10th ruler of Silla

== Background ==
The Samguk sagi states that he was made king by the people when his predecessor Adalla died without heir. His accession to the throne broke several generations of continuous rule by the Park clan, descendants of Silla's founder Bak Hyeokgeose.

Beolhyu is recorded to be the grandson of King Talhae, but this is questioned because he ascended the throne 104 years after Talhae's death. His mother was of the Kim clan.

== Reign ==
In 185, he conquered a small chiefdom called Somun-guk (in today's Uiseong). Silla warred with the neighboring Korean kingdom Baekje in 188 (around Jincheon), 189, and 190 (around Yecheon).

== See also ==
- Rulers of Korea
- History of Korea
- Three Kingdoms of Korea

Beolhyu of Silla House of Seok Died: 196
Regnal titles
Preceded by Adalla	Ruler of Silla; 184–196	Succeeded by Naehae
