= Adalla of Silla =

King of Silla from 154 to 184

Adalla 아달라 이사금 阿達羅尼師今
- Isageum
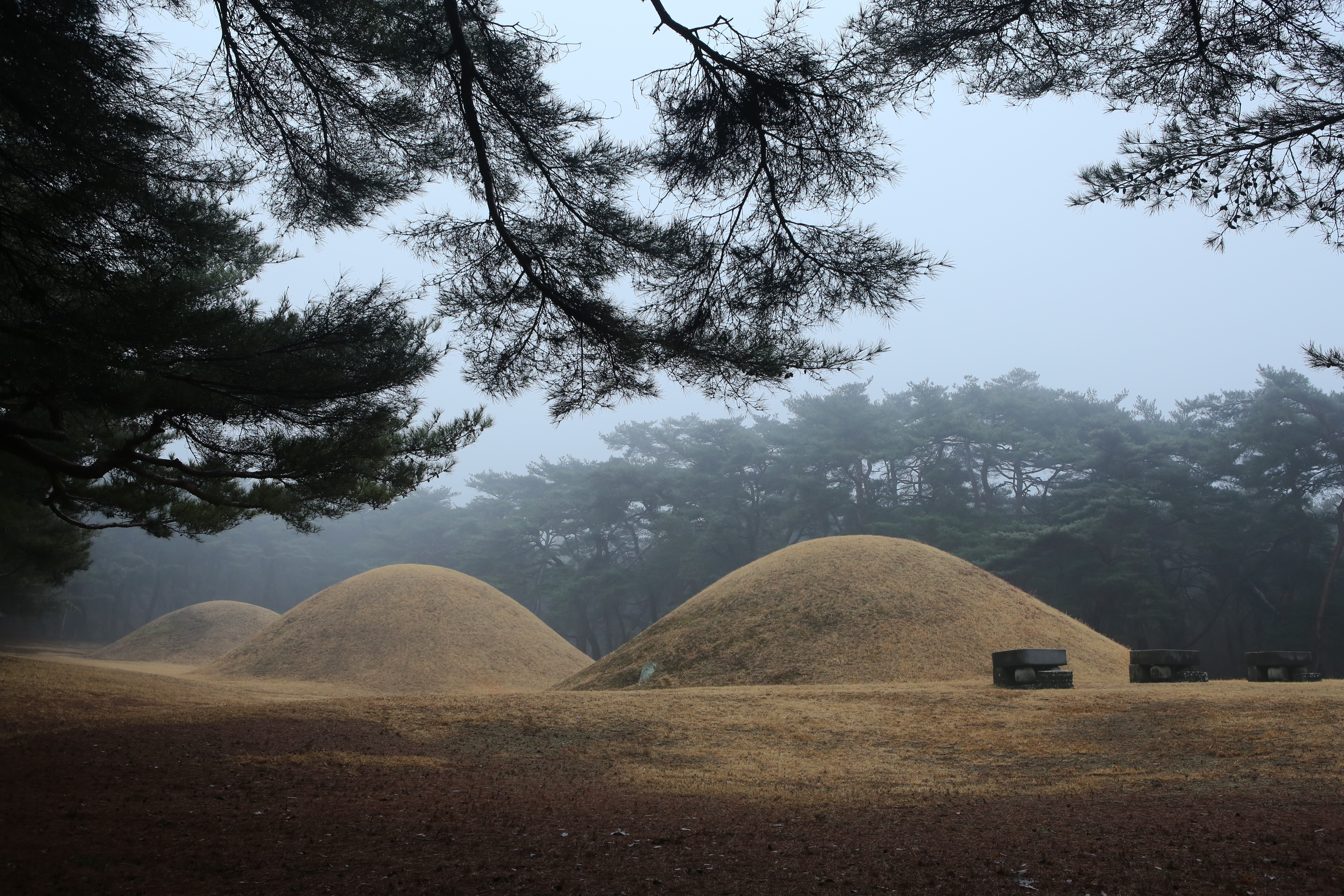
- Tomb of King Adalla

Ruler of Silla
- Reign: 154-184 CE
- Coronation: 154 CE
- Predecessor: Ilseong of Silla
- Successor: Beolhyu of Silla
- Died: 184 CE
Posthumous name
- King Adalla (아달라 이사금; 阿達羅尼師今)
- Father: Ilseong of Silla
- Mother: Queen Park

Korean name
- Hangul: 아달라 이사금
- Hanja: 阿達羅尼師今
- RR: Adalla isageum
- MR: Adalla isagŭm

Adalla (died 184, r. 154–184) was the eighth ruler of Silla, one of the Three Kingdoms of Korea. He is commonly called Adalla Isageum, isageum being the royal title in early Silla. As a descendant of Silla's founder Hyeokgeose, his surname was Bak.

== Family ==
- Grandfather: Yuri Isageum or more probably Prince Ado
- Grandmother: Unnamed queen
- Father: Ilseong of Silla (died 154, r. 134–154)
- Mother: Unnamed queen of the Park clan (모후 박씨)
- Spouse:
  - Princess Naerye of the Park clan (내례부인 박씨), daughter of Jima of Silla

== Background ==
He was the eldest son of King Ilseong, his mother being of the Bak clan. He married the daughter of King Jima, making this a marriage of 8th degree consanguinity. He was the last of the Bak clan to rule over early Silla. Descendants of Bak Hyeokgeose would rule again near the end of Unified Silla.

== Reign ==
Judging from the reports in the Samguk sagi, Adalla's reign was a time of considerable expansion. However, some scholars doubt the chronology because Silla was still a small state.

He is said to have opened the road over Haneuljae (in present-day Mungyeong) in 157, and also the pass of Jungnyeong (in present-day Yeongju) in 159, extending Silla north of the Sobaek mountains. Tensions increased with the rival Korean kingdom Baekje for harboring a Silla traitor. The Samguk sagi reports 20,000 soldiers and 8,000 cavalry of Silla battled Baekje in 167. During his reign, Adalla maintained peaceful relations with the Wa of Japan, who sent an envoy in 158. Himiko sent another envoy in 173.

In AD 157, According to the Samguk yusa, This is the time when the legends of Yeono and Seo(延烏郎細烏女說話) occurred. Kamigaito saw Ito(怡土国)'s "Itsuhiko" as Yeono. In other words, the Itsuhiko, which was established in this area after crossing from Iseoguk(present-day Cheongdo) of Silla, confronted the forces of Yamato, Hokuriku(北陸) and Setona Ikai(瀬戸內海), and formed an alliance with Silla. This shows the interaction between ancient Korea and Japan.

== Adala's last decade of history question ==
According to the Samguk sagi, there are no record between 174 and 184 years. Major questions arise during this period. Considering the fact that Park will not succeed to the throne, but Seok, the Beolhyu Isageum, will succeed to the throne afterwards. It can be estimated that there was considerable confusion within Silla at that time. In particular, the mother of Naehae Isageum, is written as Lady Naerye(內禮夫人), who is the same person as Queen of Adalla Isageum.

Samguk sagi:

- 173 AD, spring, first month, use the Gudo(俱道) who is a Michu's father as a Pajinchan(波珍湌 : 4th in official rank 17) and KooSoohye(仇須兮) as an Ilgilchan(一吉湌 : 7th in official rank 17)
- 173 AD, spring, second month, A problem happens in the progenitor tomb and an epidemic breaks out.
- 173 AD, summer, fifth month, Himiko (queen) sent an envoy.
- 174 AD, spring, first month, It rains with a sandstorm.
- 174 AD, spring, second month, A well dries.
- 184 AD, spring, third month, A king dies.

== Legacy ==
There is no record of his activities during the last decade of his reign. He died without a male heir, and was succeeded by the Seok clan.

Adalla's tomb is believed to lie next to those of two later kings of Bak Hyeokgeose's line, in the Samneung complex near Namsan in central Gyeongju.

== See also ==
- Three Kingdoms of Korea
- Rulers of Korea
- History of Korea

== Notes ==
1. "Samreung & Tomb of King Gyeongae(Historic site No. 219 and 222)". Kyoung Ju Tour Guide (Sorabol College). Archived from the original on 2006-01-03.

Adalla of Silla House of Park Died: 184
Regnal titles
Preceded by Ilseong	Ruler of Silla; 154–184	Succeeded by Beolhyu
