= Cheomhae of Silla =

King of Silla from 247 to 261

King Cheomhae 첨해 이사금 沾解尼師今
- Isageum

Ruler of Silla
- Reign: 247-261
- Coronation: 247
- Predecessor: Jobun of Silla
- Successor: Michu of Silla
- Born: ?
- Died: 261; Silla
Posthumous name
- King Cheomhae (첨해 이사금; 沾解尼師今)
- Father: Seok Goljeong
- Mother: Queen Ongmo

Korean name
- Hangul: 첨해 이사금
- Hanja: 沾解尼師今
- RR: Cheomhae isageum
- MR: Ch'ŏmhae isagŭm

Cheomhae (r. 247–261, died 261), often known by his title Cheomhae Isageum, was the twelfth ruler of the Korean kingdom of Silla. He was a Seok, and the younger brother of the previous king, Jobun.

== Reign ==
The Samguk sagi reports that the Cheomhae forged a truce with Goguryeo, and that his reign saw repeated clashes with Baekje. Upon ascending the throne he made his father sesingalmunwang (세신갈문왕). He conquered further territories during his rule, including present-day Daegu and Sangju.

Cheomhae's kinsman, the general Uro, was slain by the people of Wa in the year 250.

The defeat at this time dealt a serious blow to Silla. Later, Silla became close to Baekje and Goguryeo to guard against Japan even though Baekje had close relations and was allied with Japan. Given that some of the conquered city-states reappeared as Gaya, some city-states became independent. It was not until the reign of King Jijeung that Silla overcame the aftereffects and resumed its conquest.

There are no records of his wife or children. When he fell ill and died in the winter of 261, the throne went to Michu, the son-in-law of Jobun.

== Family ==
- Grandfather: Beolhyu of Silla (died 196, r. 184–196)
- Grandmother: Unknown Queen
- Father: Seok Goljeong (석골정)
- Mother: Lady Ongmo, of the Park clan (옥모)
- Brother: Jobun of Silla

== See also ==
- Three Kingdoms of Korea
- Rulers of Korea
- History of Korea

Cheomhae of Silla House of Seok Died: 261
Regnal titles
Preceded by Jobun	Ruler of Silla; 247–261	Succeeded by Michu
