= Girim of Silla =

King of Silla from 298 to 310

King Girim 기림 이사금 基臨尼師今
- Isageum

Ruler of Silla
- Reign: 298-310
- Coronation: 298
- Predecessor: Yurye of Silla
- Successor: Heulhae of Silla
- Born: Unknown
- Died: 310; Silla
Posthumous name
- King Girim (기림 이사금; 基臨尼師今)
- Father: Seok Gul-Suk
- Mother: ???

Korean name
- Hangul: 기림 이사금
- Hanja: 基臨尼師今
- RR: Girim isageum
- MR: Kirim isagŭm

Girim (r. 298–310, died 310), whose name is sometimes given as Girip and also as Gigu, was the fifteenth ruler of Silla.

== Reign ==
According to the Samguk Yusa, in 307, he gave the country the name "Silla", as it was previously renamed "Gyerim" by Talhae of Silla. However, the renaming to Silla actually happened during the reign of Jijeung of Silla in the 6th century.

== Family ==
- Grandmother: Lady from the Park clan
- Grandfather: Jobun of Silla
- Father: Seok Geolsuk (석걸숙)
- Mother: Unknown lady

The Samguk sagi records that he was either the grandson or great-grandson of King Jobun. The Samguk Yusa pertains that he was the son of Jobun and thus the half-brother of Yurye, however modern historians consider this unlikely because of the age gap. There is no record of a wife or children, after his death, the throne went to Heulhae, the grandson of Jobun by his daughter Lady Myeongwon and Seok Uro (the son of Naehae of Silla)

== See also ==
- Three Kingdoms of Korea
- Rulers of Korea
- History of Korea

Girim of Silla House of Seok Died: 310
Regnal titles
Preceded by Yurye	Ruler of Silla; 298–310	Succeeded by Heulhae
