= Chronicles of the Three Kingdoms =

The Chronicles of the Three Kingdoms may refer to:

- Records of the Three Kingdoms, a history of the Three Kingdoms period of China.
- Samguk Sagi, a history of the Three Kingdoms period of Korea.

== See also ==
- Romance of the Three Kingdoms
