= Pyeonghae O clan =

Korean clan from North Gyeongsang Province

- Country: Korea
- Current region: Uljin County
- Founder: O Geuk jung

Pyeonghae O clan (Korean: 평해 오씨; Hanja: 平海 吳氏) was one of the Korean clans. Their Bon-gwan was in Uljin County, North Gyeongsang Province. According to the research in 1985, the number of Pyeonghae O clan was 1264. Their founder was O Geuk jung. O Geuk jung was a descendant of O Hyeon bo (Hanja: 吳賢輔) who served as a Tong Zhongshu Menxia Pingzhangshi (Hanja: 同中書門下平章事). O Hyeon bo (Hanja: 吳賢輔) was a 24th descendant of O Cheom (Hanja: 吳瞻) who came over from China to Silla during Jijeung of Silla’s reign in Silla dynasty.

== See also ==
- Korean clan names of foreign origin
