= Nagan O clan =

Korean clan from South Jeolla Province

- Country: Korea
- Current region: Suncheon
- Founder: O Sa ryong

Nagan O clan (Korean: 낙안 오씨; Hanja: 樂安 吳氏) was one of the Korean clans. Their Bon-gwan was in Suncheon, South Jeolla Province. According to the research in 2000, the number of Nagan O clan was 9135. Their founder was O Sa ryong. O Sa ryong was a 32nd descendant of O Eung (Hanja: 吳膺) who was a second son of O Cheom (Hanja: 吳瞻). O Cheom (Hanja: 吳瞻) came over from China to Silla during Jijeung of Silla’s reign in Silla dynasty. O Sa ryong was appointed as Prince of Nagan (Hanja: 楽安君) and began Nagan O clan because he defeated enemies when he served as government official during Goryeo period.

== See also ==
- Korean clan names of foreign origin
