= Yeongwon O clan =

Korean clan from South Pyongan Province

- Country: Korea
- Current region: Nyongwon County
- Founder: O Sa chung

Yeongwon O clan (Korean: 영원 오씨; Hanja: 寧遠 吳氏) was one of the Korean clans. Their Bon-gwan was in Nyongwon County, South Pyongan Province. According to the research in 2017, the number of Yeongwon O clan was 80. Their founder was O Sa chung. O Sa chung was from Gyeongsang Province and descendant of O Cheom (Hanja: 吳瞻) who came over from China to Silla during Jijeung of Silla’s reign in Silla dynasty.

== See also ==
- Korean clan names of foreign origin
