= Jobun of Silla =

King of Silla from 230 to 247

King Jobun 조분 이사금 助賁尼師今
- Isageum

Ruler of Silla
- Reign: 230-247
- Coronation: 230
- Predecessor: Naehae of Silla
- Successor: Cheomhae of Silla
- Born: Unknown
- Died: 247; Silla
Posthumous name
- King Jobun (조분 이사금; 助賁尼師今)
- Father: Seok Goljeong
- Mother: Queen Ongmo

- Jobun of Silla
- Hangul: 조분 이사금
- Hanja: 助賁尼師今
- RR: Jobun isageum
- MR: Chobun isagŭm

Jobun (r. 230–247, died 247), also known by his title Jobun Isageum, was the eleventh king of the Korean state of Silla. He was the grandson of Beolhyu Isageum, and a member of the Seok clan. He was the son of Goljeong with Lady Ongmo, a daughter of Kim Gudo. Lady Ongmo's brother was Michu Isageum.

The Samguk sagi also reports that the small country of Gammun-guk (near present-day Gimcheon) was conquered by Jobun's general Uro in 231. Japanese forces attacked the capital but Jobun Isageum wins against the Japanese in 232. Golbeol-guk (near present-day Yeongcheon) surrendered in 236. Baekje attacked the western frontier of Silla in 239. Clashes with Goguryeo and Wa took place during Jobun's reign.

== Family ==
- Grandfather: Beolhyu of Silla (died 196, r. 184–196)
- Grandmother: Queen, of the Kim clan (김씨), niece of Kim Alji
- Father: Seok Goljeong (석골정), also known as Sesin Galmunwang (세신갈문왕)
- Mother: Queen Ongmo, of the Park clan (옥모부인 김씨), daughter of Gudo Galmunwang (구도 갈문왕), sister of Michu of Silla
- 1st Spouse:
  - Princess Aihye, of the Seok Clan (아이혜부인), daughter of Naehae of Silla, his cousin
    - Daughter: Lady Myeongwon, of the Seok clan (명원부인 석씨), 1st daughter
      - married Seok Uro
    - Lady Gwangmyeong (광명부인 석씨), 2nd daughter
      - married Michu of Silla
  - 2nd spouse: Lady of the Park clan (미소부인 박씨), daughter of Naeum Galmunwang (나음갈문왕)
    - Yurye of Silla (유례 이사금; d. 298), 1st son
    - Seok Gul-suk, Galmunwang (석걸숙), 2nd son
      - Grandson: Girim of Silla, the 15th king of Silla

== See also ==
- Rulers of Korea
- Three Kingdoms of Korea
- History of Korea

Jobun of Silla House of Seok Died: 247
Regnal titles
Preceded by Naehae	Ruler of Silla; 230–247	Succeeded by Cheomhae
