= Nulji of Silla =

King of Silla from 417 to 458

King Nulji 눌지 마립간 訥祇麻立干
- Maripgan

Ruler of Silla
- Reign: 417-458
- Coronation: 417
- Predecessor: Silseong of Silla
- Successor: Jabi of Silla
- Born: Unknown
- Died: 458; Silla
Posthumous name
- King Nulji (눌지 마립간; 訥祇麻立干)
- Father: Naemul of Silla
- Mother: Lady Boban

- Nulji of Silla
- Hangul: 눌지 마립간
- Hanja: 訥祇麻立干
- RR: Nulji maripgan
- MR: Nulchi maripkan

Nulji (reigned 417–458) was the nineteenth ruler (maripgan) of Silla, one of the Three Kingdoms of Korea. He was the son of King Naemul and Lady Boban, who was the daughter of King Michu.

== Reign ==
Nulji married the daughter of King Silseong of Silla, who nonetheless exiled Nulji's younger brothers as hostages to Goguryeo of northern Korea and as diplomats and influential architects to Wa of Japan. Silseong also plotted to have Nulji killed, but with Goguryeo's aid, Nulji was able to kill Silseong in 417, after which he ascended to the throne.

In 418 Nulji sent a loyal retainer named Bak Je-sang to rescue his brothers from Goguryeo and Wa. He was successful in retrieving the brother who was held in Goguryeo, but he was captured while trying to rescue the one held by Wa. Refusing to serve the Wa king, he died under torture. The story of Bak's loyalty has endured as a popular Korean morality tale.

After these difficult events, Nulji worked to free Silla from Goguryeo domination. He set up diplomatic relations with Goguryeo on an equal footing in 424, and established a military alliance with Baekje in 433 to help counter the Goguryeo threat, called the Baekje-Silla alliance (나제동맹; 羅濟同盟)

Nulji's reign saw the continuation of a long process of centralization in Silla, marked his father's change of his title to "maripgan" (마립간; 麻立干), which is believed to represent a higher level of authority than the previous title "isageum" (이사금; 尼師今), although evidence suggests that maripgan was already used by Naemul.

Under Nulji's rule, patrilineal succession was officially established. According to historical sources, Nulji introduced ox-driven carriages to farming in 438. The Samguk yusa legendarium mentions that during his reign a Goguryeo monk named Mokhoja (묵호자) arrived to Silla and introduced people to buddhism.

After his death in 458, he was succeeded by his son Jabi, rather than by his brother.

== Family ==
- Grandfather: Kim Mal-gu (김말구), brother of King Michu.
- Grandmother: Lady Hyurye ( 휴례부인 김씨), of the Kim clan
- Father: King Naemul
- Mother: Lady Boban, the daughter of King Michu
- Wife: Lady Aro, of the Kim clan (아로부인 김씨), daughter of King Silseong
  - Son: Jabi of Silla (r. 458–479, died 479)–was the 20th ruler of Silla
  - Daughter: Lady Josaeng, of the Kim clan (조생부인)
    - Son-in-law: Galmunwang Seupbo
      - Grandson: Jijeung of Silla (437–514) – was the 22nd ruler of Silla
      - Granddaughter: Lady Seonhye (선혜부인), of the Kim clan (왕후김씨)

== See also ==
- List of Korean monarchs
- Korean history
- Silla

Nulji of Silla House of Kim Died: 458
Regnal titles
Preceded by Silseong	Ruler of Silla; 417–458	Succeeded by Jabi
