= Munseong of Silla =

46th monarch of Silla (r. 839–857)

Munseong 문성 文聖

King of Silla
- Reign: 839–857
- Predecessor: Sinmu of Silla
- Successor: Heonan of Silla
- Born: Unknown
- Died: 857; Silla
- Issue: Heonan of Silla (adopted)
- House: House of Kim
- Father: Sinmu of Silla
- Mother: Lady Jeonggye

- Munseong of Silla
- Hangul: 김경응
- Hanja: 金慶膺
- RR: Gim Gyeongeung
- MR: Kim Kyŏngŭng

Monarch name
- Hangul: 문성왕
- Hanja: 文聖王
- RR: Munseongwang
- MR: Munsŏngwang

Munseong (died 857), personal name Kim Kyŏng-ŭng, was the 46th ruler of the Korean kingdom of Silla. He was the eldest son of King Sinmu and Lady Jeonggye.

Munseong's reign was typical of late Unified Silla, with rampant strife and uprisings. Examples include the 841 rebellion of Hong Pil, the 846 rebellion of Chang Pogo (after he failed to marry his daughter into the royal line), as well as the treason of Kim Sik in 849.

The earlier part of his reign was marked by relatively active trade and commerce with both Japan and Tang China. This was due to Chang Pogo's role in securing the major shipping routes.

Upon his death in 857, King Munseong was buried in the Gongjakji tomb precinct in Gyeongju. He was succeeded by his uncle Heonan.

== Family ==
Parents

- Father: Sinmu of Silla (died 839)
  - Grandfather: Prince Hyechung (혜충태자)
  - Grandmother: Queen Mother Seongmok of the Gyeongju Kim clan (성목태후 김씨)
- Mother: Lady Jeonggye (정계부인)

Consorts and their respective issue:

- Queen Somyeong of the Kim clan (소명왕후); daughter of Kim Kyun-jŏng (김균정; 金均貞)
  - Adopted Son: King Heonan –He was the younger half-brother of King Sinmu.
- Lady Heunmyeong (흔명부인)
  - Son: Kim An (김안)

== See also ==
- List of Korean monarchs
- List of Silla people
- Unified Silla

Munseong of Silla House of Kim Died: 857
Regnal titles
| Preceded by Sinmu | King of Silla; Silla; 839–857 | Succeeded by Heonan |
