= Ilseong of Silla =

King of Silla from 134 to 154

King Ilseong 일성 이사금 逸聖尼師今
- Isageum

Ruler of Silla
- Reign: 134-154
- Coronation: 134
- Predecessor: Jima
- Successor: Adalla
- Died: 154; Silla
- Father: Yuri?
- Mother: unnamed queen

Korean name
- Hangul: 일성 이사금
- Hanja: 逸聖尼師今
- RR: Ilseong isageum
- MR: Ilsŏng isagŭm

Ilseong (died 154, r. 134–154) was the seventh ruler of Silla, one of the Three Kingdoms of Korea. He is commonly called Ilseong Isageum, isageum being the royal title in early Silla. As a descendant of Silla's founder Hyeokgeose, his surname was Bak.

== Background ==
Reports differ as to whether he was the eldest son of King Yuri, or perhaps a more distant relative. Modern scholars believe he was likely the grandson of Yuri, and his father was Prince Ado. He married a princess of the Bak clan. and he was an older brother of Pasa

== Reign ==
He created bureaucratic offices and built a central administrative building. He ordered the cultivation of new agricultural fields.

He is primarily remembered for his 144 edict banning the use of jewelry and other luxury goods by the populace.

During his reign there were several invasions by the northern Malgal tribes. In 146, he suppressed a rebellion by a tributary state in present-day Gyeongsan, North Gyeongsang Province.

The tomb of King Ilseong is located in Tap-dong, central Gyeongju.

== Family ==
- Grandfather: King Namhae of Silla (남해)
- Grandmother: Lady Unje (알영부인)
- Father: Yuri Isageum (유리 이사금), according to Samguk sagi, although the same record also mentions the possibility of Ilseong being the son of Ilji Galmunwang. Historians think the actual father could have been Prince Ado, a son of Yuri.
- Mother: unnamed queen
- Wife:
  - Queen Park, of the Park clan (모후 박씨) daughter of Jisorye Wang (지소례왕)
    - Adalla of Silla (아달라 이사금, d. 184), 1st son

== See also ==
- Three Kingdoms of Korea
- Rulers of Korea
- History of Korea
- Amenohiboko

Ilseong of Silla House of Park Died: 154
Regnal titles
Preceded by Jima	Ruler of Silla; 134–154	Succeeded by Adalla
