= Jima of Silla =

King of Silla from 112 to 134

Jima
- Isageum

Ruler of Silla
- Reign: 112-134
- Coronation: 112
- Predecessor: Pasa of Silla
- Successor: Ilseong of Silla
- Born: Unknown
- Died: 134; Silla
- Father: Pasa of Silla
- Mother: Queen Saseong

Korean name
- Hangul: 지마 이사금
- Hanja: 祇摩泥師今
- RR: Jima isageum
- MR: Chima isagŭm

Jima (died 134, r. 112–134) was the sixth ruler of Silla, one of the Three Kingdoms of Korea. He is commonly called Jima Isageum, isageum being the royal title in early Silla. As a descendant of Silla's founder Hyeokgeose, his surname was Bak.

== Background ==
Jima was the eldest son of the previous king, Pasa Isageum, and Lady Saseong. He married Lady Aerye, of the Kim clan.

== Reign ==
Relations with Baekje, another of the Three Kingdoms, were peaceful during his reign, with the continuation of a truce established by Jima's predecessor Pasa. When the Malgal attacked from the north in 125, Jima requested aid from Baekje, and Giru sent an army to successfully repel the invaders.

Relations with neighboring Gaya confederacy were also peaceful, after Jima's unsuccessful invasion attempts across the Nakdong River in 115 and 116.

In 123, he established relations with the Japanese kingdom of Wa.

Jima died without a male heir to the throne.

== Family ==
- Grandfather: Yuri Isageum
- Grandmother: Queen Kim, of the Kim clan (부인딸 김씨)
- Father: Pasa of Silla
- Mother: Queen Saseong of the Kim clan (사성부인 김씨)
- Wife:
  - Queen Aerye of the Kim clan (애례부인 김씨), daughter of Maje Galmunwang (갈문왕 마제)
    - Princess Naerye (내례부인), 1st daughter
      - married Adalla of Silla and did not have issue
    - Bak Ah-do, Addo Galmunwang (아도 갈문왕), 2nd son

== See also ==
- Proto–Three Kingdoms of Korea
- Three Kingdoms of Korea
- History of Korea
- Rulers of Korea

Jima of Silla House of Park Died: 134
Regnal titles
Preceded by Pasa	Ruler of Silla; 112–134	Succeeded by Ilseong
