= Samguk sagi =

12th century Korean historical record

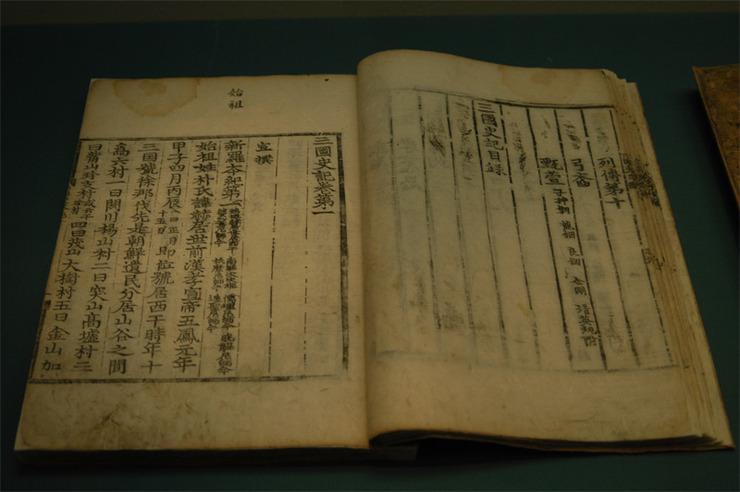
- Author: Kim Pusik
- Original title: 삼국사기 (三國史記)
- Language: Classical Chinese
- Subject: History of Korea
- Genre: Ancient history
- Publication date: 4 February 1146
- Publication place: Goryeo

Korean name
- Hangul: 삼국사기
- Hanja: 三國史記
- Lit.: History of the Three Kingdoms
- RR: Samguk sagi
- MR: Samguk sagi

Samguk sagi (Korean: 삼국사기; Hanja: 三國史記; lit. 'History of the Three Kingdoms') is a historical record of the Three Kingdoms of Korea: Goguryeo, Baekje, and Silla. This copy is significant in that it was the first book ever to be compiled by a Korean government. Completed in 1145, it is well-known in Korea as the oldest surviving chronicle of Korean history.

The Samguk sagi is written in Classical Chinese, the written language of the literati of ancient Korea. Its compilation was ordered by King Injong of Goryeo (r. 1122–1146) and undertaken by a government official and historian named Kim Pusik with his team of junior scholars. The document has been digitized by the National Institute of Korean History and is available online with Modern Korean translation in Hangul.

== Description ==
Samguk sagi is critical to the study of Korean history during the Three Kingdoms and Unified Silla periods. Not only because this work, and its Buddhist counterpart Samguk yusa, are the only remaining Korean sources for the period, but also because the Samguk sagi contains a large amount of information and details. For example, the translation tables given in Books 35 and 36 have been used for a tentative reconstruction of the former Goguryeo language.

=== Background ===
There were various motivating factors behind the compilation of the Samguk sagi in the 12th century. These may roughly be categorized as ideological and political. The ideological factors are made manifest in the work's preface, written by Kim Busik, where the civil historian states,

"Of today's scholars and high-ranking officials, there are those who are well-versed and can discuss in detail the Five Classics and the other philosophical treatises... as well as the histories of Qin and Han, but as to the events of our country, they are utterly ignorant from beginning to end. This is truly lamentable."

=== Sources for the text ===
The Samguk sagi was written on the basis of the Gu Samguksa (舊三國史, Old History of the Three Kingdoms), and other earlier historical records such as the Hwarang Segi (花郞世記, Annals of Hwarang), most of which are no longer extant.

Concerning external sources, no references are made to the Japanese chronicles, like the Kojiki (712) or the Nihon Shoki (720), chronicles of Japan. It is possible Kim Busik was ignorant of them or scorned to quote a Japanese source. In contrast, he lifts generously from the Chinese dynastic chronicles and even unofficial Chinese records, most prominently the Records of the Three Kingdoms (280–290), Book of Wei (554), Book of Jin (648), Old Book of Tang (945), New Book of Tang (1060), and the Zizhi Tongjian (1084).

== Contents ==
The Samguk sagi is divided into 50 books. Originally, each of them was written on a scroll (권; 卷). They are listed as follows:

=== Silla's Records ===
12 scrolls, Nagi/Silla bongi, 나기/신라 본기, 羅紀/新羅本紀.

Book 01. Geoseogan Hyeokgeose, Chachaung Namhae, Isageum Yuri, Talhae, Pasa, Jima, Ilseong
Book 02. Isageum Adalla, Beolhyu, Naehae, Jobun, Cheomhae, Michu, Yurye, Girim, Heulhae
Book 03. Isageum Naemul, Silseong, Maripgan Nulji, Jabi, Soji
Book 04. Maripgan Jijeung, King Beopheung, Jinheung, Jinji, Jinpyeong
Book 05. Queen Seondeok, Jindeok, King Taejong Muyeol
Book 06. King Munmu - Part One
Book 07. King Munmu - Part Two
Book 08. King Sinmun, Hyoso, Seongdeok
Book 09. King Hyoseong, Gyeongdeok, Hyegong, Seondeok
Book 10. King Wonseong, Soseong, Aejang, Heondeok, Heungdeok, Huigang, Minae, Sinmu
Book 11. King Munseong, Heonan, Gyeongmun, Heongang, Jeonggang, Queen Jinseong
Book 12. King Hyogong, Sindeok, Gyeongmyeong, Gyeongae, Gyeongsun

=== Goguryeo's Records ===
10 scrolls, Yeogi/Goguryeo bongi, 여기/고구려 본기, 麗紀/高句麗本紀.

Book 13. Sage King Dongmyeong, Bright King Yuri,
Book 14. King Daemusin, Minjung, Mobon,
Book 15. Great King Taejo, King Chadae
Book 16. King Sindae, Gogukcheon, Sansang
Book 17. King Dongcheon, Jungcheon, Seocheon, Bongsang, Micheon
Book 18. King Gogukwon, Sosurim, Gogugyang, Gwanggaeto, Jangsu,
Book 19. Illustrious King Munja, King Anjang, Anwon, Yangwon, Pyeongwon,
Book 20. King Yeongyang, Yeongnyu
Book 21. King Bojang - Part One
Book 22. King Bojang - Part Two

=== Baekje's Records ===
6 scrolls, Jegi/Baekje bongi, 제기/백제 본기, 濟紀/百濟本紀.

Book 23. King Onjo (Dynastic Founder), Daru, Giru, Gaeru, Chogo
Book 24. King Gusu, Saban, Goi, Chaekgye, Bunseo, Biryu, Gye, Geunchogo, Geungusu, Chimnyu
Book 25. King Jinsa, Asin, Jeonji, Guisin, Biyu, Gaero
Book 26. King Munju, Samgeun, Dongseong, Muryeong, Seong
Book 27. King Wideok, Hye, Beop, Mu
Book 28. King Uija

=== Chronological Tables ===
3 scrolls, Yeonpyo, 연표, 年表.

Book 29.
Book 30.
Book 31.

=== Monographs ===
9 scrolls, Ji, 지, 志.

Book 32. Rites and music
Book 33. Vehicles, clothing, and dwellings
Book 34. Geography of Silla (1)
Book 35. Geography of Silla (2): Former territory of Goguryeo
Book 36. Geography of Silla (3): Former territory of Baekje
Book 37. Geography of Goguryeo and Baekje
Book 38. Silla government offices.
Book 39. Silla government offices.
Book 40. Silla government offices.

=== Biographies ===
10 scrolls, Yeoljeon, 열전, 列傳.

Book 41. Kim Yusin (1)
Book 42. Kim Yusin (2)
Book 43. Kim Yusin (3)

Book 44. Ŭlchi Mundŏk 을지문덕, Geochilbu 김거칠부, Geodo 거도, Yi Sabu 이사부, Kim Immun 김인문, Kim Yang 김양, Heukchi Sangji 흑치상지, Chang Pogo 장보고, Jeong Nyeon 정년, Prince Sadaham 사다함공

Book 45. Ŭl P'aso 을파소, Kim Hujik 김후직, [nog zhēn] 祿真, Milu 밀우, Nyuyu 유유 纽由, Myeongnim Dap-bu 명림답부, Seok Uro 석우로, Park Jesang 박제상, Gwisan 귀산, Ondal 온달

Book 46. Scholars. Kangsu 강수, Ch'oe Ch'iwŏn, Seol Chong

Book 47. Hwarangs. Haenon 해론, Sona 소나, Chwido 취도(驟徒), Nulchoi 눌최, Seol Gyedu 설계두, Kim Ryeong-yun 김영윤(金令胤), Gwanchang 관창, Kim Heum-un 김흠운, Yeolgi 열기(裂起), Binyeongja 비령자(丕寧子), Jukjuk 죽죽, Pilbu 필부(匹夫), Gyebaek 계백

Book 48. Meritorious. Hyangdeok (son), Seonggak (son), Silhye 실혜 (實兮) (poet), Mulgyeja 물계자 (soldier), Teacher Baekgyeol 백결 선생 (music), Prince Kim 검군, Kim Saeng 김생 (calligrapher) and Yo Gukil, Solgeo 솔거 (painter), Chiun (daughter), Seolssi (daughter), Domi (wife).

Book 49. Overthrows. Ch'ang Chori 창조리, Yŏn Kaesomun 연개소문

Book 50. Later Kings. Kung Ye 궁예, Kyŏn Hwŏn 견훤

== Translations in Western languages ==
Portions of the work have appeared in various English language books and articles, notably:

Translation of the whole Silla bongi

- Shultz, Edward J.; Kang, Hugh H.W.; Kane, Daniel C. (2012). 'The Silla Annals of the Samguk Sagi. Seongnam-si: The Academy of Korean Studies Press. p. 468. ISBN 978-8971058602.

Translation of the whole Goguryeo bongi

- Shultz, Edward J.; Kang, Hugh H.W.; Kane, Daniel C.; Gardiner, Kenneth H.J. (2011). 'The Koguryo Annals of the Samguk Sagi. Seongnam-si: The Academy of Korean Studies Press. p. 300. ISBN 9788971057919.

Translation of the whole Baekje bongji

- Best, Jonathan (2007). A History of the Early Korean Kingdom of Paekche [Baekje], together with an annotated translation of The Paekche Annals of the Samguk Sagi. Harvard East Asian Monographs. Vol. 256. Harvard University Asia Center. p. 555. ISBN 978-0674019577.

Isolated translations

- Byington, Mark E. (1992). "Samguk Sagi Volume 48 Biographies Book 8" (PDF). Transactions of the Korea Branch, Royal Asiatic Society. 67: 71–81. Archived from the original (PDF) on 2018-10-05.
- Gardiner, Kenneth H.J. 1982. "Legends of Koguryŏ (I-II): Samguk Sagi, Annals of Koguryŏ." Korea Journal, 22(1): 60-69 and 22(2): 31-48. [translation of book one of the Goguryeo bongi].
- Jamieson, John Charles. 1969. "The Samguk Sagi and the Unification Wars." Ph.D. dissertation, University of California, Berkeley. [Translation of books 6 and 7 of the Silla bongi and eleven of the biographies, mostly of men of Silla].
- Lee, Soyun, and Shin Jeongsoo. 2018. "Chapters 44 and 45 of the 'Samguk Sagi': An Annotated Translation of Biography [sic] of Eulji Mundeok and Others." The Review of Korean Studies, 21(2): 165-145. [translations of books 44 and 45 of the biographies section].
- Na, Sanghoon, You Jinsook, and Shin Jeongsoo. 2018. "Chapter 41, 42 and 43 of the Samguk Sagi: An Annotated Translation of [sic] Biography of Kim Yusin." The Review of Korean Studies, 21(1): 191-262.

== See also ==
- Goryeosa
- List of monarchs of Korea
- Placename glosses in the Samguk sagi
- Samguk yusa
- Veritable Records of the Joseon Dynasty
