= Silseong of Silla =

King of Silla from 402 to 417

King Silseong 실성 마립간 實聖 麻立干
- Maripgan

Ruler of Silla
- Reign: 402-417
- Coronation: 402
- Predecessor: Naemul of Silla
- Successor: Nulji of Silla
- Born: Unknown
- Died: 417; Silla
Posthumous name
- King Silseong (실성 마립간; 實聖 麻立干)
- Father: Kim Daeseoji
- Mother: Lady Yiri/Yesaeng

- Silseong of Silla
- Hangul: 실성 마립간
- Hanja: 實聖 麻立干
- RR: Silseong maripgan
- MR: Silsŏng maripkan

Silseong (died 417) (r. 402–417), whose name is also given as Silju or Silgeum, was the 18th ruler of the Korean kingdom of Silla. He was the son of the general (gakgan) Kim Daeseoji, who was the younger brother of King Michu. His title is given as Maripgan in the Samguk yusa, and as Isageum in the Samguk sagi.

== Reign ==
As a child in 392, Silseong was sent to Goguryeo as a hostage. He did not return to Silla until 401. In the following year, the reigning King Naemul died. Because Naemul's sons were still young, the nobles of the kingdom placed Silseong on the throne. Historians theorise that in reality he was possibly crowned due to political pressure from Goguryeo.

After being crowned in 402, Silseong established an alliance with Wa and sent Naemul's son Kim Misaheun there as a hostage. Despite this, he waged multiple wars with the Wa during his reign, as the islanders attacked Silla. In 412, he sent another son of Naemul, Kim Bokho, to Goguryeo as a hostage. He tried to have Naemul's eldest son, Kim Nulji killed by Goguryeo agents, but the plan fell through and the neighbouring state helped Nulji stage a coup and kill Silseong. During the coup, Silseong's entire maternal Seok lineage was wiped out.

His daughter Aro married Nulji, who ascended the throne in 417.

== Family ==
- Uncle: King Michu
- Father: Kim Daeseoji, the younger brother of King Michu (김대서지)
- Mother: Lady Iri or Yesaeng, of the Seok clan (이리부인 석씨 / 예생부인), daughter of Seok Deung-Ya or Deungbo (석등야/석등보)
- Wife:
  - Queen Aryu, of the Kim clan (아류부인 김씨), daughter of King Michu
    - Daughter: Lady Aro, of the Kim clan (아로부인 김씨) married Nulji of Silla
    - Daughter: Lady Chisul, of the Kim clan (치술공주 김씨), married Park Je-sang (박제상)

== See also ==
- Three Kingdoms of Korea
- List of Korean monarchs
- List of Silla people

Silseong of Silla House of Kim Died: 417
Regnal titles
Preceded by Naemul	Ruler of Silla; 402–417	Succeeded by Nulji
