= Isabu =

Silla general (fl. 6th century)

- Hangul: 이사부
- Hanja: 異斯夫
- RR: Isabu
- MR: Isabu

Isabu (Korean: 이사부; Hanja: 異斯夫) was a military general and politician of Silla during the 6th century. According to Samguk sagi, he is the fourth generation descendant of Naemul of Silla. He was also known as Taejong. He is best remembered today for his role in subjugating the island nation of Usan-guk. Usan-guk is the modern-day Ulleungdo, an island located in the Sea of Japan. There is a dispute regarding his surname, as his family name is written as Kim in the Samguk sagi. He was the 4th generation descendant of King Naemul, which also provides direct proof that his family name was Kim. In Samguk yusa, his name was instead recorded as Pak I-jong (박이종; 朴伊宗).

== Achievement ==
During the reign of Jijeung, Isabu was first appointed as the governor (kunju) of Siljik province (실직주), modern-day Samcheok. Then, he was appointed as a governor of Haseulla, which is modern-day Gangwon. This was when Silla, including its inland regions, was frequently exposed to the piracy of Usan-guk's people. Due to the harsh geographical condition of Usan-guk, people of Usan-guk believed that Silla would not invade its island.

Still, Isabu decided to subjugate this island nation. However, such tough geographical condition was not the only obstacle. As Usan-guk is an island nation composed of independent tribes that rely on fishing for living, the people of Usan-guk turned out to be somewhat uncontrollable and aggressive and thus hard to conquer. In order to overcome such obstacles and conquer this island nation, Isabu came up with an idea to trick people of Usan-guk into surrendering. He made large wooden lions and loaded them on battle ships. He threatened the people of Usan-guk, saying that he would release the lions if they didn't surrender. Eventually, his trick worked and the people of Usan-guk surrendered. Thanks to Isabu, Usan-guk was subjugated to Silla in 512.

Isabu further expanded Silla's territory after gaining supreme military power in 541, as far as former Baekje and Goguryeo territory that reached far north of present-day Hamgyong. Isabu also subjugated Daegaya that put an end to the Gaya confederacy and thus, consolidated Silla's power on southeastern part of Korea.

== Research ship ==
A flagship research ship of South Korea, Isabu, is named after him. Due to its name, researchers at Japan's National Marimte Research Institute agency have been instructed by the Japanese government not to participate in any collaborations or cruises involving the ship.

== Popular culture ==
- Portrayed by Park Seo-joon in the 2016–2017 KBS2 TV series Hwarang: The Poet Warrior Youth.

== See also ==
- Military history of Korea
- Three Kingdoms of Korea
