= Gyerim =

Woodland in Gyeongju, South Korea

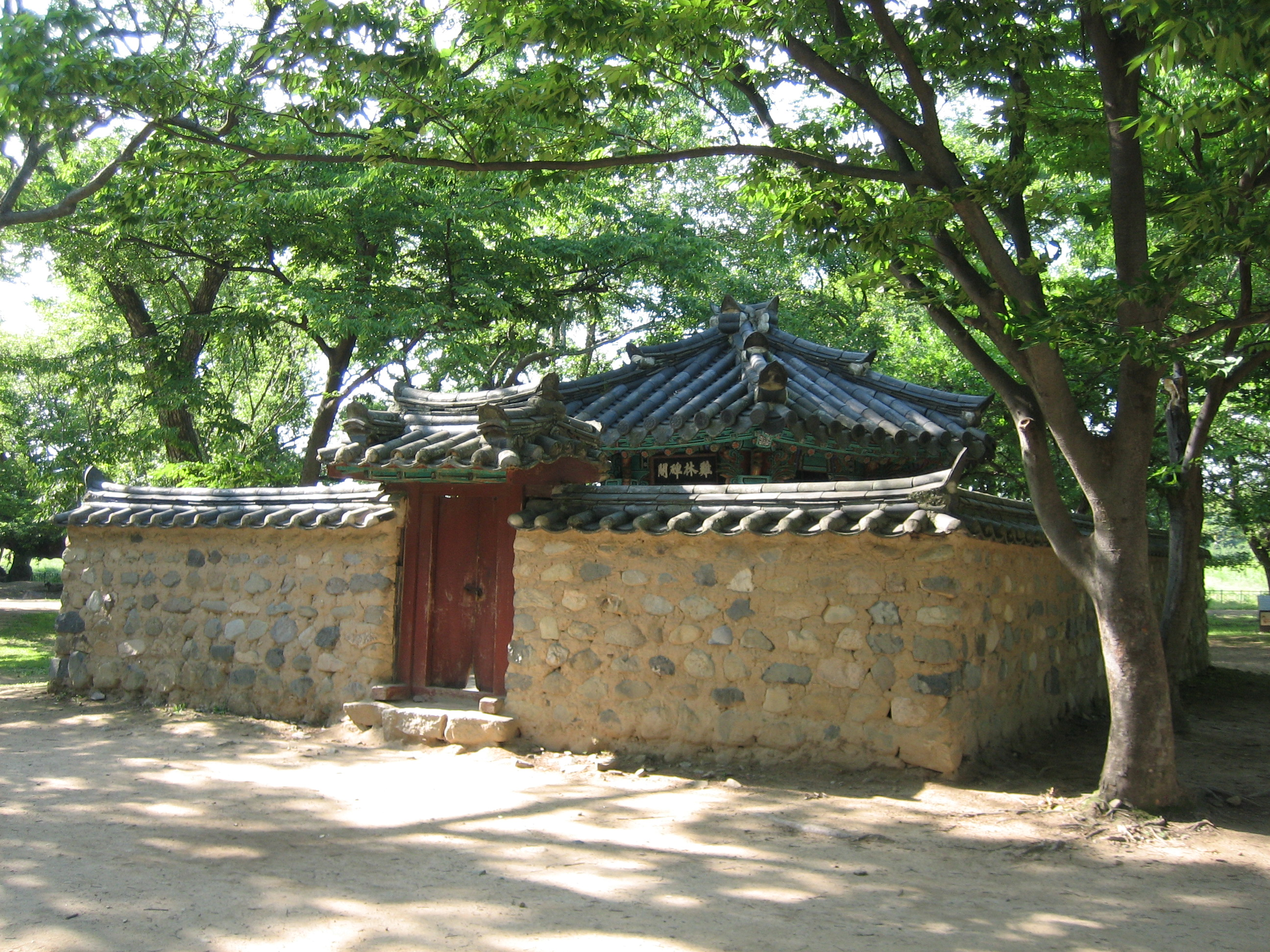
- Shrine in Gyerim (2009)
- Interactive map of Gyerim
- 35.8675°N 129.2230°E
- Type: Woodland
- Location: Gyeongju, South Korea

UNESCO World Heritage Site
- Designated: 2000
- Part of: Gyeongju Historic Areas

Historic Sites of South Korea
- Designated: 1963-01-21
- Reference no.: 19

Korean name
- Hangul: 계림
- Hanja: 鷄林
- RR: Gyerim
- MR: Kyerim

Gyerim (Korean: 계림; Hanja: 鷄林) is a small woodland in Gyeongju, South Korea. The name literally means "rooster forest". The grove lies near the old site of the Silla kingdom palace in central Gyeongju. Nearby landmarks include the Banwolseong fortress, Cheomseongdae, the Gyeongju National Museum, and the Royal Tombs Complex.

== History ==
The original name of Gyerim was Sirim (시림; 始林). However, according to the Samguk Sagi, a 12th-century Korean history, Sirim was the site where the child Kim Al-chi, founder of the Gyeongju Kim clan, was discovered. Found in a golden box accompanied by a rooster, he was adopted by the royal family. His descendants became the later kings of Silla and the forest where he was found was renamed Gyerim, "Rooster Forest." The Samguk yusa, a 13th-century miscellanea of tales relating to the Three Kingdoms of Korea, gives a different origin of the term Gyerim. According to that text, the founder of Silla, Hyeokgeose, was born at a stream called Gyejeong (계정; 鷄井), "rooster well," and that his future consort was born from a dragon that came to earth at another place called Gyeryongseo (계룡서; 鷄龍瑞), and for this reason the area was renamed Gyerim.

However, it is presumed that Kim's Legend related to Gye (계; 鷄) was mixed with the legend of state's founder. Because, The source of these records is a comprehensive record of verbal legends in the 13th century written by Buddhist monks. There is a difference of more than 1000 years from the time when the incident occurred. In the Samguk Sagi, a more reliable history book, Legend related to Gye is mentioned only in Gim Al-ji's part, but not in Hyeokgeose's part.

Based upon the legends of Silla's founding, Gyerim also became a sobriquet for that state. The earliest recorded reference we have of Gyerim being used to designate Silla is from the Chinese histories. The Old Book of Tang records that in 663 Emperor Gaozong of Tang designated Silla the Gyerim Territory Area Command and Munmu of Silla as its commander-in-chief. The early eighth-century Sillan scholar Kim Taemun authored a no longer extant book of tales of Silla entitled Gyerim japjeon (鷄林雜傳).

Gyerim also appears in the title of the early twelfth-century Chinese work Gyerim yusa, which provides one of the earliest sources of information on the pronunciation of the native Korean language.

== Historical landmark ==
Being considered a holy place, a monument commemorating the birth legend of Kim Al-chi was built in 1803 by the Joseon. Gyerim has been designated as historical landmark #19 from the Korean government since January, 1963. The grounds cover 7,300 m^{2} and has a dense forest of old oak, ash, zelkova, willow, Japanese clovers, scarlet maple and Japanese pagoda trees.

== Gallery ==
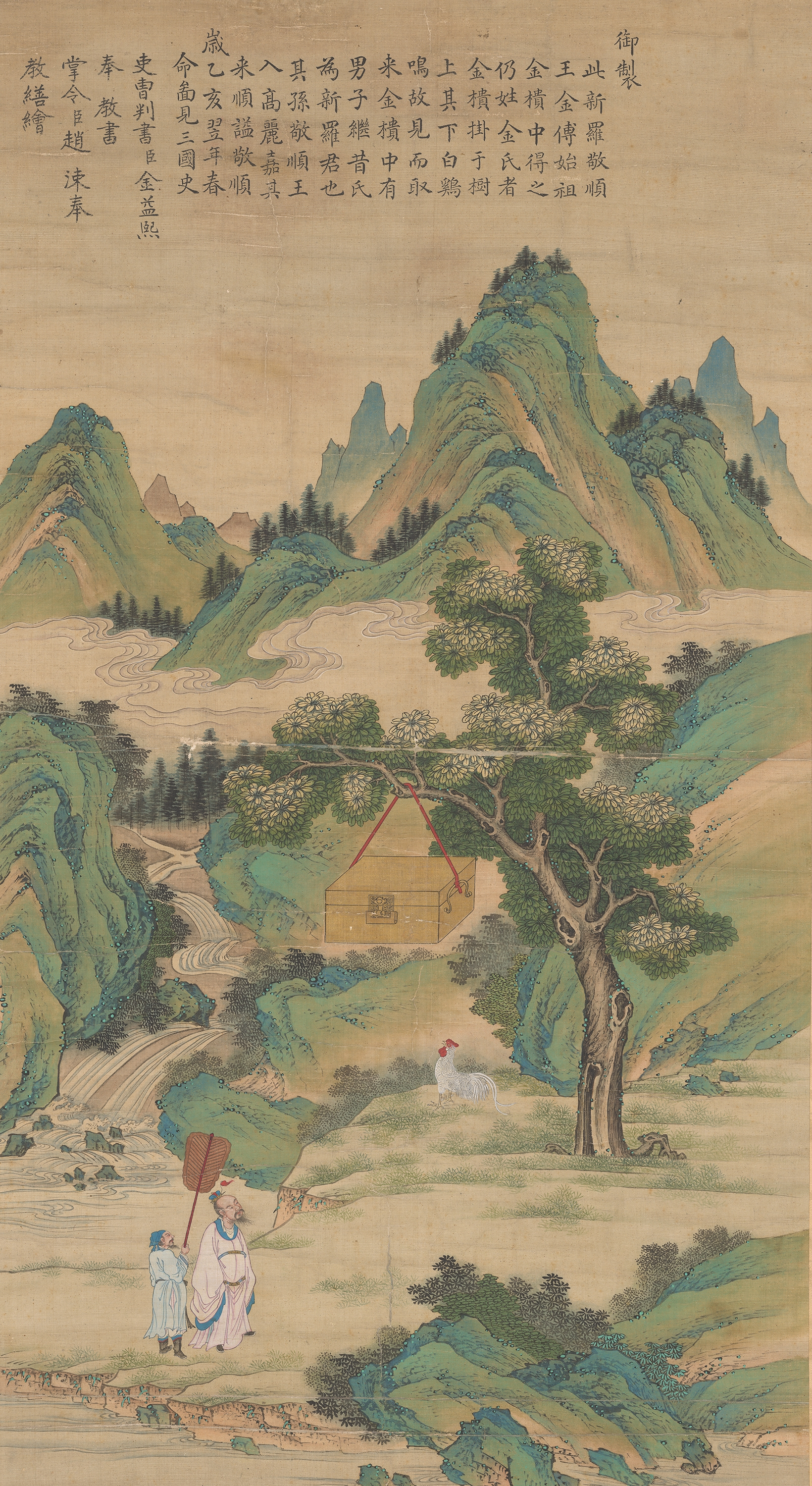
Painting depicting the discovery of Kim Al-chi

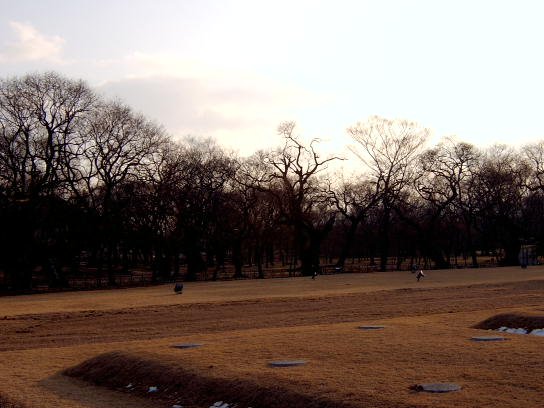
Gyerim forest

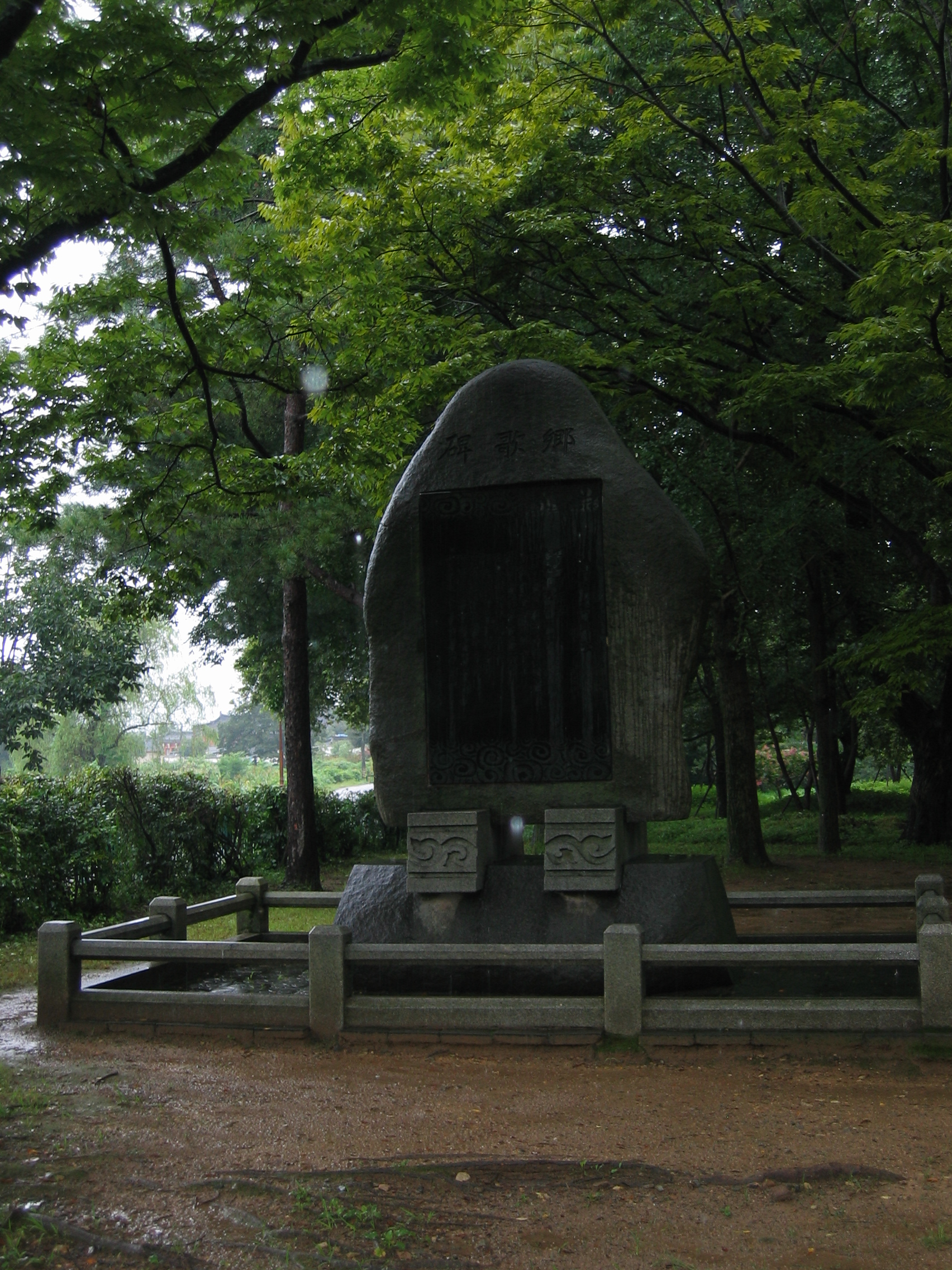
Gyerim Forest Monument

== See also ==
- History of Korea
