= Naehae of Silla =

King of Silla from 196 to 230

King Naehae 내해 이사금 奈解尼師今
- Isageum

Ruler of Silla
- Reign: 196-230
- Coronation: 196
- Predecessor: Beolhyu of Silla
- Successor: Jobun of Silla
- Born: Unknown
- Died: 230; Silla
Posthumous name
- King Naehae (내해 이사금; 奈解尼師今)
- Father: Seok Imae
- Mother: Queen Naerye

- Naehae of Silla
- Hangul: 내해 이사금
- Hanja: 奈解尼師今
- RR: Naehae isageum
- MR: Naehae isagŭm

Naehae (died 230, r. 196–230) was the tenth king of Silla, one of the Three Kingdoms of Korea. He is commonly called Naehae Isageum, isageum being the royal title in early Silla. As a descendant of Silla's 4th king Talhae, his surname was Seok.

== Background ==
He was the grandson of the previous ruler, Beolhyu Isageum. Beolhyu's crown prince Goljeong and second son Imae died early, and Goljeong's son Jobun was too young. Naehae was the son of Seok Imae and Lady Naerye.

Naehe married a cousin, the daughter of Goljeong. His queen's younger brother Jobun became the next king and married Naehe's daughter Aihye. In both cases, these were consanguine marriages.

== Reign ==
During his reign, the Samguk sagi reports cordial relations with the neighboring Gaya Confederacy, and repeated clashes with the rival kingdom Baekje.

Baekje invaded in 199 and 214; Silla responded by conquering Baekje's Sahyeon castle. Naehae personally led the successful defense to Baekje's next attack in 218. Mohe invaded and defeat in 203, In 212, Gaya sent the prince to Silla as a hostage.

During the Posang Eight States War (浦上八國 亂; 209–212) Seok Uro, son of Naehae of Silla and son-in-law of Jobun of Silla, was first active as a general.

== Family ==
- Grandfather: Beolhyu of Silla (벌휴 이사금)
- Grandmother: Queen, of the Kim clan (김씨), niece of Kim Alji
- Father: Seok Imae (석이매)
- Mother: Lady Naerye
- Spouse:
  - Unnamed queen of the Seok Clan (석부인 석씨), daughter of Galmunwang Seok Goljeong (석골정), his 1st cousin
    - Princess Aihye (아이혜부인), 1st daughter
      - married Jobun of Silla
    - Seok Uro (석우로), 1st son
      - married Lady Myeongwon, of the Seok clan (명원부인 석씨), daughter of Jobun of Silla
        - Issue: Heulhae of Silla, the 16th King of Silla
    - Seok Yieum (석이음), or Nareum (날음) 2nd son (? − 220)<ref name="doo" / >

== See also ==
- Three Kingdoms of Korea
- Rulers of Korea
- History of Korea

Naehae of Silla House of Seok Died: 230
Regnal titles
Preceded by Beolhyu	Ruler of Silla; 196–230	Succeeded by Jobun
