= Kim Al-chi =

1st-century CE Korean historical figure

- Hangul: 김알지
- Hanja: 金閼智
- RR: Gim Alji
- MR: Kim Alchi

Kim Al-chi (Korean: 김알지; Hanja: 金閼智; unknown–?), was a historical figure in Korean history. His descendants formed the Kim royal clan of Silla, one of the Three Kingdoms of Korea.

His legendary birth is said to have occurred during the reign of Silla's fourth ruler, King Talhae of Silla. Though Kim Al-chi never ruled as the King of Silla, his descendants did. Today, 1.8 million South Koreans are in the Gyeongju Kim clan, who trace their genealogy to Kim Al-chi.

== Birth legend ==
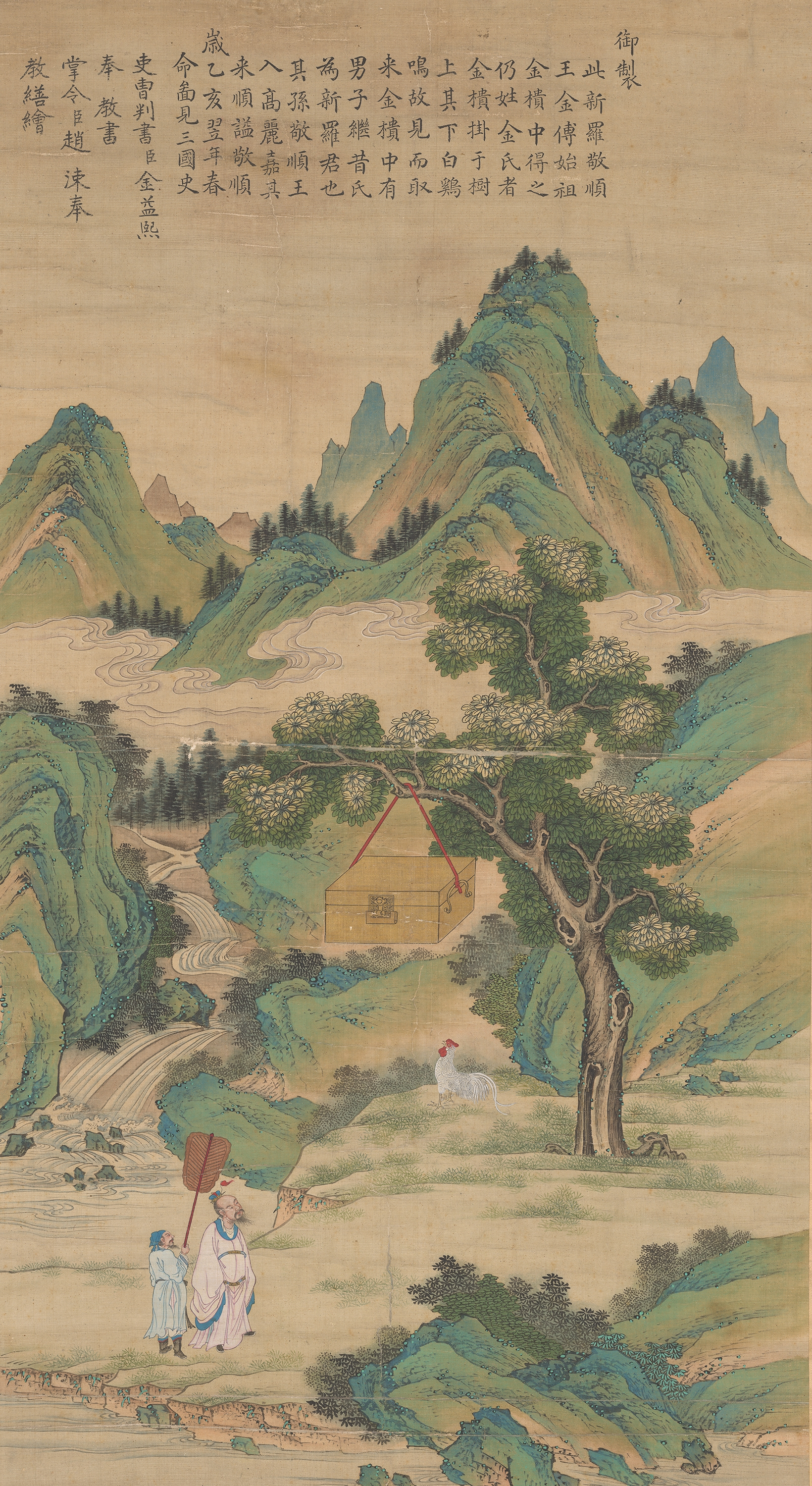
Painting depicting the discovery of Kim Al-chi

The Samguk Yusa and Samguk Sagi both contain nearly the same story about Kim Al-chi's birth.

In the year 65 (9th year of Talhae's reign), King Talhae heard a rooster crowing in Sirim, west of Geumseong (Gyeongju, the Silla capital at the time). He sent his minister, Hogong, who was from Japan, to investigate, whereupon Hogong found a golden box hanging on a branch. Light was emanating from the box, and a white rooster was crowing under it.

Hearing this report, the king ordered the box brought to him. When the king opened the box, there was an infant inside. The king was very pleased and adopted him. Because he was born from a golden box and was very clever, the king named him "Kim (金, meaning gold) Al-chi(Alti) (meaning 'gold' in native Korean, with the hanja 閼智 supposed to be read phonetically)". The forest where the box was found was named Gyerim (rooster forest), which also was used as the name of Silla. This legend is similar to the birth legend of the founder of Silla, Bak Hyeokgeose of Silla (who is said to have called himself Alji Geoseokhan). Korean archeologist, Kim Byong-mo, has suggested that the Kim Al-chi(Alti) may have been the chief of a "gold" (altin) clan of northern Korea/Manchuria.

== Death ==
The circumstances and time of his death are currently unknown and cannot be precisely located within any records, but it is known that his descendants continued to serve as powerful officials within the Silla court until the time came when they took power.

== Royal Kim clan ==
Kim's son was Sehan (세한(勢漢)), and subsequent generations are recorded as: Ado (아도(阿都)) - Suryu (수류(首留)) - Ukbo (욱보(郁甫)) - Gudo (구도(俱道)). Gudo's son (Kim Al-chi's seventh generation descendant) was the first Silla king of the Kim line, Michu of Silla. Sehan usually considered as the same one with Kim Sŏng-han, who was described as a Taejo of Silla from 6th century.

== See also ==
- Michu of Silla
- Gyeongju Kim

== Sources ==
- 三國史記 (in Chinese)
