= Talhae of Silla =

King of Silla from 57 to 80

King Talhae 탈해 이사금 脫解尼師今
- Isageum
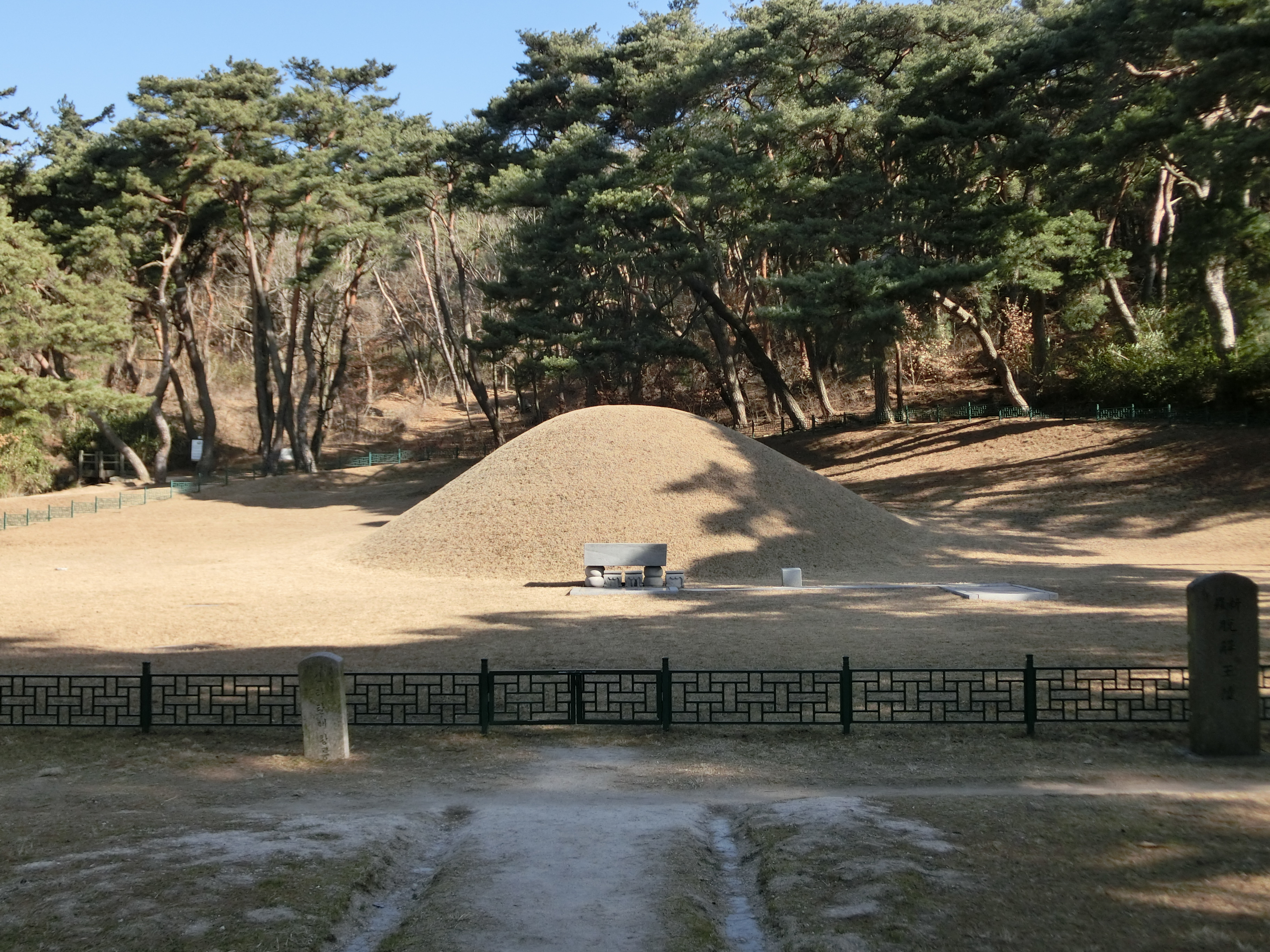
- Tomb of King Talhae

Ruler of Silla
- Reign: 57-80
- Coronation: 57
- Predecessor: Yuri of Silla
- Successor: Pasa of Silla
- Born: Unknown
- Died: 80; Silla
Posthumous name
- King Talhae (탈해 이사금; 脫解尼師今)
- Father: King Hamdalpa
- Mother: Princess of Jeoknyeo-guk

- Talhae of Silla
- Hangul: 탈해 이사금; 토해 이사금
- Hanja: 脫解尼師今; 吐解尼師今
- RR: Talhae isageum; Tohae isageum
- MR: T'arhae isagŭm; T'ohae isagŭm

Talhae (5 BC –80 AD, r. 57–80) was the fourth king of Silla, one of the Three Kingdoms of Korea. He is commonly called Talhae Isageum, isageum being the royal title in early Silla. Also known by his personal name as Seok Talhae (昔脫解).

== Family ==
Parents

- Father: unknown. There are several legends alleging it was the King of Dapana (다파나국, 多婆那國), King Hamdalpa (함달파왕) of Yongseong (용성국, 龍城國), King Hamdal (함달왕) of Wanha (완하국, 琓夏國) or even others.
- Mother: Princess of Jeoknyeo (적녀국의 공주) or Yeo (여국, 女國)

Consorts and their respective issue:

- Queen: Ahyo, of the Park clan (아효부인 박씨), daughter of Namhae of Silla, sister of Yuri Isageum
  - Seok Gu-chu, Crown Prince (태자 석구추)
    - Daughter-in-law: Lady Jijinaerye of the Kim clan (지진내례부인 김씨)
      - Son: Beolhyu of Silla (died 196, r. 184–196)–was the 9th king of Silla

== Background ==
He was the founder of the Gyeongju Seok clan, one of the noble clans that shared the Silla throne during the early Common Era.

He was born in a small kingdom 1000 li^{一} northeast of Wa (Japan). (The name of the kingdom is "Dapana-guk (다파나국; 多婆那國;^{二} Dapana Country)" according to the Samguk sagi, or "Ryongseong-guk (룡성국; 龍城國; Dragon-[Castle/City] Country)", "Jeongmyeong-guk (정명국; 正明國; Proper and Enlightened Country)", "Wanha-guk (완하국; 琓夏國; (A Kind of) Jade Summer Country)", or "Hwaha-guk (화하국; 花厦國; Flower Mansion Country)" according to the Samguk yusa.) His father, King Hamdalpa, was a king of this kingdom; his mother was a queen or princess of another kingdom, called Nyeo-guk 女国 "Woman Country."

According to the Samguk sagi, when he was born as an egg, his father considered it an ill omen and had it boxed and floated at sea. The egg landed east of Gyerim (near today's Gyeongju, South Korea), where he was raised by an old woman as a fisherman. His family is said to have taken over a high official's house by claiming to be metalsmiths.

His birth year is unknown, but he was probably an old man when he assumed the throne, having married the daughter (or younger sister) of King Namhae of Silla in the year 8 AD. He was offered the throne as successor to the second king Namhae, but the older Yuri served as king first. Yuri in turn designated Talhae his successor.

Hogong is chief retainer who served for establishment of Silla. He also discovered Kim Alji who is the founder of Kim clan in Korea. He got involved to three royals who are founder of Silla. He has Japanese origin. Talhae also came over by ship. The location of his birth place Dapana Country is estimated as somewhere in the Japanese archipelago. It is precisely estimated some part in Sea of Japan side or Kyushu. According to Kenichi Kamigaito, as it is a myth, other lines would be mixed, but Talhae of Silla was a King of Tanba province and he made jade there. He reached Silla by following a trade route. Even though excluding details of myth, it can be assumed that clan Seok had trade with Japan.

On the other hand, there is a view that Ryongseong-guk (Korean: 룡성국; Hanja: 龍城國) listed in the Samguk yusa has been regarded as a nation of Ainu, and Talhae has been regarded as a citizen of Ainu.

== Legend ==
According to the book Garakguk-gi, Talhae came to Garakguk through the sea. He willingly went in to the palace and said to the king,

"I'm here to take the position of King of Geumgwan-guk". So the king replied, "The purpose of heaven's appointment of me as king is to stabilize the country and make the people comfortable in the future. I cannot dare to give the throne to others in violation of heaven's orders, nor can I entrust our people to you". Then, Talhae said, "Then are you going to compete with magic(術法)?" So the king agreed. In a flash, when Talhae turned into a hawk, the king turned into an eagle. when Talhae turned into a sparrow, the king turned into a big hawk, and the speed was really fast. When Talhae returned to its original shape, the king also changed to its original shape. Accordingly, Talhae lies prone and surrenders. "When I compete with magic, the hawk does not die from the eagle, and the sparrow does not die from the big hawk because of the good heart that the saint(聖人) hates killing. It will be really difficult for me to fight for the throne with the king". Talhae said farewell to the king and went out to the port through the water route where ships from China were transported. The king hurriedly sent 500 naval vessels to chase them, fearing that he would stay and rebel, and all the naval forces returned because Talhae fled into the land of Gyerim. However, the articles published here are different from those of Silla.

— Samguk yusa

== Reign ==
In 64, the rival Korean kingdom Baekje attacked several times. Silla battled the Gaya confederacy in 77.

According to legend, in 65 the infant Kim Alji, ancestor of the Gyeongju Kim family, was found by Hogong in a golden box in the royal Gyerim forest. Talhae named his kingdom Gyerim at this time (the name Silla was officially adopted much later). There was also a legendary account of Talhae battling King Suro of Gaya, with both utilizing magic by transforming into birds to fight each other.

A tomb believed to be Talhae's is located in northern Gyeongju. The Gyeongju National Museum is constructed on the site where Talhae had a palace built.

== In popular culture ==
- Portrayed by Lee Pil-mo in the 2010 MBC TV series Kim Su-ro, The Iron King.

== See also ==
- Rulers of Korea
- Three Kingdoms of Korea
- History of Korea
- Kim Su-ro, The Iron King

== Notes ==
^一 A li is roughly equivalent to 400–500 meters.

^二 Tanba no kuni was located 460 km northeast of Wakoku.

Talhae of Silla House of Seok Died: 80
Regnal titles
Preceded by Yuri	Ruler of Silla; 57–80	Succeeded by Pasa
