= Naemul of Silla =

King of Silla from 356 to 402

King Naemul 내물 마립간 奈勿麻立干
- Isageum; Maripgan

Ruler of Silla
- Reign: 356-402
- Coronation: 356
- Predecessor: Heulhae of Silla
- Successor: Silseong of Silla
- Born: Unknown
- Died: 402; Silla
Posthumous name
- King Naemul (내물 마립간; 奈勿麻立干)
- Father: Kim Mal-gu
- Mother: Lady Hyulye

- Naemul of Silla
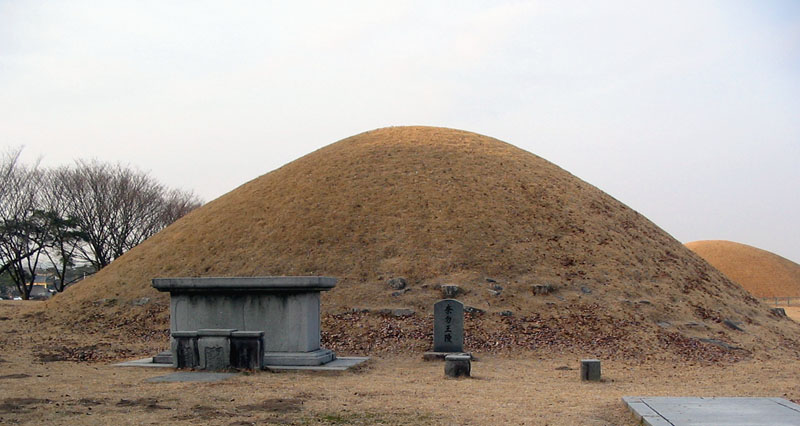
- Tomb of King Namul in the Gyerim forest, Gyo-dong, Gyeongju, South Korea.

Korean name
- Hangul: 내물 이사금; 내물 마립간
- Hanja: 奈勿尼師今; 奈勿麻立干
- RR: Naemul isageum; Naemul maripgan
- MR: Naemul isagŭm; Naemul maripkan

Naemul (died 402) (r. 356–402) was the 17th ruler of the Korean kingdom of Silla. He was the nephew of King Michu. He married Michu's daughter, Lady Boban. He is given the title Isageum, the same one borne by earlier rulers, in the Samguk sagi; he is given the title Maripgan, borne by later rulers, in the Samguk yusa. Since the Chinese Book of Jin also uses the Chinese characters for maripgan when talking about Naemul, it is usually considered that the use of the title began with him. The name can be read Namul or Namil (那密).

== Reign ==
He is the first Silla king to appear by name in the Book of Jin. It appears that there was a great influx of Chinese culture into Silla in his period, and that the widespread use of Chinese characters began in his time. Naemul sent a tribute mission to the king of Early Jin in 381. This envoy, named Widu (衛頭) visited Early Jin with the help of Goguryeo. In response to a question by Fu Jian, Widu stated that the name of country had changed (to Silla).

Naemul's later reign was troubled by recurrent invasions by Wa Japan and the northern Malgal tribes. This began with a massive Japanese incursion in 364, which was repulsed with great loss of life.

- In 392, Silla formed an alliance with Goguryeo by sending Silseong, Nameul's cousin to the neighbouring kingdom.
- In 393, Japan besieged the capital.
- In 394, Silla achieved victory at Doksan (presumed present-day northern Pohang).
- In 395, the Japanese army achieved victory after realizing that the left side of the Silla army was unguarded and attacked intensively until the Silla army was destroyed.
- 400−401, Imna-Japan Allied Forces Attacked Silla and war between Goguryeo-Silla Alliance and Imna-Japan Allied Forces. See also Gwanggaeto Stele.

His reign overlaps with Geunchogo of Baekje and Gwanggaeto the Great. Silla managed to keep Baekje at bay only with the help of Gwanngaeto.

When he died in 402, his sons were too young to rule, thus the throne was given to his cousin, Silseong who returned from Goguryeo.

== Family ==
- Grandfather: Kim Gudo Galmunwang (구도 갈문왕)
- Father: Kim Mal-gu (김말구), half–brother of King Michu.
- Mother: Queen Hyurye ( 휴례부인 김씨), of the Kim clan
- Spouse: Lady Boban (보반부인 김씨) of the Kim clan, eldest daughter of King Michu
  - Son: Nulji of Silla (reigned 417–458) – the 19th King of Silla
  - Son: Kim Bokho (김복호)
  - Son: Kim Misaheun (미사흔)

== See also ==
- Three Kingdoms of Korea
- List of Korean monarchs
- List of Silla people

Naemul of Silla House of Kim Died: 402
Regnal titles
Preceded by Heulhae	Ruler of Silla; 356–402	Succeeded by Silseong
