= Michu of Silla =

King of Silla from 262 to 284

Michu
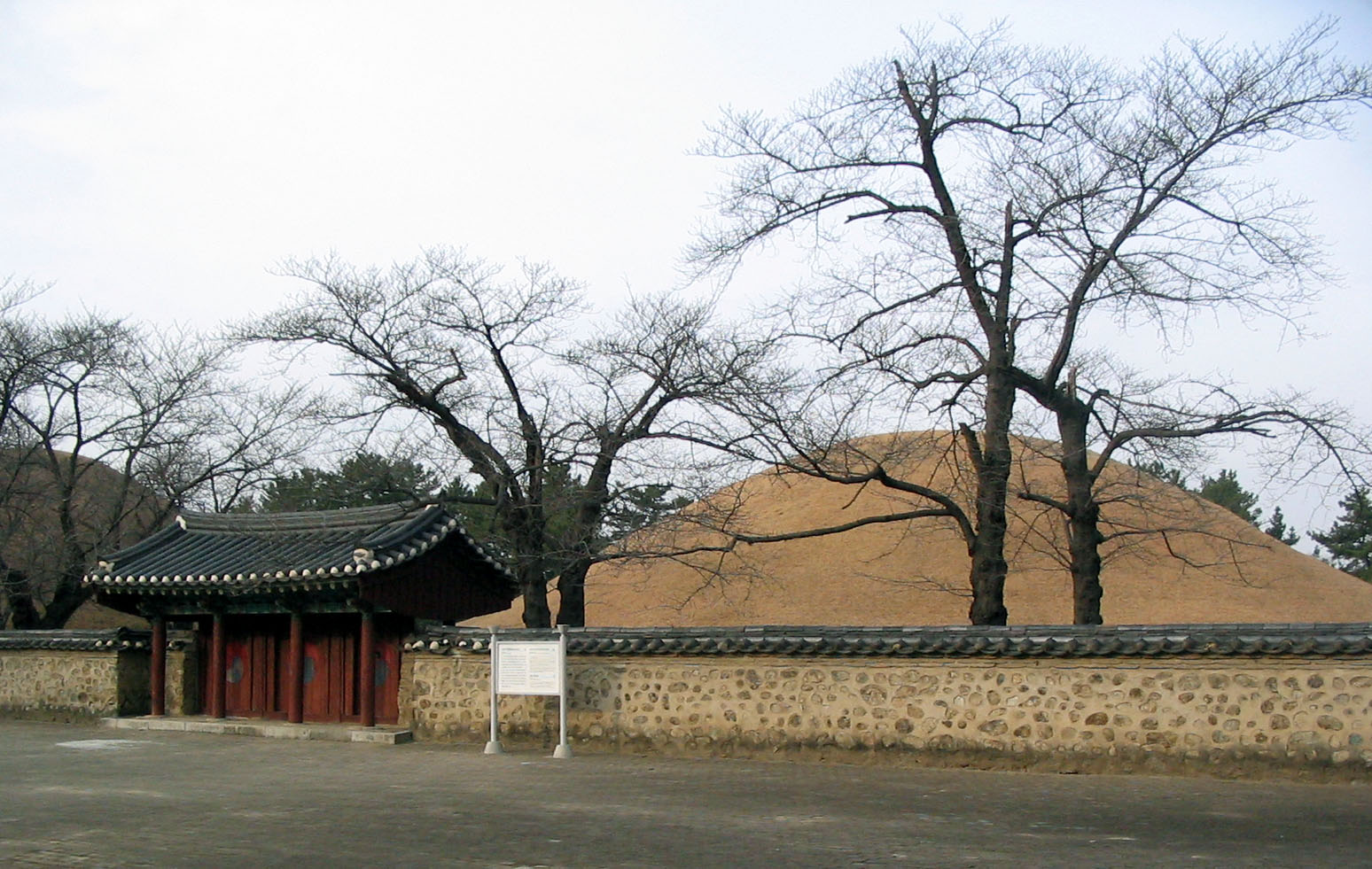

Ruler of Silla
- Reign: 262-284
- Coronation: 262
- Predecessor: Cheomhae of Silla
- Successor: Yurye of Silla
- Died: 284; Silla
- Father: Gudo Galmunwang
- Mother: Lady Sullye

Korean name
- Hangul: 미추 이사금
- Hanja: 味鄒尼師今
- RR: Michu isageum
- MR: Mich'u isagŭm

Michu was the thirteenth ruler of the Korean state of Silla (r. 262–284). He was the first king of the Kim clan to sit on the Silla throne; this clan would hold the throne for most of Silla's later history. He was the son of Gudo, a leading Silla general, and the sixth-generation descendant of the clan founder Kim Alji.

== Reign ==
As King Cheomhae died without an heir, the throne went to the son-in-law of Jobun. This shows that the Kim clan became strong enough in this period to seize power from the Seok clan. It is also possible that the Silla inheritance custom of sons and son-in-laws being of equal standing played a role in his ascension. Upon ascending to the throne, Michu posthumously named his father galmunwang.

During Michu's reign, the Samguk sagi reports numerous attacks from Baekje.

Although records of his era are not abundant, he seemed to have large interests on agriculture. In 264, he visited the peasant people to encourage them during a severe famine. In 268, subjects were dispatched by Michu to hear concerns of people.

Additionally, he was quite compassionate in that he turned down the requirement of rebuilding palaces for the reason that the people shouldn't labor too much.

After his death, power was again seized by the Seok clan and Yurye, the son of Michu's nephew (and at the same time father in law) Jobun.

Michu's tomb is preserved in central Gyeongju today. Various legends pertain to this burial mound, which is known as the Jukjangneung, or "Bamboo chief tomb."

== Family ==
- Father: Gudo Galmunwang (구도 갈문왕)
- Mother: Lady Sullye (술례부인 박씨), of the Park clan, daughter of Ichil Galmunwang (이칠 갈문왕)
- Wife: Lady Gwangmyeong (광명부인 석씨), of the Seok Clan, daughter of Jobun of Silla
  - Daughter: Lady Boban (보반부인), wife of King Naemul of Silla
  - Daughter: Lady Aryu, of the Kim clan (아류부인 김씨), wife of King Silseong of Silla

== Legend ==
It is a legend that the spirit of King Michu helped Silla and protected the country by appeasing the spirit of Kim Yu-sin, who unified the Three Kingdoms. During the reign of King Yurye of Silla, people from Iseoguk(伊西國)(present-day Cheongdo County) attacked Gyeongju, and Silla was powerless. Then, soldiers with bamboo leaves in their ears appeared and turned the state of war around. After the enemy's retreat, a pile of bamboo leaves piled up in front of the tombs of the King Michu. So, the tomb of Michu was called Jukhyeongneung or Jukjangneung, meaning "the tomb of bamboo generals".

== See also ==
- Three Kingdoms of Korea
- Rulers of Korea
- History of Korea

Michu of Silla House of Kim Died: 284
Regnal titles
Preceded by Cheomhae	Ruler of Silla; 262–284	Succeeded by Yurye
