= Jijeung of Silla =

22nd monarch of Silla (r. 500–514)

Jijeung
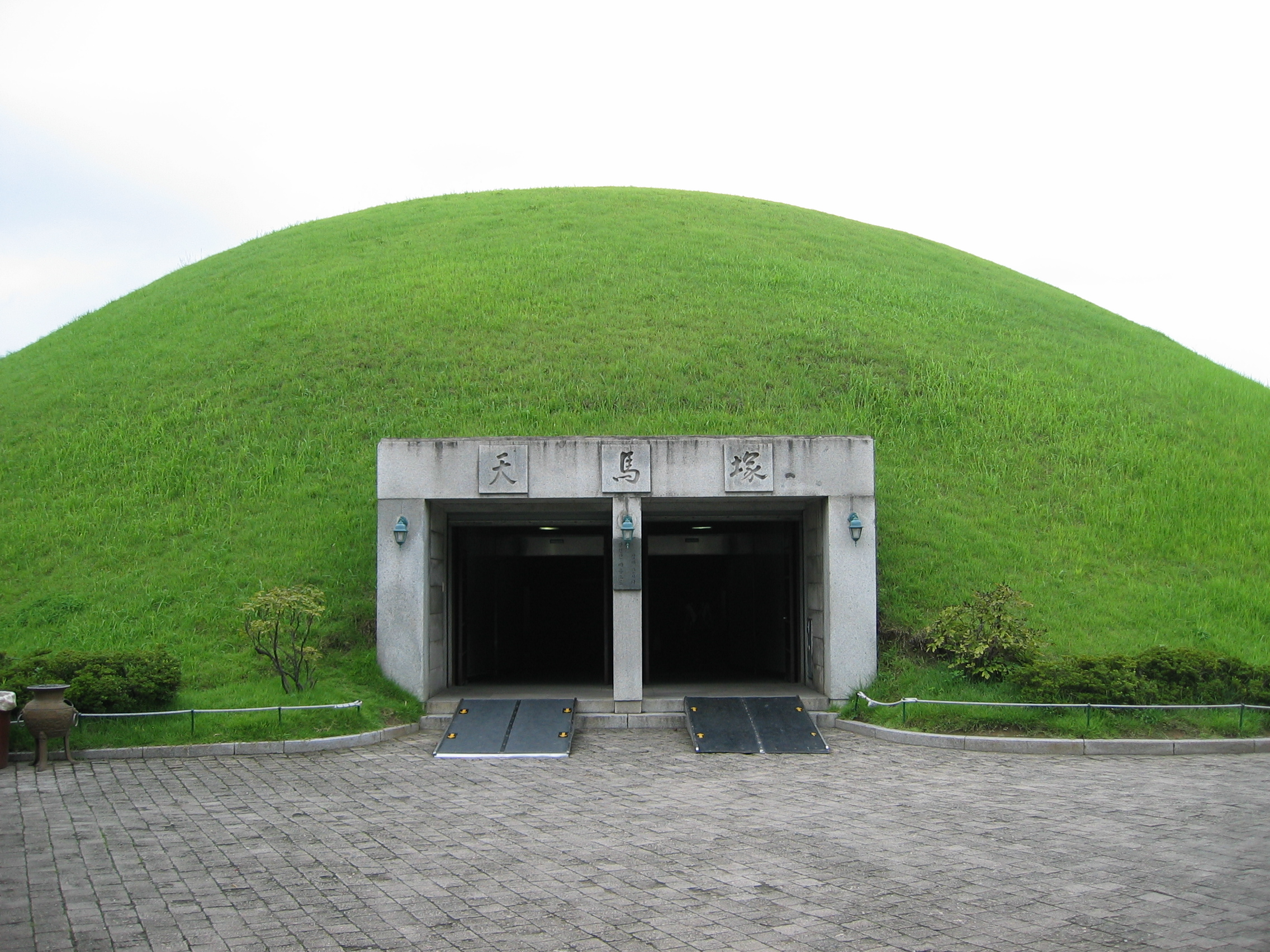
- King Jijeung's tomb

King of Silla
- Reign: 500–514
- Coronation: 500
- Predecessor: Soji of Silla
- Successor: Beopheung of Silla
- Born: 437
- Died: 514; Silla
- Burial: Cheonmachong
- Spouse: Lady Yeonje of the Park clan (연제부인박씨)
- Issue: Beopheung of Silla; Ipjong Galmunwang
Names
- Kim Jidero or Jicheollo or Jidoro
Posthumous name
- Jijeung wang
- Father: Seupbo Galmunwang
- Mother: Lady Josaeng (조생부인)

Korean name
- Hangul: 김지대로
- Hanja: 金智大路, 金智度路
- RR: Gim Jidaero
- MR: Kim Chidaero

Monarch name
- Hangul: 지증왕
- Hanja: 智證王
- RR: Jijeungwang
- MR: Chijŭngwang

Jijeung (437–514) (r. 500–514) was the 22nd ruler and 1st king of the Koreanic kingdom Silla. He is remembered for strengthening royal authority and building Silla into a centralized kingdom. On the contemporary Naengsuri Silla monument, his name was inscribed as Jidoro (Hanja: 至都盧).

== Reign ==
Like many Silla kings, Jijeung was of royal blood on both sides. His father was Kim Seup-bo Galmunwang, who was a grandson of Naemul Isageum. His mother was Lady Josaeng, the daughter of Nulji Isageum.

He was 64 years old when he ascended the throne. Jijeung began his program of legal reform in 502, when he outlawed the custom of burying servants with their masters. In 503, he formally established the country's name as "Silla," it having previously been represented by a variety of Chinese characters. At the same time, he took the title of wang, meaning "king"; he had previously borne the native Silla title of maripgan. This shows that Silla adopted the system of Chinese dyansties.

Jijeung continued this program in the following years, with a reform of ceremonial dress in 504 and of local administration in 505. In that reform, he incorporated the old territory of Siljik-guk into the Silla administrative system. He established a market in eastern Gyeongju in 509. In 512, he sent Kim Isabu to conquer the island nation of Usan-guk.

During his reign there is no record of attackes from the Wa or Goguryeo, which allowed him to concentrate on strenthening the domestic politics. However, there is a record from 501, that Baekje was preparing for a possible invasion by Silla, which shows that the alliance fostered by previous kings had weakened by the time Jijeung ascended the throne.

After his death, Jijeung received a temple name, the name by which he is now known. He was the first Silla king to receive a temple name.

King Jijeung's tomb is believed to be Cheonmachong. The height of the deceased at Cheonmachong is estimated to be around 5 feet 3 inches (160 cm).

His life is surrounded by a legend that appears in Samguk yusa, that tells the story of the king having a very large penis of "1 cha 5 chi" (approx. 45 centimetres), which made it difficult for him to find a wife. Thus he dispatched an envoy to roam the country looking for a suitable candidate. In one village, the candidate noticed two dogs fighting over a large pile of human feces. He found out that the "owner" of the pile was the daughter of the local official, who was 225 cms in height. When the king learnt of this, he sent a carriage for the lady, brought her to the palace and married her.

== Family ==
- Father: Seupbo Galmunwang
- Mother: Lady Josaeng (조생부인)
- Wife: Lady Yeonje of the Park Clan (연제부인박씨)
  - Son: Beopheung of Silla (r. 514–540 AD) - the 23rd monarch of Silla
  - Son: Ipjong Galmunwang
    - Grandson: Jinheung of Silla - the 24th monarch of Silla
  - Son: Kim Ajin (김아진종)

== See also ==
- Unified Silla
- List of Korean monarchs
- List of Silla people

Jijeung of Silla House of Kim Born: 437 Died: 514
Regnal titles
Preceded by Soji	King of Silla; 500–514	Succeeded by Beopheung
