= Kim (Korean surname) =

Korean surname

- Hanja for Kim
- Pronunciation: [kim]
- Language: Korean

Origin
- Meaning: Gold, iron, metal
- Region of origin: Korea

Korean name
- Hangul: 김
- Hanja: 金
- RR: Gim
- MR: Kim

Kim (Korean: 김; Hanja: 金) is the most common surname in Korea. As of the 2015 South Korean census, there were 10,689,959 people by this name in South Korea or 21.5% of the population. Although the surname is always pronounced the same, dozens of different family clans (bon-gwan) use it. The clan system in Korea is unique from the surname systems of other countries. Kim is written as 김 (gim) in both North and South Korea. The hanja for Kim, 金, can also be transliterated as 금 (geum) which means 'gold, metal, iron'. While romanized as Kim by 99.3% of the population, other rare variant romanizations such as Gim, Ghim, and Kin make up the remaining 0.7%.

== Origin ==
The first historical document that records the surname dates to 636 and references it as the surname of Korean King Jinheung of Silla (526–576). In the Silla kingdom (57 BCE – 935 CE)—which variously battled and allied with other states on the Korean peninsula and ultimately unified most of the country in 668—Kim was the name of a family that rose to prominence and became the rulers of Silla for 586 years. Silla and Gaya clans Kim came from the Huns (Xiongnu). Many scholars have suggested that Kim Al-chi (Alti) may have been the chief of a "gold" (altin) clan of Korea and Manchuria, whose story is similar to the legend of Alji Geo-seo-khan.

== Clans ==
Percentage of family names in South Korea. Kim, Gim, Ghim Lee, Yi, Rhee, Yie Park, Bark, Pak, Bhak Choi, Choe Jung, Jeong, Chung, Cheong

As with other Korean surnames, different clans, known as bon-gwan, are inherited from a father to his children. These designate the region of Korea or paternal ancestor from which they claim to originate.

The 2000 South Korean census listed 348 extant Kim lineages.

=== Major clans ===
==== Uiseong ====
The Uiseong Kim (의성김씨; 義城金氏) clan traces its lineage back to Kim Seok, also known as Kim Jung-seok, the son of Gyeongsun of Silla.

==== Andong ====
The Andong Kim clan (안동김씨; 安東金氏) consists of two separate clans, distinguished as Gu (구; 舊) and Shin (신; 新), that have two separate progenitors.

Some notable Gu Andong Kim clan members were General Kim Si-min and Prime Minister Kim Sa-hyeong, who was involved with the Gangnido map, as well as Royal Noble Consort Hwi who was banished for witchcraft.

The Shin Andong Kim clan was one of the powerful clans that dominated the later part of Joseon. One of the most powerful members from the clan was Kim Jo-sun, who was the father-in-law to Sunjo of Joseon. Kim Josun's daughter was Queen Sunwon.

==== Gimhae (Kimhae) ====
The origin of the clan traces back to Suro of Geumgwan Gaya and his ten children, who started the Kim dynasty of Geumgwan Gaya, the capital of which was in present-day Gimhae. Famous ancient members of this clan, aside from the kings of Geumgwan Gaya, include the Silla general Kim Yu-sin. In Later Silla, members of the Gimhae Kim family were admitted to all but the highest level of the Silla bone rank system.

This clan is by far the most populous of all Korean clans. According to the 2015 South Korean census, there were 4,456,700 Gimhae Kim clan members in South Korea.

Distribution of ancestral lines of the Kim surname (1988)

==== Gyeongju ====
The Gyeongju Kims (경주김씨; 慶州金氏) trace their descent from the ruling family of Silla. The founder of this clan is said to have been Kim Al-chi, an orphan adopted by King Talhae of Silla in the 1st century CE. Alji's seventh-generation descendant was the first member of the clan to take the throne, as King Michu of Silla in the year 262. According to the South Korean census of 2015, there were 1,800,853 Gyeongju Kims in South Korea.

==== Nagan ====
The Nagan Kim clan (낙안김씨; 樂安金氏) is small. Its progenitor, Kim Sujing (김수징; 金粹澄), was a descendant of the last king of Silla and established their ancestral home in Suncheon. In the South Korean census of 2000, less than 10,000 citizens claimed to be Nagan Kims.

==== Hamchang ====
The Hamchang Kim clan (함창김씨; 咸昌金氏) trace their origin to the founder of the little-known Gaya confederacy state of Goryeong Gaya, King Taejo. His alleged tomb, rediscovered in the sixteenth century, is still preserved by the modern-day members of the clan. This clan numbered only 26,300 members in the 2000 South Korean census.

==== Gwangsan ====
The Gwangsan Kim clan (광산김씨; 光山金氏) was one of the most prominent clans during Joseon. The Gwangsan Kims are the descendants of Kim Heung-gwang (김흥광, 金興光), who was the third prince of Sinmu of Silla, its 45th monarch.

==== Yaseong ====
The Yaseong Kim clan (야성김씨; 野城金氏) is from Yeongdeok County. The name Yeongdeok replaced an earlier name, Yaseong, which means 'city in the wilderness', and dates its origins back to Silla.

==== Cheongpung ====
The Cheongpung Kim clan (청풍김씨; 淸風金氏) was one of the aristocratic families during the Joseon. Two queens were from this clan during that period. Several members of the clan also became prime ministers.

==== Yonan (Yeonan) ====
The Yonan Kim clan was an aristocratic clan that had members in high government positions and included members of the royal family through marriage during the Joseon era. Six members of the clan were prime ministers throughout the dynasty, and three women of the clan became royal princess consorts, including one Grand Princess consort and two Princess consorts. The clan also produced Queen Inmok, (1584 – 1632), who was 14th-generation member of the clan, and Queen Consort of King Seonjo of Joseon. Additionally, Kim Hŭi (김희; 金禧, ? - 1531), a 12th-generation member of the clan, married Princess Hyohye, and became son-in-law of King Jungjong of Joseon, receiving the title Consort Prince Yeonseong (연성위; 延城尉 Yŏnsŏng-wi). The founder of the Yonan Kim clan was Kim Sŏm-han (김섬한; 金暹漢), who is believed to be a descendant of Kim Al-chi.

==== Gangneung ====
The Gangneung Kim clan (강릉김씨; 江陵金氏) originated from Gangneung in Gangwon Province. The progenitor was Kim Chu-wŏn, who was a descendant of Muyeol of Silla.

==== Sangsan ====
The Sangsan Kim clan (상산김씨; 商山金氏) originated from Sangju in North Gyeongsang Province. The progenitor was Kim Su (김수; 金需) and the clan had members that participated in the Joseon government.

==== Ulsan ====
The Ulsan Kim clan (울산김씨; 蔚山金氏) originated from Ulsan in Yeongnam. One of the members of this clan, Kim Inhu, was one of the 18 Sages of Korea and honored as a Munmyo Bae-hyang (문묘배향; 文廟配享).

==== Seoheung ====
The Seoheung Kim clan (서흥김씨; 瑞興金氏) was one of the smaller Kim clans during the Joseon. The progenitor was Kim Bo (김보; 金寶) and one of the members was Kim Gwoeng-pil (김굉필; 金宏弼), who was one of the 18 Sages of Korea and honored as Munmyo Bae-hyang (문묘배향; 文廟配享).

==== Wonju ====
The Wonju Kim clan (원주김씨; 原州金氏) might be one of the smallest Kim clans during the Joseon. They had two members that became prime ministers during that period.

==== Jeonju ====
According to the South Korean census of 2015, there were 56,989 members of the Jeonju Kim clan in South Korea. Its progenitor, Kim T'ae-sŏ, was descended from the last king of Silla, Gyeongsun of Silla. South Korean artist Kim Hee-chul is from the Jeonju clan, as are the North Korean leaders Kim Il Sung, Kim Jong Il, and Kim Jong Un.

=== Other clans ===
- Ansan Kim, 안산김씨
- Bu-an Kim, 부안김씨
- Cheongdo Kim, 청도김씨
- Cheongju Kim, 청주김씨
- Daegu Kim, 대구김씨
- Dogang Kim, 도강김씨 (Gangjin Kim, 강진김씨)
- Eon-yang Kim, 언양김씨
- Gaeseong Kim, 개성김씨
- Geumsan Kim, 금산김씨
- Gimnyeong Kim, 김녕김씨
- Gongju Kim, 공주김씨
- Go-ryeong Kim, 고령김씨
- Go-seong Kim, 고성김씨
- Gwangju Kim, 광주김씨
- Gyeongseong Kim, 경성김씨
- Hanyang Kim, 한양김씨 (Korean adoptees)
- Jinju Kim, 진주김씨
- Joong-hwa Kim, 중화씨
- Naju Kim, 나주김씨
- Pungcheon Kim, 풍천김씨
- Pungsan Kim, 풍산김씨
- Samcheok Kim, 삼척김씨
- Seoha Kim, 서하김씨
- Seonsan Kim, 선산김씨
- Suncheon Kim, 순천김씨
- Suwon Kim, 수원김씨
- Ye-an Kim, 예안김씨
- Yeongdong Kim, 영동김씨 (Yeongsan Kim, 영산김씨)
- Yeong-gwang Kim, 영광김씨

== See also ==
- Culture of Korea
- Korean name
- List of Korean family names
- Smith (surname)
