= Seok (Korean name) =

Seok (Korean: 석), also spelled Suk, is a rare Korean family name held by about 56,500 South Koreans, as well as a Korean given name.

== As a family name ==
The family name Seok can be written with either of two hanja, one meaning "stone" (石), and the other meaning "ancient" (昔). The former is the more widespread of the two. The 2000 South Korean census found 46,066 people by this name, while the 2015 census listed 49,203. Of these, the great majority are members of the Gyeongju Seok clan and the Chungju (also called Hongju) Seok clan. The latter had a 2000 South Korean population of 9,544. The Gyeongju Seok clan claims descent from certain of the early rulers of Silla; the first Gyeongju Seok to sit on the throne was the fourth Silla king, Talhae.

In a study by the National Institute of the Korean Language based on 2007 application data for South Korean passports, it was found that 61.3% of people with that surname spelled it in Latin letters as Seok in their passports, vs. 30.6% as Suk. Rarer alternative spellings (the remaining 8.1%) included Seog, Sok, Souk, and Sock.

People with this family name include:

- Seok Joo-myung (1908–1950), Korean lepidopterist of the Japanese colonial period
- Seok Ju-seon (1911–1996), Korean scholar of traditional Korean clothing and folklorist
- Seok Rae-myeong (1936–2003), South Korean film director
- Seok Jong-gu (born 1944), South Korean boxer
- Seok Cheoljoo (born 1950), South Korean painter and professor
- Suk Min-hee (born 1968), South Korean team handball player, Olympic gold medalist
- Suk Jong-yul (born 1969), South Korean professional golfer
- Seok Jung-ah (born 1971), South Korean retired volleyball player
- Jeannie Suk (born 1973), Korean American law professor
- Suk Jin-wook (born 1976), South Korean retired volleyball player
- Seok Eun-mi (born 1976), South Korean table tennis player, Olympic silver medalist
- Seok Ha-jung (born 1985), Chinese-born South Korean table tennis player
- Suk Hyun-joon (born 1985), South Korean former professional tennis player
- Suk Young-jin (born 1990), South Korean bobsledder
- Seok Dong-woo (born 1990), South Korean footballer
- Suk Hyun-jun (born 1991), South Korean footballer
- Seok Matthew (born 2002), Canadian singer, member of boy band Zerobaseone
- Bailey Sok (born 2004), American professional dancer and choreographer

== Given name ==
People with the given name Seok include:

- Baek Seok (1912–1995), North Korean poet
- Yi Seok (born 1941), descendant of the Joseon Dynasty royal family
- Jo Seok (born 1983), South Korean webcomic artist
- Kim Seok (born 1991), South Korean football player
- Kim Seok (equestrian) (born 1992), South Korean equestrian

== See also ==
- List of Korean family names
- List of Korean given names
