= Galmunwang =

Silla noble title

Galmunwang (Korean: 갈문왕; Hanja: 葛文王) was a title used in the early period of the Korean kingdom of Silla. Its precise meaning and function are not known. From Korean sources, namely the Samguk sagi, it would appear that the title of Galmunwang was granted to very high-ranking personages in early Silla and was equivalent to the king but without right of succession. It seems to have been granted to the chiefs of lineages of the clans of the reigning king, queen, and royal mother. As Lee Kibaik pointed out, the granting of the title of Galmunwang reflected the close relationship between the monarch and the other high noble families in early Silla. It could also be posthumously granted to biological fathers of monarchs, and the kings' fathers-in-law.

The granting of the title Galmunwang was discontinued during the middle period of Silla following the accession of King Muyeol, reflecting the augmentation of royal authority at the expense of that of the nobility following Silla unification of the peninsula. During the late period of Silla, however, the title of daewang (대왕), akin to the Galmunwang was reinstituted for fathers of kings who were not kings themselves.

The royal family members who could become Galmunwang were the queen's father or the king's maternal grandfather, the second was the king's father who was not the king himself, and the king's younger brother. The consort of Queen Seondeok also held this title.
