= Seongmo =

Seong-mo (Korean: 성모; Hanja: 聖母; lit. 'the holy mother') are female mountain deities worshipped in Korean folklore. They are also known as Sin-mo (Korean: 신모; Hanja: 神母; lit. 'the divine mother'), Mo-ju (Korean: 모주; Hanja: 母主; lit. 'the matriarch'), Hal-mi (Korean: 할미), Hal-mang (Korean: 할망), or No-go (Korean: 노고; Hanja: 老姑; all three mean lit. 'the old woman, granny, or crone').

Korean mountain deities were originally female. Only in later periods the concept of a white-bearded male mountain spirit (Sansillyeong) emerge, shifting their gender to male. The surviving legends of Seongmo can be regarded as having preserved the forms of ancient goddesses.

Japan's Yama-uba is a figure derived from an ancient female mountain deities that declined and degenerated into hags, suggesting a parallel between Korean mythology.

== List of Seongmo by mountains ==
- Jeonggyeon Moju of Gaya Mountain, the mother of King Suro of Gaya
- Lady Jeongnyeo of Bugak Mountain
- Lady Saso of Seondo Mountain, the mother of King Hyeokgeose of Silla
- Yeongchuksan Seongmo of Yeongchuk Mountain, who is identified with the Buddhist deity Saraswati in the Samguk yusa
- Lady Unje of Unje Mountain, the wife of King Namhae of Silla
- Lady Hwang of Ilwol Mountain
- Crone Dajagu of Jungnyeong Pass
- Crone Mago or Mayago of Jiri Mountain
- Chisul Sinmo of Chisullyeong, the wife of Bak Jesang
- Pyeongnasanju of Pyeongna Mountain, the wife of Kang Hogyŏng, the sixth-generation maternal ancestor of King Taejo of Goryeo
- Granny Seolmundae of Halla Mountain
- Crone Seogu of the Samcheok–Donghae area in Gangwon Province, whose legend evolved into that of a malevolent hag and demon fox
- Yeongsangaksi, a female mountain deity worshipped in the shamanistic ritual of Hamhung
