= Oreung =

Royal tombs in Gyeongju, South Korea

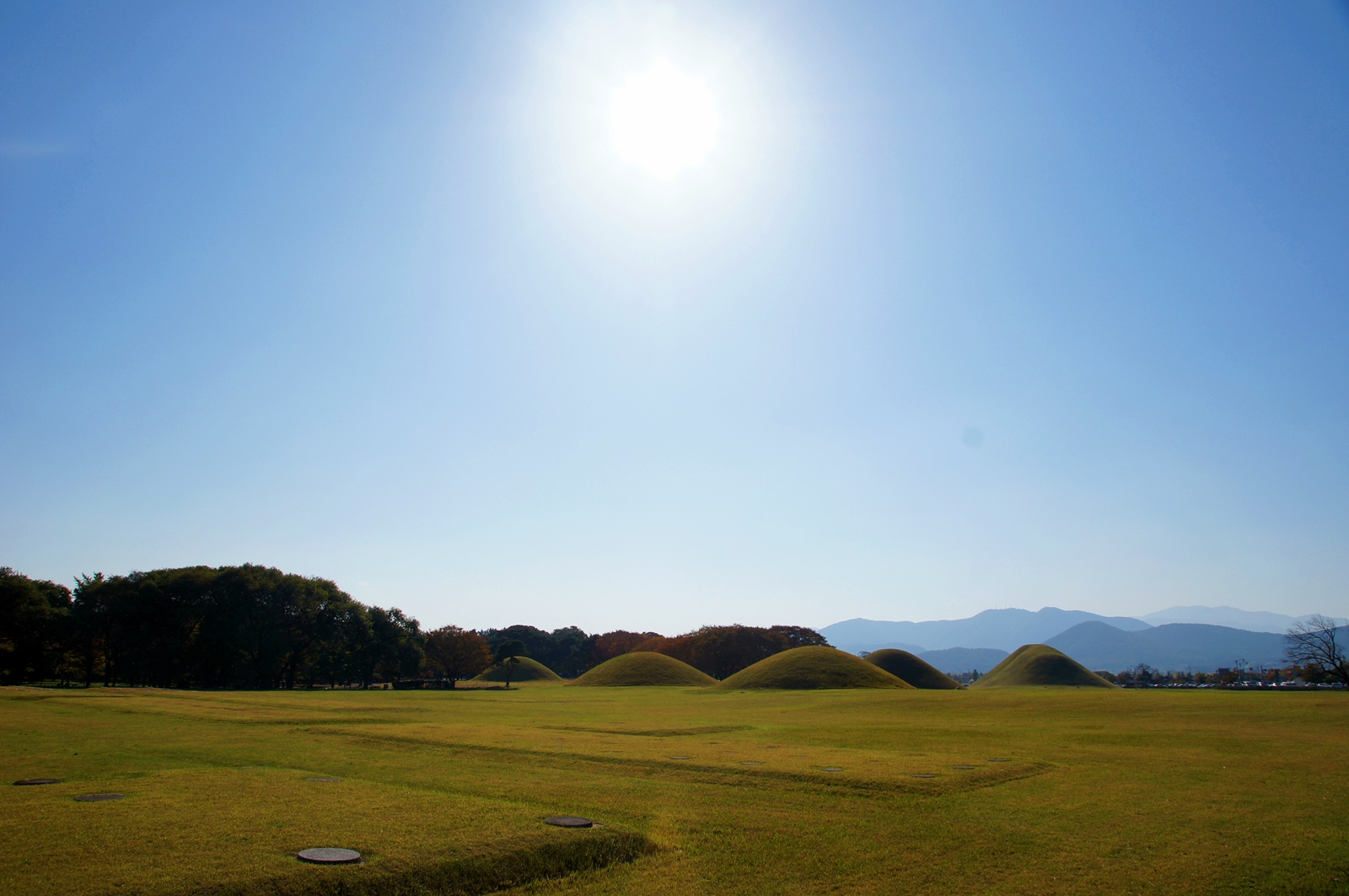
- The tombs (2014)
- Interactive map of Oreung
- Location: Gyeongju, South Korea
- Coordinates: 35.8231°N 129.2082°E

UNESCO World Heritage Site
- Criteria: Cultural: (ii), (iii)
- Designated: 2000
- Part of: Gyeongju Historic Areas
- Reference no.: 976

Historic Sites of South Korea
- Official name: Five Royal Tombs, Gyeongju
- Designated: 1969-08-27
- Reference no.: 172

Oreung (Korean: 오릉; Hanja: 五陵; lit. 'five tombs') is a complex of five Silla-era royal tombs in Gyeongju, South Korea. They are now a tourist attraction. They are part of the Gyeongju Historic Areas UNESCO World Heritage Site. On August 27, 1969, it was made Historic Site of South Korea No. 172.

The tombs are attested to in the historical text Samguk sagi as Sareung (사릉; 蛇陵; Sarŭng). It is not known with certainty who the tombs belong to, but they are believed to belong to the Silla founding monarch Hyeokgeose, his wife Lady Aryeong, Silla's second king Namhae, the third king Yuri, and the fifth king Pasa. The tombs are tumuli and vary in height. The tallest is 10 m (33 ft) tall, and the shortest is 1.8 m (5.9 ft). According to the Encyclopedia of Korean Culture, the tombs have yet to be excavated, so their internal structure is unknown.
