= Lady Aryeong =

1st century BCE Korean kingdom of Silla founder's wife

- Hangul: 알영부인
- Hanja: 閼英夫人
- RR: Aryeong buin
- MR: Aryŏng puin

Lady Aryeong (Korean: 알영부인; Hanja: 閼英夫人; 53 BC – 4 BC) was married to Hyeokgeose of Silla who was the founder of Silla. According to Samguk Yusa (Memorabilia of the Three Kingdoms), Aryeong was born from the left side of the dragon which appeared near the well. However, the Samguk Sagi (History of the Three Kingdoms), says it was the right side.

== History ==
According to the Samguk sagi, In the spring of the 5th year (B.C. 53) a dragon appeared in the Alyeongjeong (알영정; 閼英井), Gyeongju. A girl was born on the right side. But Samguk Yusa portrays the episode of birth of Aryeong from the left side of the hen-dragon (gyeryong; 계룡; 鷄龍).

Either way, an old age woman found it bizarre and raised the girl. As she grew up, her virtue and appearance were outstanding, and King greeted her when he heard the news and made her his queen. At this time, people called them two saints.

== Historical context ==
According to the Samguk Yusa, A ship carrying Talhae reached Azin Port (阿珍浦口). That was 39th year (B.C.19). At that time, an old mother (老母) on the beach collected and raised him. The old mother's name is Ahjinuisun (阿珍義先). The Hyukgeose's fishing grandmother (海尺之母) is Ahjinuisun (阿珍義先) too. In record "she didn't know if it was good or bad, so she went to the sky". Based on this record, Old mother(老母) is Jinhan's shaman and Aryeong's old age woman (老嫗) may also symbolize the same shaman group. addition, it can be inferred that Aryeong is highly related to shaman based on the record of Namhae Chachaung(南解 次次雄) who is Aryeong's son, a Silla dialect, "Chachaung"(次次雄) calling a shaman.

It can also be interpreted that Alyeong has the character of representing the natives in the early days of the foundation of Saro, from being described as another saint(聖人).

== Outline ==
Lady Aryeong was a daughter of Lady Saso who was said to come from the Chinese royal family and moved to the Jinhan confederacy according to legends. However, whether Lady Saso was of Chinese origin is attested and is highly unlikely, considering the fact that deitifications were common back in the days when the 'Middle Kingdoms (中原)' was considered the center of civilization. The sources of these claims also comes from China during the Song Dynasty, roughly a thousand years later; something highly respected scholars and bureaucrats such as Kim Bu-sik (who is of royal Silla descent) has never heard of.

She was married to Hyeokgeose of Silla who was the founder of Silla and he was also a son of Lady Saso. According to Samguk Yusa (Memorabilia of the Three Kingdoms), Aryeong was born from the left side of the dragon which appeared near the well. However, the Samguk Sagi (History of the Three Kingdoms), says it was the right side. According to the Buddhist monk Il-yeon, the "dragon" in these histories refers to Lady Saso.

The following description is from the Samguk Yusa (Memorabilia of the three Kingdoms), volume 5, clause 7.

其始到辰韓也。生聖子為東國始君。蓋赫居閼英二聖之所自也。故稱雞龍雞林白馬等。雞屬西故也。嘗使諸天仙織羅。緋染作朝衣。贈其夫。國人因此始知神驗。

She came to the Jinhan confederacy in the beginning, gave birth to sacred children and became the first king of the eastern country. One day, Saso made a fairy of the heavens weave silk cloth, dye it in scarlet and make a Korean garment. She sent this garment to her husband. This was the first time people in the country knew of her miracles. Probably those children were Aryeong and Hyeokgeose of Silla. That's why they are called Gye-Nong (계농), Gye-Rim (계림), Baek-Ma (백마) and so on: because Gye (계) belongs to the west side.

However, the first mention of "Gye-Rim (계림), Gye (계)" is mentioned for the first time in the Kim Al-ji legend.

== Worship ==
She was worshipped as a goddess after death. She was worshipped during droughts, as it was believed she could pour water to stimulate rain. Her holy well was a place of pilgrimage for women who wished to become pregnant.

== Family ==
N/A | 사소부인; Saso
혁거세 거서간; Hyeokgeose | 알영부인; Aryeong
남해 차차웅; Namhae

- Husband - Park Hyeokgeose, King of Silla (혁거세 거서간; 69 BC – 4 BC)
- Issue
  - Son - Park Teuk (박특)
  - Son - Park Namhae, King of Silla (남해 차차웅; 50 BC – 24 BC)
    - Daughter-in-law - Lady Woonje (운제부인) or Lady Ahru (아루부인)
      - Grandson - Park Yuri, King of Silla (유리 이사금; ? – 57 BC)
      - Granddaughter - Lady Ahyo of the Miryang Park clan (아효부인 박씨)
        - Grandson-in-law - Seok Talhae, King of Silla (탈해 이사금; 19 BC/5 BC – 80 BC August)
  - Daughter - Princess Ahro (아로공주)
  - Son - Il-ji King Galmun (일지 갈문왕)
    - Granddaughter - Lady Yiri of the Miryang Park clan (이리생부인 박씨)
      - Grandson-in-law - Park Yuri, King Silla (유리 이사금; ? – 57 BC)
        - Great-Grandson - Park Pasa, King of Silla (파사이사금; ? – October 112)
        - Great-Grandson - Park Ilseong, King of Silla (일성이사금; 44 BC – 154 BC)
          - Great-Great-Grandson - Park Adalla, King of Silla (아달라이사금; ? – 184 BC)
  - Son - Park Heo-ru, King Galmun (허루 갈문왕)
