= Yuri of Silla =

King of Silla from 24 to 57

King Yuri 유리 이사금 儒理尼師今
- Isageum
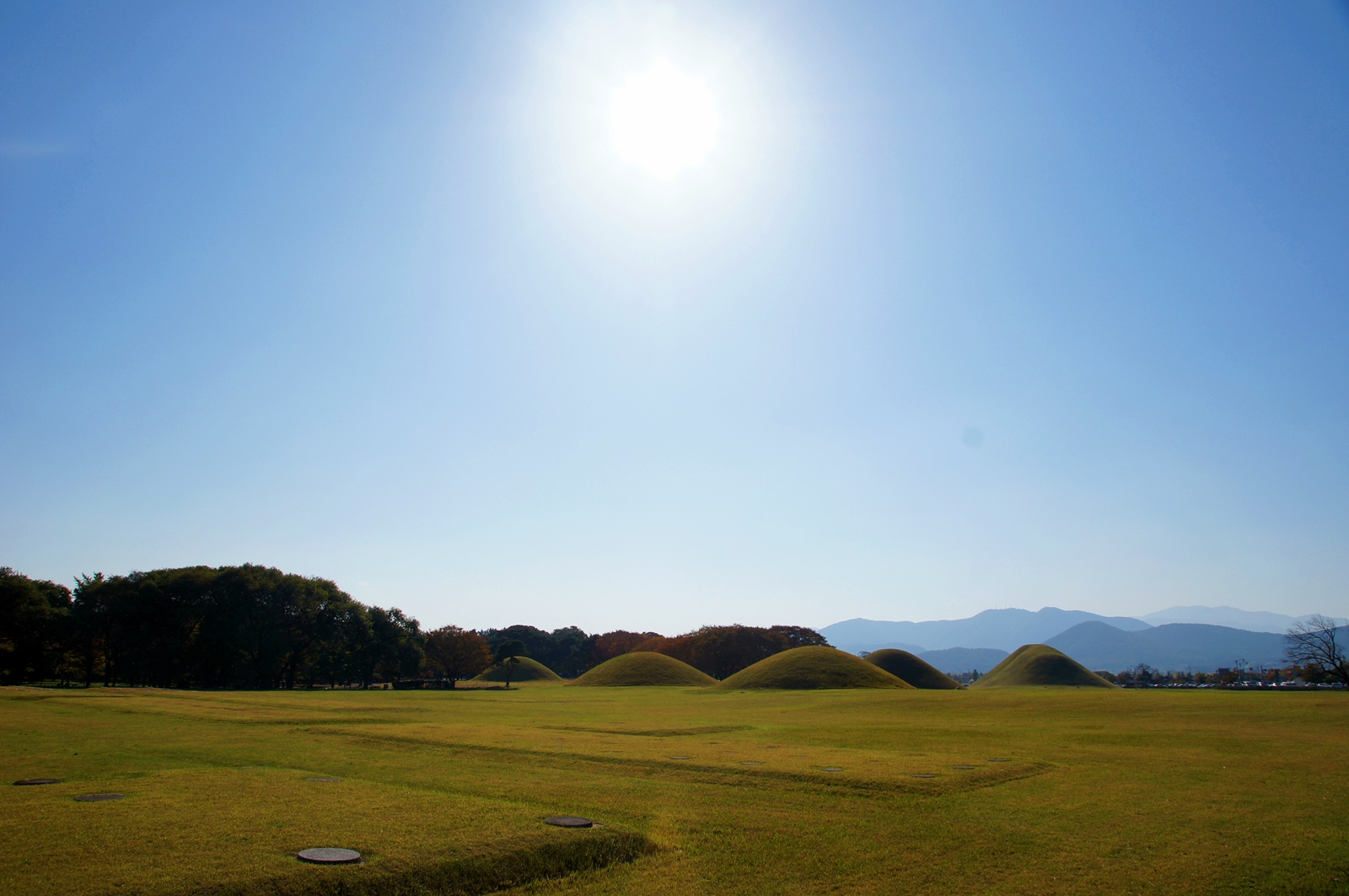
- Tomb of King Yuri

Ruler of Silla
- Reign: 24-57
- Coronation: 24
- Predecessor: Namhae of Silla
- Successor: Talhae of Silla
- Born: Unknown
- Died: 57; Silla
Posthumous name
- King Yuri (유리 이사금; 儒理尼師今)
- Father: King Namhae
- Mother: Lady Unje

- Yuri of Silla
- Hangul: 유리 이사금; 노례 이사금
- Hanja: 儒理尼師今; 弩禮尼師今
- RR: Yuri isageum; Norye isageum
- MR: Yuri isagŭm; Norye isagŭm

Yuri (?–57, r. 24–57) was the third king of Silla, one of the Three Kingdoms of Korea. He is commonly called Yuri Isageum.

== Family ==
Parents

- Father: King Namhae of Silla
  - Grandfather: King Hyeokgeose of Silla
  - Grandmother: Lady Aryeong
    - Great-Grandmother: Lady Saso
- Mother: Lady Unje (알영부인)

Consorts and their respective issue:

- unnamed daughter of Ilji Galmunwang (일지갈문왕) from the Park clan; or daughter of Heoru Galmunwang (허루갈문왕); or daughter of Prince Sayo (사요왕). There is no mention of secondary queens in historical records.
  - King Ilseong of Silla (d.154), 1st son according to Samguk sagi, although the same record also mentions the possibility of Ilseong being the son of Ilji Galmunwang.
  - King Pasa of Silla (d. 112), 2nd son, or the son of Yuri's brother Naro.
  - Prince Ado, whom modern scholars consider the actual father of Ilseong.
  - Two unnamed daughters

== Name ==
As a descendant of Silla's founder Hyeokgeose, his surname was Park.

His title was Isageum, also recorded as Ijilgeum or Chijilgeum. This title is a change from Geoseogan (the first king Hyeokgeose) and Chachaung (second king Namhae). The actual Silla word is thought to be Itgeum . Imgeum is the modern Korean word for "King".

== Background ==
Yuri was the son of Silla's second ruler, Namhae, and his queen Lady Unje. It is unclear how many siblings Namhae had, but he did have a sister. This sister, Princess Ani, was married to a non-Sillan man named Seok Talhae, who originated from an island nation called Tapana. Talhae became a very highly ranked official and Namhae seemed to prefer him as successor instead of his son. This is revealed on Namhae's deathbed, but Talhae insisted that the prince's rise to the throne would be righteous and allowed Yuri to become the next ruler of Silla.

== Reign ==
According to the Samguk sagi, the principal source for events of this period, Yuri centralized rule over the aristocracy by turning the six tribes into six official administrative divisions of Silla in 32. He is said to have granted surnames to each of the clans: Yi, Choe, Son, Jeong, Bae, and Seol. He is also said to have created 17 bureaucratic rank levels. However, modern scholars doubt that these occurred so early in Silla's development.

In 37, When Muhyul (無恤) attacked Nakrang Kingdom and destroyed it, 5000 people of the Nakrang country surrendered. They were divided into Silla's six divisions. This is when the legend of Princess Nakrang occurred.

Silla was attacked by Lelang commandery and other tribes, but made peace with Maekguk(貊國). The Samguk sagi records that Silla conquered Iseoguk (present-day Cheongdo) in Yuri Isageum era.

During Yuri's reign, the Silla people celebrated a holiday during the 15th day of the 8th month, where two teams of women would compete in a contest. The losers of the contest would have to prepare songpyeon, rice cakes, meats, fruits, and other food, shared by everyone in a feast. This is said to have been the origin of the modern Korean holiday Chuseok.

Also during Yuri Isageum's reign was the rise of the Gaya confederacy as a military power in the region. Silla was under constant rivalry with Baekje(or maybe Mahan) already, but Gaya in the middle was even more of a direct threat.

== Succession ==
Yuri Isageum had two sons, but his dying words were to make his brother-in-law, Seok Talhae, his successor to the throne. Yuri Isageum died in 57 AD after 34 years of reign.

== See also ==
- Three Kingdoms of Korea
- Rulers of Korea
- Proto–Three Kingdoms of Korea

Yuri of Silla House of Park Died: 57
Regnal titles
Preceded by Namhae	Ruler of Silla; 24–57	Succeeded by Talhae
