= Lady Saso =

- Hangul: 사소부인
- Hanja: 娑蘇夫人
- RR: Saso buin
- MR: Saso puin

Lady Saso (Korean: 사소부인; Hanja: 娑蘇夫人) is said to be the mother of Hyeokgeose of Silla first introduced in Samguk Yusa. Also known as the Seondosan Seongmo (선도산성모; 仙桃山聖母), legends say she was a princess from the Buyeo royal family. She gave birth to Hyeokgeose of Silla. Later, she was honored as great king (queen regnant) (Note: In Korean Language, a queen regnant is called a yeowang (여왕, "female king").) by King Gyeongmyeong.

== Outline ==
The following description is from the Samguk Yusa (Memorabilia of the three Kingdoms), volume 5, clause 7.

名娑蘇。早得神仙之術。歸止海東。久而不還。父皇寄書繫足云。隨鳶所止為家。蘇得書放鳶。飛到此山而止。遂來宅為地仙。故名西鳶山。神母久據茲山。鎮祐邦國。靈異甚多。 The Sacred Mother was called SaSo and she was born in the buyeo royal family. She got sacred power and came to Hae Dong (해동/Korea), lived there and stayed there for long time. She tied a letter to the foot of a kite saying “Let's build a house where the kite stops”. Once she wrote the letter and released the kite, it flew to Mt. Seondo (West mountain of Gyeongju/慶州) and stopped there. She decided to live there and became Xian (仙) of the land. That mountain was named as West Kite mountain and the Sacred Mother SaSo stayed there as her base for quite a long time and protected the country. There are a lot of miracles around that mountain as well.

其始到辰韓也。生聖子為東國始君。蓋赫居閼英二聖之所自也。故稱雞龍雞林白馬等。雞屬西故也。嘗使諸天仙織羅。緋染作朝衣。贈其夫。國人因此始知神驗。 She came to the Jinhan confederacy in the beginning, gave birth to sacred children and became the first king of the eastern country. Probably those children were Aryeong and Hyeokgeose of Silla. That's why they are called Gye-Nong (계농), Gye-Rim (계림), Baek-Ma (백마) and so on: because Gye (계) belongs to west side. One day, SaSo made a fairy of the heavens weave silk cloth, dye it in scarlet and make a Korean garment. She sent this garment to her husband. This was the first time people in the country knew of her miracles.

=== Criticisms surrounding her origins ===
==== Chinese accounts ====
Historians have long questioned the origins of Lady Saso noting the case of Kim Pusik, a Goryeo bureaucrat whom authored the Samguk Sagi (not to be confused with Samguk Yusa), who had been oblivious to these "tales and rumors" (as he puts it) of Lady Saso prior to his visit to Song dynasty China. During Kim's visit to the kingdom (circa 1111–1117), his Chinese guide, "Wang Fu" (Traditional Chinese: 王黼) explained to Kim Pusik who saw the statue of a woman in "Wuxingwan" (Traditional Chinese: 佑神館) as someone who was "a legendary figure (Lady Saso) of your country who was a daughter of an ancient Chinese emperor who fled east after being exiled for becoming pregnant without a husband" and that he (Wang) and his followers worshipped said individual.

Kim Pusik later remarked about the rather peculiar encounter and questioned the validity of such claim made by a foreign Chinese who was heavily invested in a legend that neither he (Kim) or his people had any knowledge of. Therefore, he did not include the myth in his history- and fact-focused Samguk Sagi.

A century later, it is said that Il-yeon took note of the experience of Kim Pusik and included it in his collection of folktales and legends, the Samguk Yusa. But much like most claims made in Samguk Yusa, historians are very skeptical as to whether or not such individuals truly existed.

Another criticism focuses on these tales as being no different from mere deifications that stems from ideas such as Sinocentrism or Buddhism, which claims unidentified individuals of foreign origins (such as Chinese or Indians) as supposed ancestors of past royals with no grounded evidence. (Note: Wang Yang(王襄), the envoy of the Song dynasty, came to Goryeo as an envoy and offered a ancestral rites to Eastern Saint Lady(東神聖母女), and there was a phrase, "pregnant with Wise Saint(賢聖) and established the country." However, Eastern Saint Lady(東神聖母女) appears in book named Goryeo Dogyeong(고려도경/ hanja:高麗圖經). According to this book, Eastern Saint Temple enshrines Lady Yuhwa as a god. There is a suspicion that Song historian who told Kim Pusik a story of Lady Saso could not distinguish Goguryeo from Silla. It's presumed error by the Chinese historian who lacked an understanding of early Korean history and Korean Historian who has been blindly following the Chinese opinion.) Such claims have also been made by Il-yeon within Samguk Yusa, in regards to the origins of Heo Hwang-ok being ancient India.

Claims made by Samguk Yusa (the source material Lady Saso is first mentioned in) is presumed to be the result of Chinese Sinocentrism, aligning with the claims that the Japanese were descended from Xu Fu (徐福), the Xiongnu were descendants of Lü-Gui (履癸王) the last king of Xia (夏) and that the case of Gojoseon (古朝鮮) and Gouwu (句吳) all revolve around China and its cultural significance.

However, despite finding multiple claims in numerous texts across East Asia (and even Southeast Asia), modern historians have a difficult time cross-referencing and deducing on concrete evidence which back the legitimacy of such assertions, later stating that the claims made in the past were mostly hearsay. As such, the story of Lady Saso is mostly considered as fiction, which was published under the guise of a non-verfiable legend told in a third-person experience that happened over a century ago prior to its publication.

Following Kim Pusik's initial encounter with the legend, Il-yeon mentioned in his book that Lady Saso came from a "royal family", (not necessarily alluding to the Chinese dynasties), which took another meaning of its own within Korea during the Japanese annexation period.

==== Korean accounts ====
The story of Lady Saso also revolves around a controversy surrounding false claims of her origins through nationalistic ideology in Korea which became prevalent during the Japanese occupation of Korea. According to modern Korean historians, Il-yeon's claim of “(Lady Saso) coming from a royal family” was distorted once more by a fiction oriented, pseudo-historical book, Hwandan Gogi (환단고기/ Hanja: 桓檀古記) which was first written in 1911 and later published in 1979. According to the questionable book, Hyeokgeose's mother (Lady Saso) is claimed to be Princess Paso from Buyeo.

According to Samguk Yusa, the story of Lady Saso include the terms "Gye-nong (계농)", "Gye-rim (계림)" and "Baek-ma (백마)". However, the mention of the word "Gye", found in Gye-nong and Gye-rim is first introduced in the legend of Kim Al-ji and absent in the chronologically older legend of Hyeokgeose. However, using this analogy, Gye Yeon-su, a major contributor to Hwandan Gogi claimed that Lady Saso was in fact, Princess Paso of Buyeo which elevated him (a person of the Gye family line) her descendant and of ancient Korean royalty. His claim (alongside the book itself) was heavily criticized and is now widely regarded as a work of fiction. However, it is thought that these false claims found in Samguk Yusa and Hwandan Gogi about Lady Saso is what caused her existence to become so controversial in recent times.

== Family ==
N/A	사소부인; Saso
혁거세 거서간; Hyeokgeose	알영부인; Aryeong
남해 차차웅; Namhae

== See also ==
- Heo Hwang-ok
