= Mayago =

- Personification of Mount Jiri
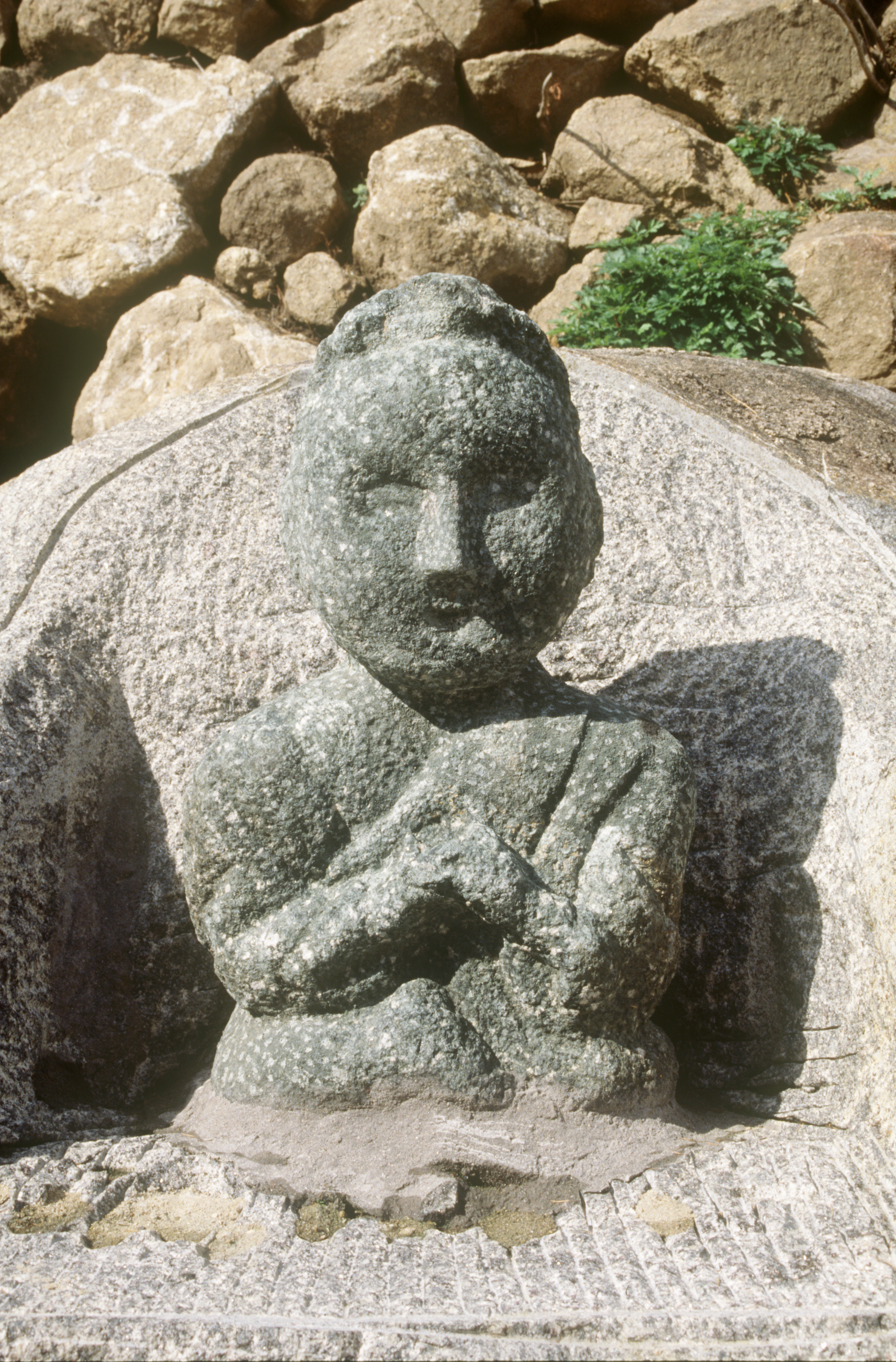
- Statue of Mayago.
- Other names: Jirisan Seongmo
- Hangul: 마야고
- Venerated in: Muism
- Affiliation: Mountain Goddess
- Abode: Mount Jiri
- Gender: Female
- Ethnic group: Koreans

Genealogy
- Children: Wang Kŏn
- Dynasty: Goryeo

Mayago (Korean: 마야고) or Jirisan Seongmo (지리산성모; 智異山聖母) is the goddess, a holy mother of Mount Jiri in Korean mythology. She is a mountain goddess, responsible for taking care of the particular mountain to which she is assigned. Mountain gods and goddesses are among the main deities to whom a Mudang or a priest(ess) prayed for good luck and harvests. Such priests and priestesses sometimes lived on the mountain, preferably as high as possible, as the height of the mountain was believed to determine how close one was to heaven and the gods who resided there. There is a story that prayers to the goddess brought an end to the rain. In mythology, she is identified with Wang Ryung, the mother of Taejo of Goryeo.

== Mythology ==
Banya was the god whom Mayago, the patron goddess of Mt. Jiri, dearly loved. Mayago would spend day after day happily weaving a magnificent regalia for Banya using threads of silk she conjured from tree bark. She anxiously waited for her lover so that she could give her gift to him.

Every time the wind blew over the Jiri mountain, Mayago saw Banya coming through the Ironstar flower fields to meet her. With her hair flying, she ran out to meet him in the sea of flowers, but her lover was nowhere to be seen.

She realized that the sight of “Banya” coming was merely the work of her imagination, caused by the movements of the flowers. Disappointed and full of anger, she burst into tears and cursed the Ironstar flowers for deceiving her, and they never blossomed again. Not ceasing her vengeance, she then ripped Banya's clothes to a million shreds and threw them into the woods. The pond on top of the mountain, in which she used to see her face every morning, dried up.

This pond later became the Sanhi(山姬) Pond (Pond of the Mountain Dryad) of the ChonHwang Peak (Peak of the Empyreal Emperor) of Jarngtuh Block (Market Block, where “Market” is a proper noun). Banya's clothes, which he never received, were seen shredded and hanging in the branches of the mountain woods, and became the parasitic PoongLan (Wind Orchid). Because all this arose from a false memory, the PoongLan(風蘭) that are indigenous to Mt. Jiri are also called HwanLan(幻蘭), or Mirage Flowers.

== See also ==
- Mago
- Mountain God
