= Najeong Well =

Historic site in Gyeongju, South Korea

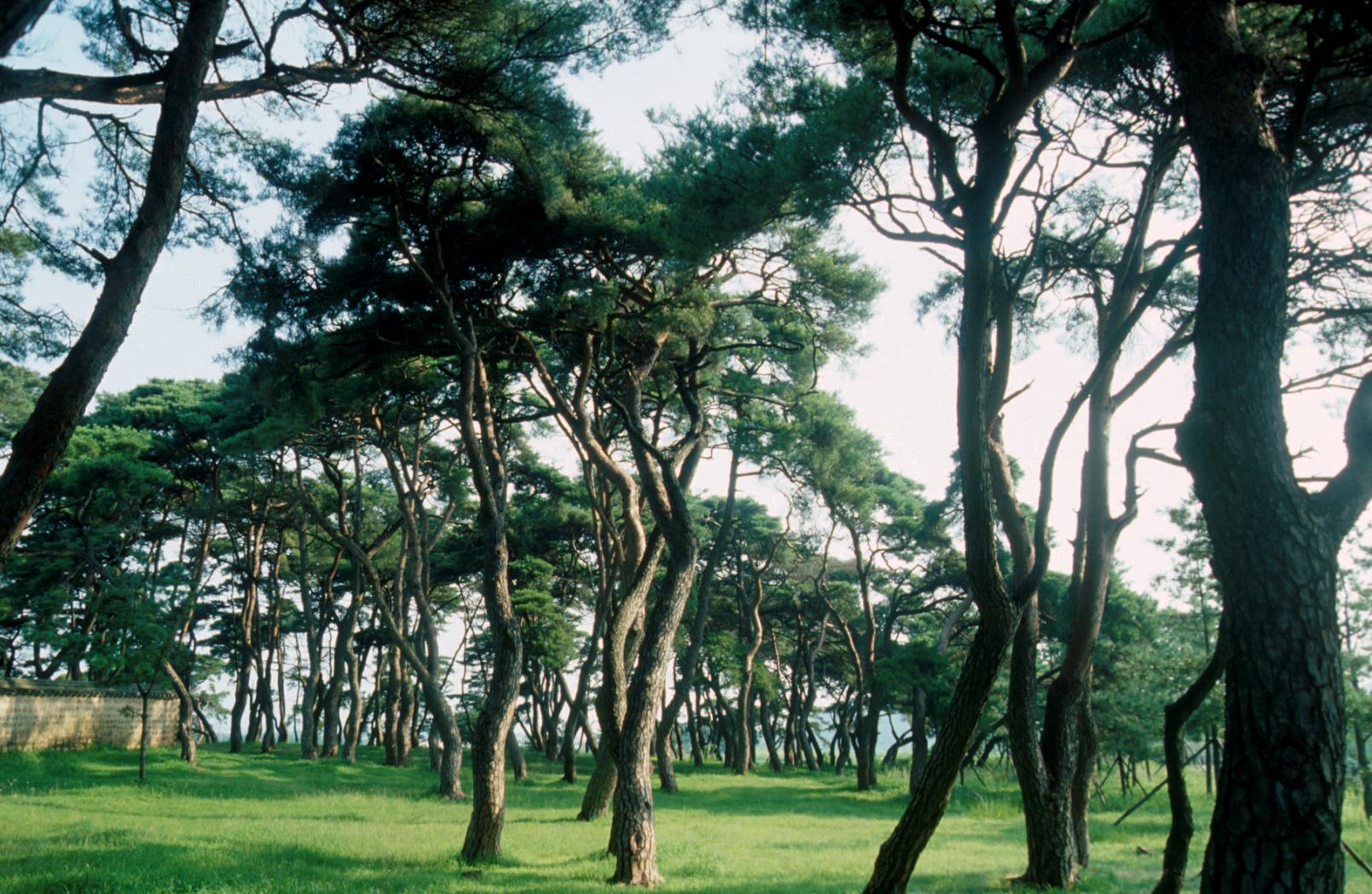
- View of the sacred forest of Najeong
- Interactive map of Najeong Well
- Location: Gyeongju, South Korea
- Coordinates: 35°48′57″N 129°12′45″E

Historic Sites of South Korea
- Designated: 1975-11-20
- Reference no.: 245

Najeong Well (Korean: 경주 나정; Hanja: 慶州蘿井), is a historic well in the forest of Najeong in Gyeongju, South Korea. On 20 November 1975, it was designated Historic Site of South Korea No. 245. The well is said to be the birthplace of Park Hyeokgeose, the founder of Silla.

== In popular culture ==
In the South Korean TV series, Hwarang: The Poet Warrior Youth, the young True bones meet here to fight, and, Najeong being a sacred place, are subject to death, a death which is avoided, by swearing to become Hwarang with allegiance not to their families but to Silla and its king.

== Gallery ==
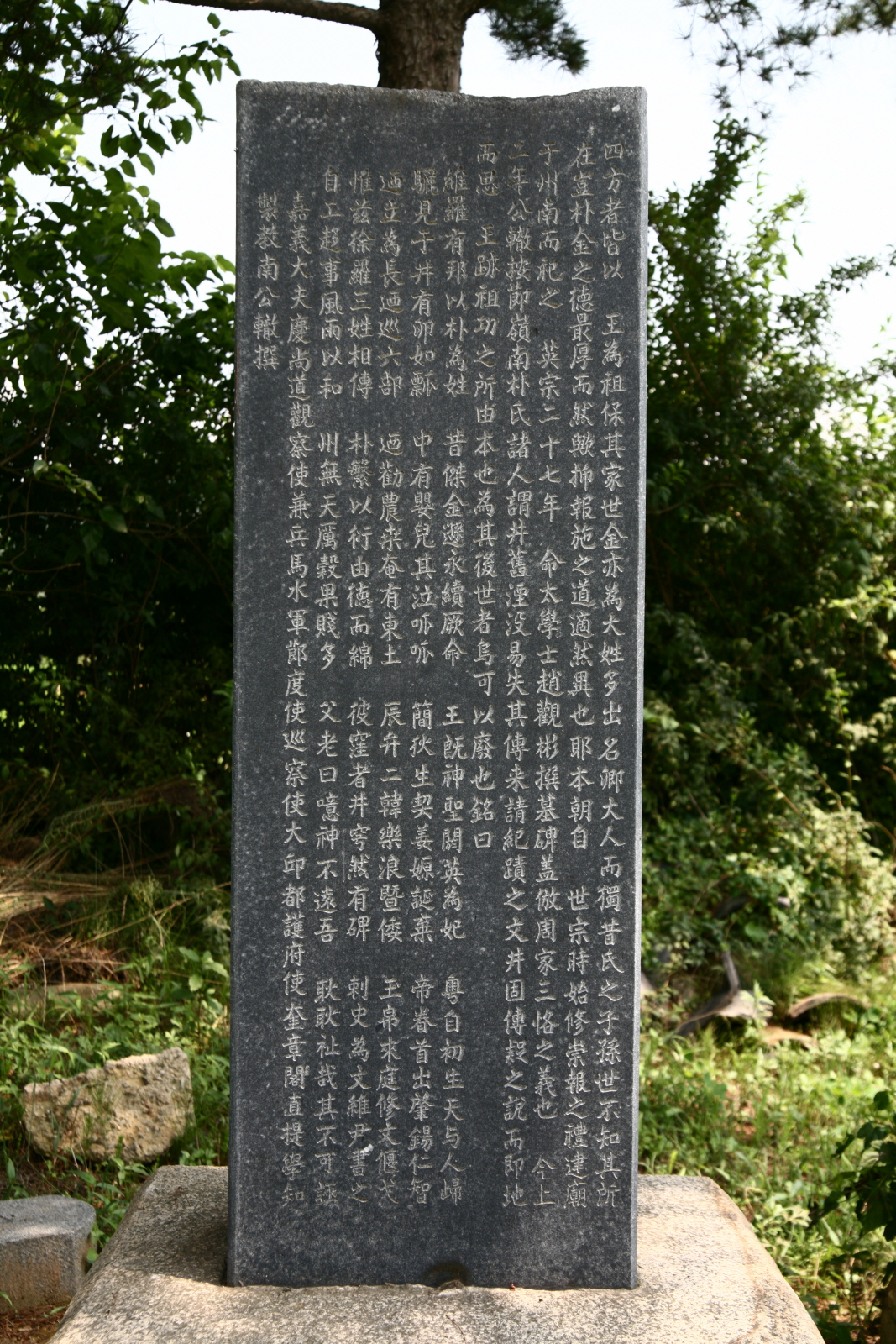

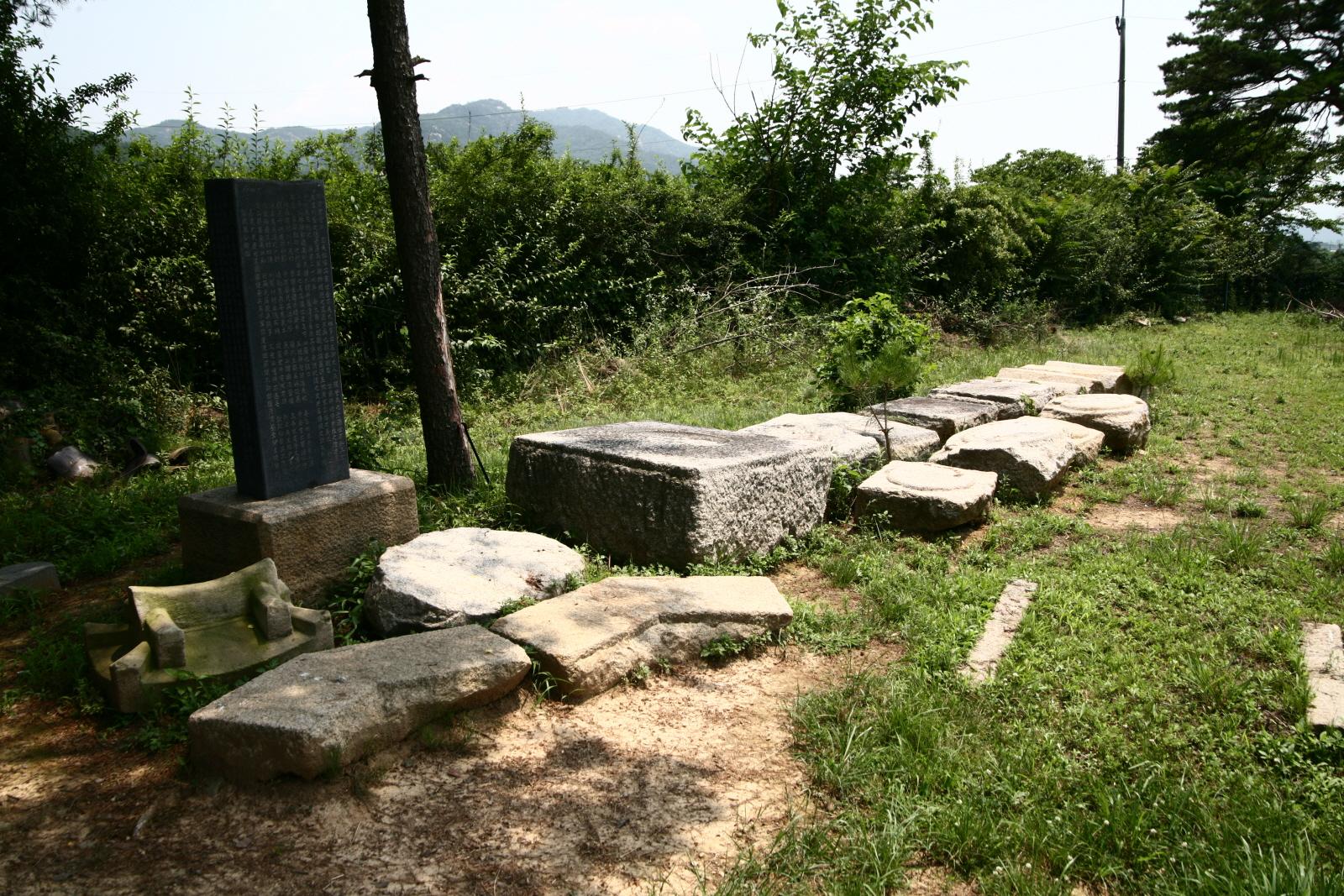

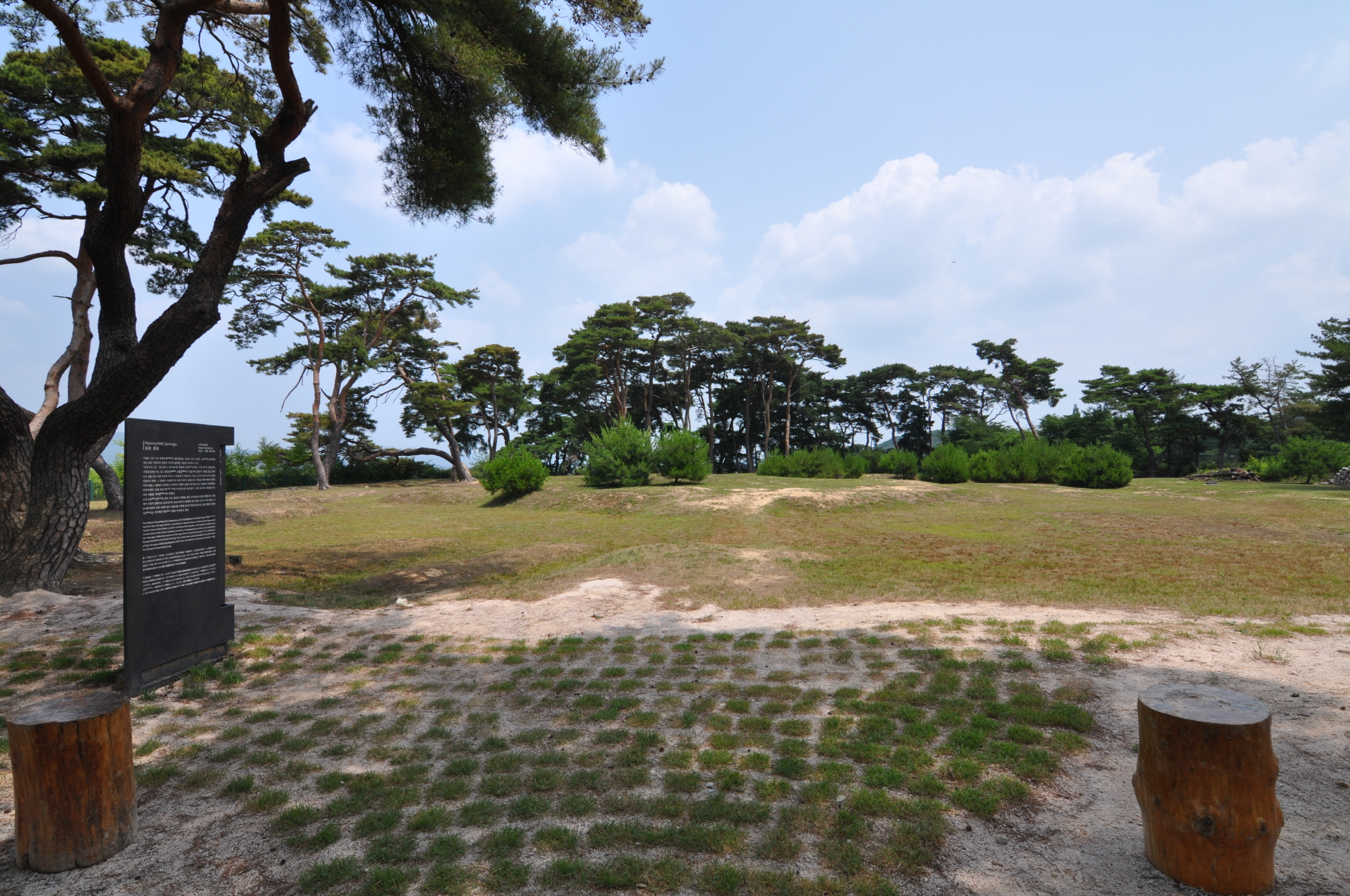
