= Seolmundae Halmang =

Goddess in Jeju mythology

- Creator Goddess of Jeju Island
- Hangul: 설문대할망
- Venerated in: Muism
- Gender: Female
- Region: Jeju Island
- Ethnic group: Jejuans

Equivalents
- Mainland: Mago Halmi

Seolmundae Halmang (Korean: 설문대할망) is a creator goddess, a holy mother in the mythology of Jeju Island. She features prominently in Jeju shamanism. There are a diverse array of stories surrounding her, with many describing her creating the various geological features of Jeju Island. Her stories are said to have elements of both mythology and tall tales; legends attribute both divine and human properties to her, including mortality.

== Names ==
Her name has been rendered in a variety of other spellings, including Seolmandugo (설만두고; 雪慢頭姑), Seonmundae Halmang (선문대할망), Seolmundae Halmang (설문데할망; different Korean spelling), Seolmyeongdae Halmang (설명대할망), Seolmyeongji Halmang (설명지할망), Seonmaengdui Halmang (선맹듸할망), Saemyeongdu Halmang (세명두할망), Saemyeongju Halmang (세명주할망), Sswemengdui Halmang (쒜멩듸할망), Seolmyeongdu Halmang (설명두할망), and Saemyeongdwi Halmang (세명뒤할망).

== Description ==
She is attested to in the 18th century texts Pyohaerok and Tamnaji, and has been told of in oral tradition. Pyohaerok possibly contains the oldest known mention of her; in the text, people pray to a goddess called Seonma Seonpa (선마선파; 詵麻仙婆), who likely corresponds to her.

Some legends have it that she was a filial daughter of the Jade Emperor, although she descended from the heavens to create Jeju against the will of her parents.

She is said to be fantastically giant. When she laid down, using the island's main volcano Hallasan as her pillow, her toes were said to reach Gwantalseom. Some legends have it that no matter what body of water she stood in, the water would never go above her knees. In some legends, she is said to have been married to a male counterpart called Seolmundae Hareubang (설문대하르방); this counterpart was likely invented after her.

There are a number of legends about her, many of which are related to the geological features of the island. It is said that she created Jeju Island by gathering up dirt in her chima (Korean skirt) and pouring it into the sea. The dirt formed the around 360 oreum (small extinct volcanoes) of the island. The last volcano she created was Hallasan; she poured dirt several times to create it. The mountain's top was said to initially be so sharp, it fell off and formed the nearby mountain Sanbangsan. The hollowed-out crater on top became Hallasan's Baengnokdam. Similarly, she was said to have punched the top off Darangswi Oreum to create its volcanic crater. The stone structure called Deunggyeongdol (등경돌; lit. 'light hanging rock') near Seongsan Ilchulbong is said to have been where Seolmundae Halmang hung a lamp while sewing. She accidentally created a large hole on the island Gwantalseom with her feet. One legend has it that she created the ocean around Jeju by placing one foot each on Hallasan and Gwantalseom and urinating; by this process, the island Udo was created.

It is said that she once offered to create a bridge to the mainland for the people of Jeju, if they created for her one set of undergarments. The Jejuans fell just short of their goal, so she did not complete the bridge for them; the remains of the bridge are said to be off the coast of Jocheon-eup in Jeju City.

There are several legends about her dying. One legend has it that she died after getting trapped in a swamp on Hallasan. Another legend has it that she fell into a pot of juk (rice porridge) that she was preparing for her 500 sons and died. Heartbroken, her sons then became the 500 Yeongsil Rocks. Another has it that she drowned near Seogwipo.

== See also ==
- Jeju Province#Society and culture
