= Pasa of Silla =

King of Silla from 80 to 112

King Pasa 파사 이사금 婆娑尼師今
- Isageum
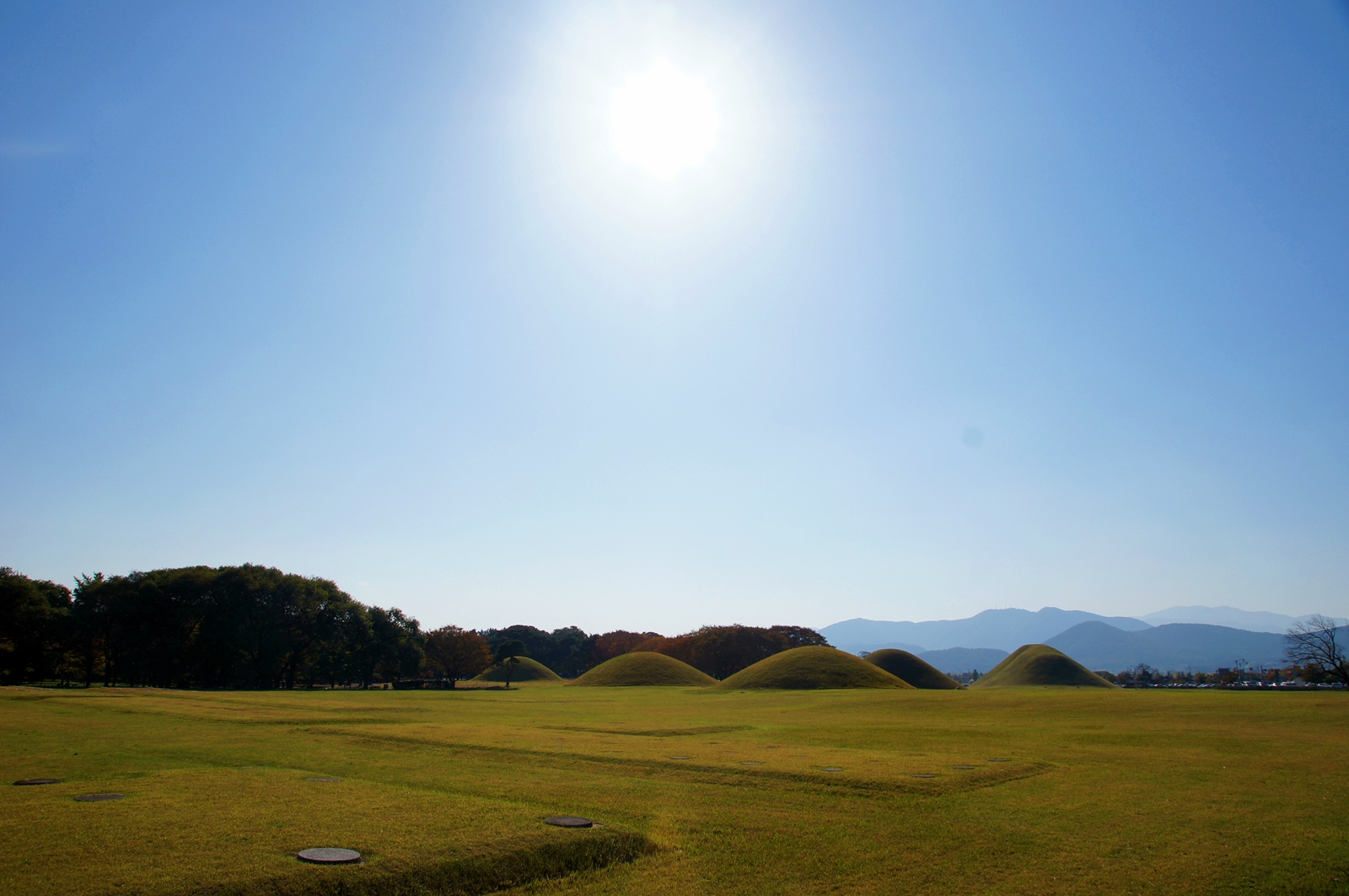
- Tomb of King Pasa

Ruler of Silla
- Reign: 80–112
- Coronation: 80
- Predecessor: Talhae of Silla
- Successor: Jima of Silla
- Born: Unknown
- Died: 112; Silla
Posthumous name
- King Pasa (파사 이사금; 婆娑尼師今)
- Father: Yuri of Silla
- Mother: Queen Kim

- Pasa of Silla
- Hangul: 파사 이사금
- Hanja: 婆娑尼師今
- RR: Pasa isageum
- MR: P'asa isagŭm

Pasa of Silla (died 112, r. 80–112) was the fifth ruler of Silla, one of the Three Kingdoms of Korea. He is commonly called Pasa Isageum, isageum being the royal title in early Silla. As a descendant of Silla's founder Hyeokgeose, his surname was Bak.

== Family ==
- Grandfather: King Namhae of Silla (남해)
- Grandmother: Lady Unje (알영부인)
- Father: Yuri Isageum (유리 이사금), or Yuri's brother Naro.
- Mother: unnamed queen
- Consort and issue(s):
  - Queen Saseong, of the Kim clan (사성부인 김씨)
    - Jima of Silla (지마 이사금, d.134), 1st son

== Background ==
According to the Samguk sagi, Pasa Isageum(婆娑尼師今) became king. He is the second son of king Yuri(儒理王). He married Lady sasung(史省).

Pasa Isageum's Pasa(婆娑) is a Buddhist name, meaning 'truth appears' in Sanskrit. However, since it is long before Buddhism was introduced to Silla, it is likely that the Chinese character meaning was added later on. Pasa(婆娑) is rendering of a Chinese character for pronounce In Nihon Shoki's Empress Jingū part, characters are recorded as different pasa(波沙)(the same pronounce) because they are rendering of a Chinese character, which is more important than the meaning of Chinese characters. But, it is highly likely that the Japanese Historian's Pasa(波沙寐錦) was confused with Silseong Maripgan the Japanese historian who lacked an understanding of early Silla history.

== Reign ==
In 87, he built Silla's first recorded castles outside of the Gyeongju region.

In 94, when the adjacent Gaya confederacy attacked, Pasa sent 1,000 cavalry to respond. When the Gaya attacked again two years later, he personally led a force of 5,000 to another victory. Pasa was subsequently appeased by an emissary from Gaya, but maintained superiority over the confederacy.

In 101, the Wolseong royal fortress was first constructed and would continue to be used until the fall of Silla. Portions of this fortress are still preserved in central Gyeongju.

The next year, Silla gained control over the previously independent states of Siljikgok (present-day Samcheok), Eumjipbeol (present-day northern Gyeongju), and Apdok (present-day Gyeongsan). Six years later he took over the states of Biji (present-day Hapcheon), Dabeol (present-day Pohang), and Chopal (present-day Changwon) as well.

The rival Korean kingdom of Baekje had attacked in 85, but Pasa made peace with Giru of Baekje in 105.

== See also ==
- Three Kingdoms of Korea
- Proto–Three Kingdoms of Korea
- History of Korea
- Rulers of Korea
- Conquest of Jinhan by Silla
- Gaya - Silla Wars

Pasa of Silla House of Park Died: 112
Regnal titles
Preceded by Talhae	Ruler of Silla; 80–112	Succeeded by Jima
