= Jirisan =

Second tallest mountain in South Korea

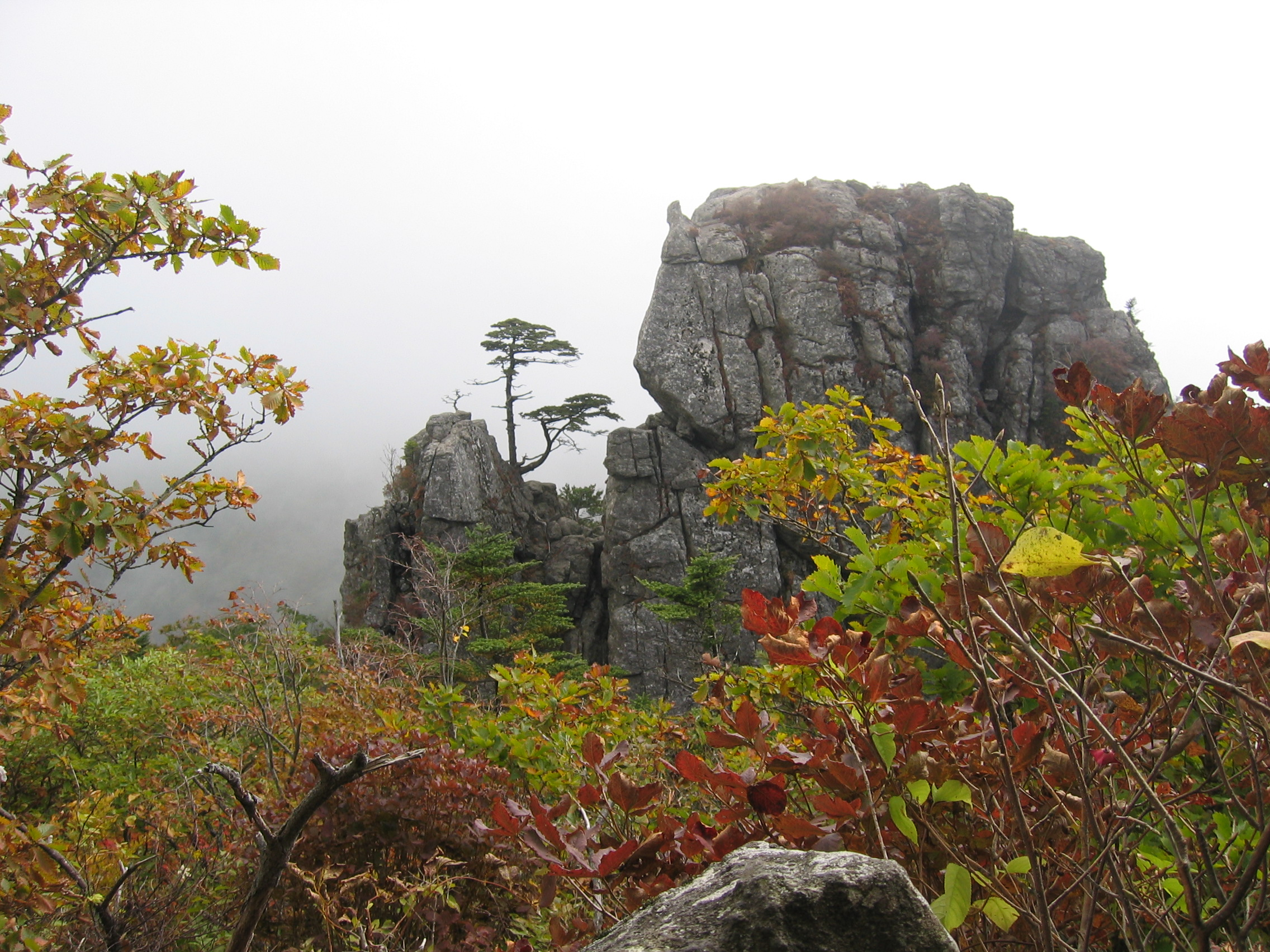

Highest point
- Elevation: 1,915 m (6,283 ft)
- Prominence: 1,696 m (5,564 ft)
- Listing: Ultra, Ribu
- Coordinates: 35°20′13″N 127°43′50″E

Geography
- Location: South Korea
- Parent range: Sobaek Mountains

Climbing
- Easiest route: Hike

Korean name
- Hangul: 지리산
- Hanja: 智異山
- RR: Jirisan
- MR: Chirisan

Jirisan (Korean: 지리산) is a mountain located in the southern region of South Korea. It is the second-tallest mountain in South Korea after Jeju Island's Hallasan, and is the tallest mountain in mainland South Korea.

The 1915m-high mountain is located in Jirisan National Park. The park spans three provinces: (North and South Jeolla Province and South Gyeongsang Province). It is the largest in South Korea. The largest proportion of the national park is in South Gyeongsang. The highest peak of the mountain, Cheonwangbong is also located in this province. Another well-known peak is Samsinbong (Three Spirits Peak).

Jirisan is at the southern end of the Sobaek and Baekdu-daegan mountain ranges, the "spine" of the Korean Peninsula incorporating the Sobaek mountain range and most of the Taebaek mountain range.

There are seven major Buddhist temples on Jirisan. Hwaeomsa is the largest and best-known temple among these. It contains several national treasures, mostly stone artworks from about 600–900 CE. The mountain is also home to the Cheonghak-dong (Azure Crane Village) alpine valley, which includes the Samseonggung (Three Sages Palace), which is a site celebrating one of Korea's foundation myths.

Every year more than 280,000 people visit Jirisan. Summer and autumn are the most popular visiting seasons. The mountain is advertised as having ten scenic views. These are 'Sunrise from Cheonwang-bong peak', 'Nogodan Sea of Clouds', 'Banyabong's Nakjo', 'Full moon at Byukso-ryung', 'Piagol Autumn Leaves', 'Royal Azalea Blossoming', 'Chilseon Valley', 'Seomjincheongryu', 'Buril water fall', 'Yeonha-Sunkyung'. Jirisan National Park has several hiking routes.

== Legends ==
At the entrance to Baemsagol Valley, some 1,300 years ago, there used to be Songnimsa Temple. This temple practiced an annual rite on the Chilwolbaekjung holiday (full moon day of July by the lunar calendar) wherein they selected the most pious monk and prayed earnestly for his safe passage to paradise as a deity. In a certain year, the then highest monk Seosandaesa visited the temple, heard about this Buddhist rite, and guessed that there must be a secret behind it. Seosandesa allowed that year's chosen monk to pray wearing a silk robe anointed with poison, linked by a silk thread to Sinseodae Terrace. Seosandaesa then hid himself behind a rock to watch. At around 1 am, an imugi anaconda, which was sorry not to have turned into a dragon, slithered up from the valley below Sinseondae Terrace to the sound of roaring water. The imugi jumped upon the praying monk, bit him in the mouth, and disappeared into the water. Seosandaesa returned to the temple, and waited until dawn. Early in the morning, he, together with the villagers, went to Sinseondae Terrace to find that the imugi had died, having failed to swallow the whole body of the monk. Seosandaesa discovered Songnimsa Temple's secret of sacrificing a monk to an imugi every year. Thereafter, the valley was named Baemsagol, which means the valley where an imugi, which failed to become a dragon, died. The village at the entrance to Baemsagol Valley was named Banseon (meaning a "half deity") in memory of the dead monk because he was sacrificed without becoming a deity.

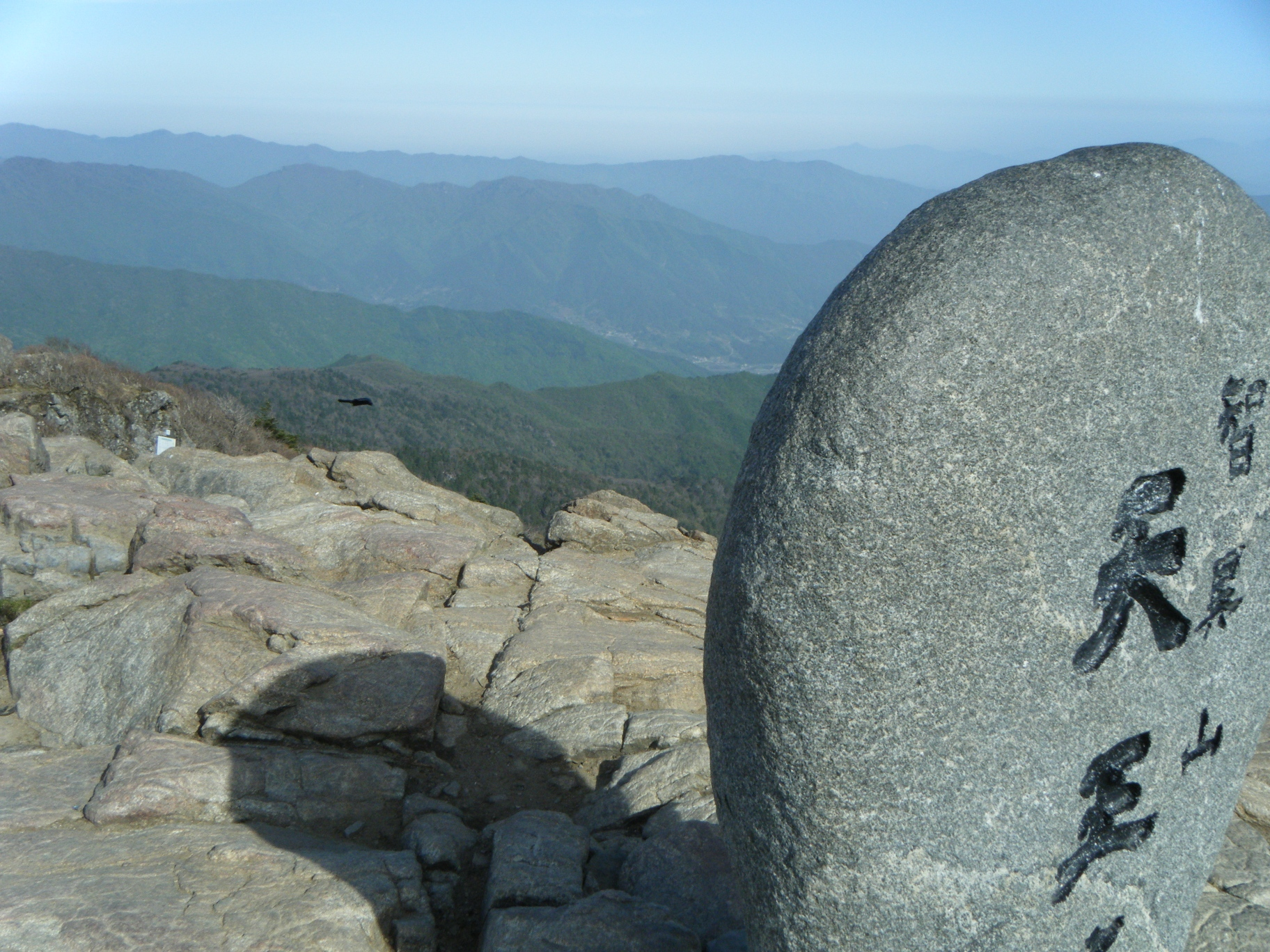
Jirisan peak

== Peaks ==
Samshinbong (bong means "peak") is 1,284 m (4,213 ft) high and a popular, but strenuous, day-hike from the Ssanggye Temple entry point (it is the closest major peak from this trailhead). From Ssanggyesa, a trail winds up 2.3 km to Bul-il Falls. From the left turn in the path just before the waterfall, the track continues 6.9 km to the peak (for a grand round-trip total of 18.4 km). Starting from Ssanggyesa (the sa suffix indicates a Buddhist temple), the peak can be reached in four hours at a steady pace. There is a helipad near the summit for emergency services. It takes about three hours to get down; it is an extremely steep hike. Climbers are advised to bring plenty of water as it is only available from streams beyond the temple grounds. This peak can also be climbed from the back of Cheonghak-dong Village.

== History ==
During the Korean War, North Korean troops occupied the region in 1950. After the United Nations forces took the area in 1951, a considerable number of North Koreans remained in the mountains, where they continued a guerrilla war, until they were finally beaten in 1955, two years after the Korean Armistice Agreement was signed by the belligerents. South Korea issued an "Anti-Guerrilla Warfare Service Medal" for its troops who fought in the area and a movie about the fighting was later produced. An earlier film, Piagol, about a group of North Korean soldiers in the area, was released the year the fighting ended.

== Ecosystem ==
Jirisan is known to grow about 1,500 kinds of plants, many of which are endemic. This is the largest growth of plants in South Korea except for Mt. Halla.

Some plants were first found in Mt. Jiri and have 'Jirisan' or 'Jirisan'. However, some plants do not have 'geori' or 'geori' attached to them even though they were first found on Mt. Jiri.

Asian Black Bears, nearly extirpated from South Korea, have been successfully reintroduced to Jirisan with a resident population of around ~100 animals.

Jirisan is also one of the few known habitats of Northern nutcrackers in Korea, along with Seoraksan.

== Gallery ==
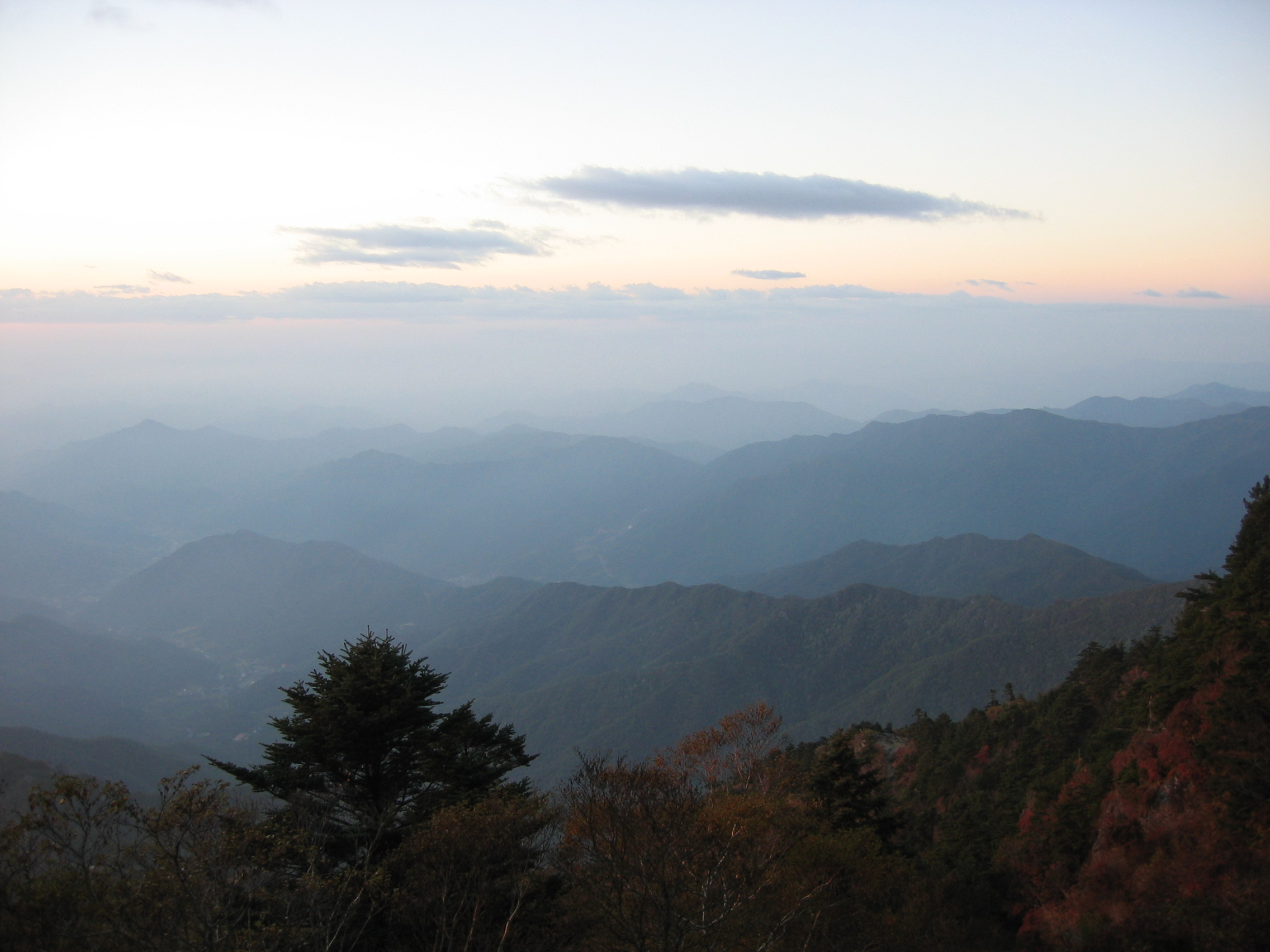
Jirisan National Park

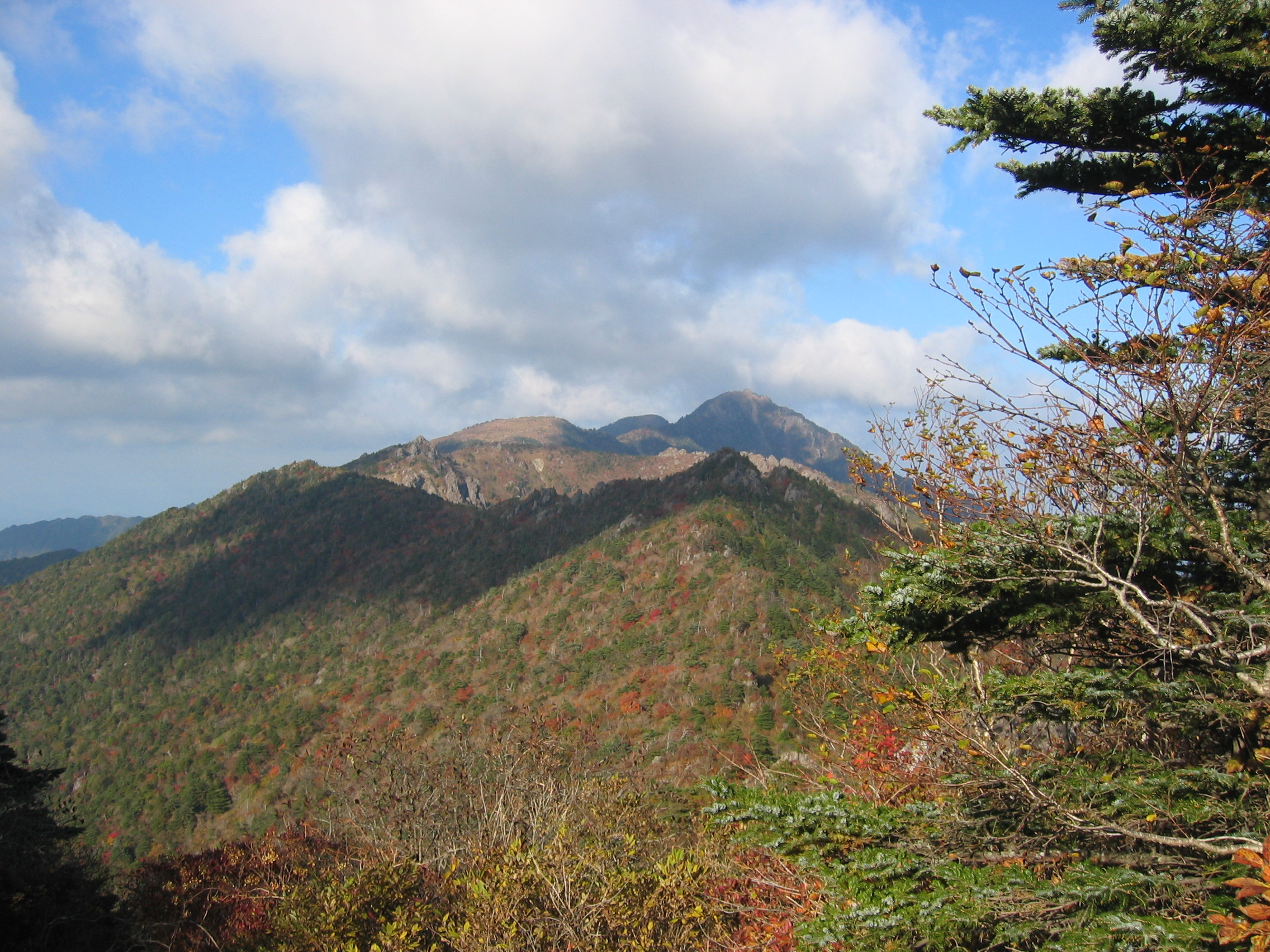

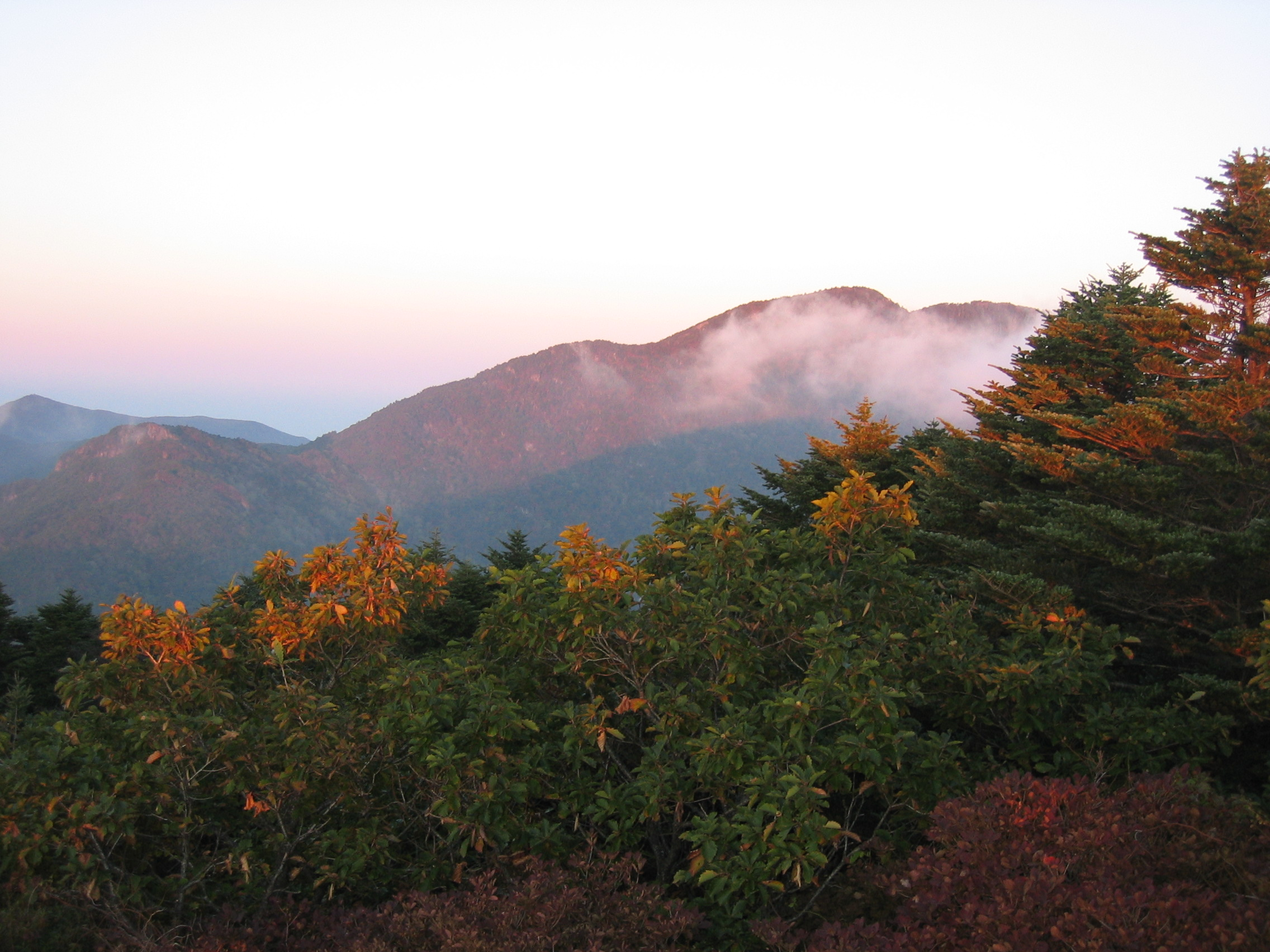

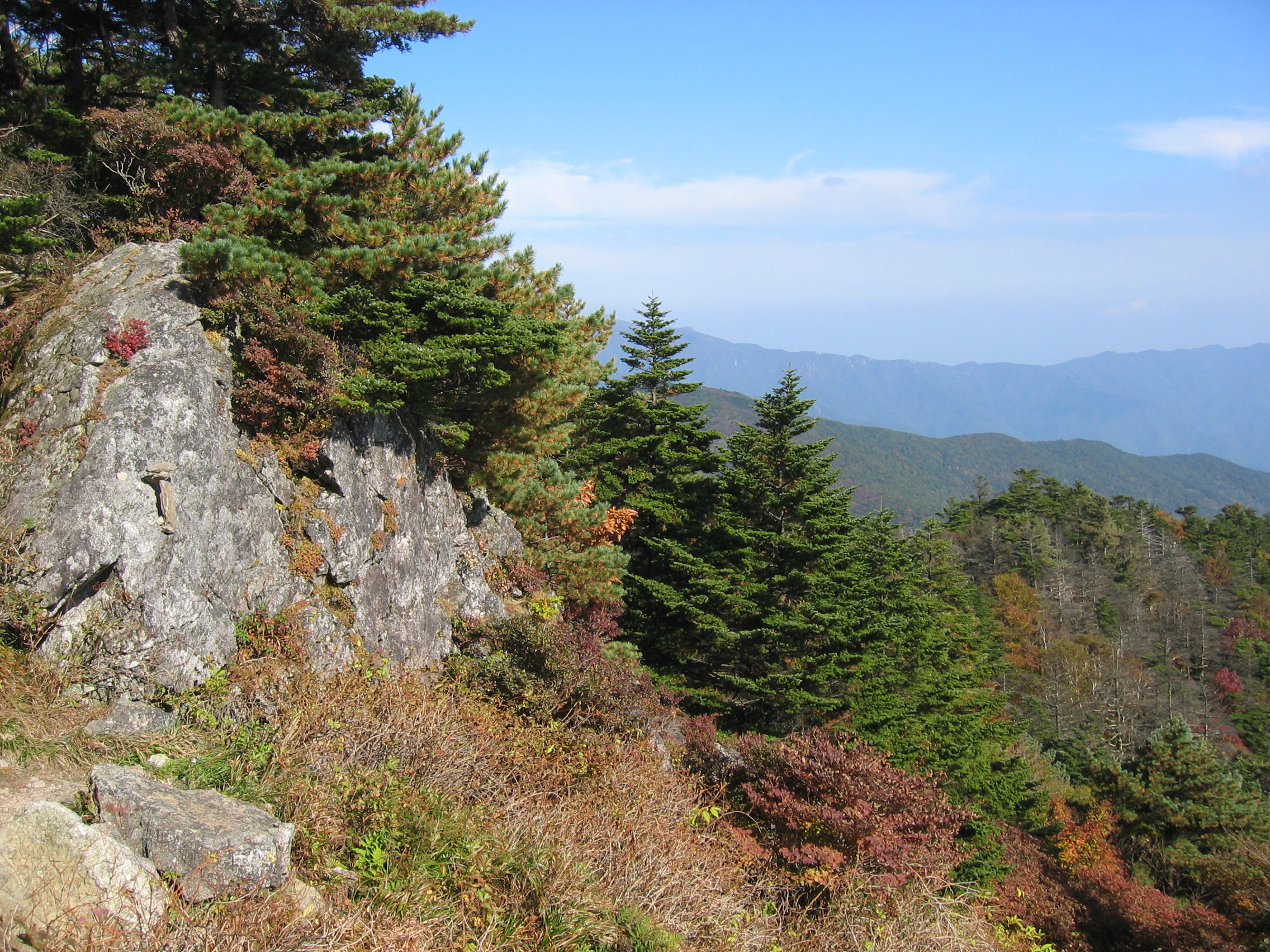

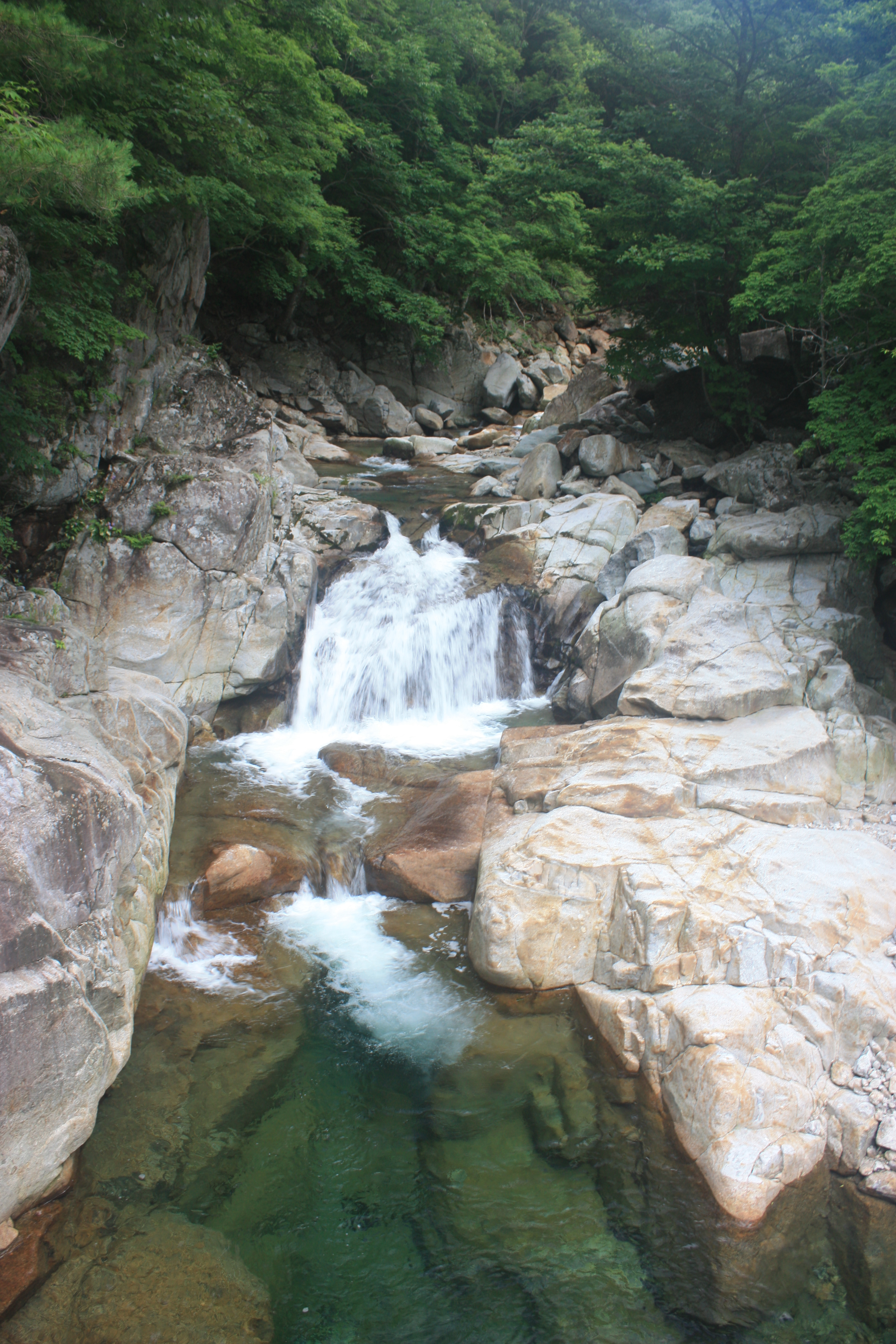
Baemsagol valley

== See also ==
- National parks of South Korea
- List of mountains in Korea
- Geography of South Korea
- Mayago
- Korea Forest Service
- Jirisan (TV series)
