= Il-yeon =

Korean Buddhist monk (1206–1289)

- Hangul: 일연
- Hanja: 一然
- RR: Ilyeon
- MR: Iryŏn

Il-yeon (Korean: 일연; 1206–1289), also spelled Iryeon, was a Korean Buddhist monk and All-Enlightened National Preceptor (보각국사; 普覺國師) during the Goryeo Dynasty of Korea. His birth name was either Kim Gyeong-myeong (金景明) or Jeon Gyeon-myeong (全見明), and his courtesy name was Hoe-yeon (晦然).

He became a monk at the temple Muryangsa at the age of nine and passed the Seon national examination at 22. At 54, he was given the rank of Great Teacher. When he was 78, King Chungnyeol offered him a position of rank and tried to make him National Preceptor, but Il-yeon declined. The king again appointed him National Preceptor, and Il-yeon came down to the capital Kaesong (then Gaegyeong) but soon returned to the mountains on the pretext that his aged mother was sick. On the eighth day of the seventh month in 1289, he held a conference with various monks and then died.

Il-yeon is known as a prolific writer, and according to the inscription on his tombstone, he wrote around 80 volumes on Buddhist topics. Today only one book of his survives: Samguk yusa, which is not mentioned in the inscription formally.

== See also ==
- List of Goryeo people
- History of Korea
