= Namhae of Silla =

King of Silla from 4 to 24 AD

Namhae 남해 南解
- Chachaung
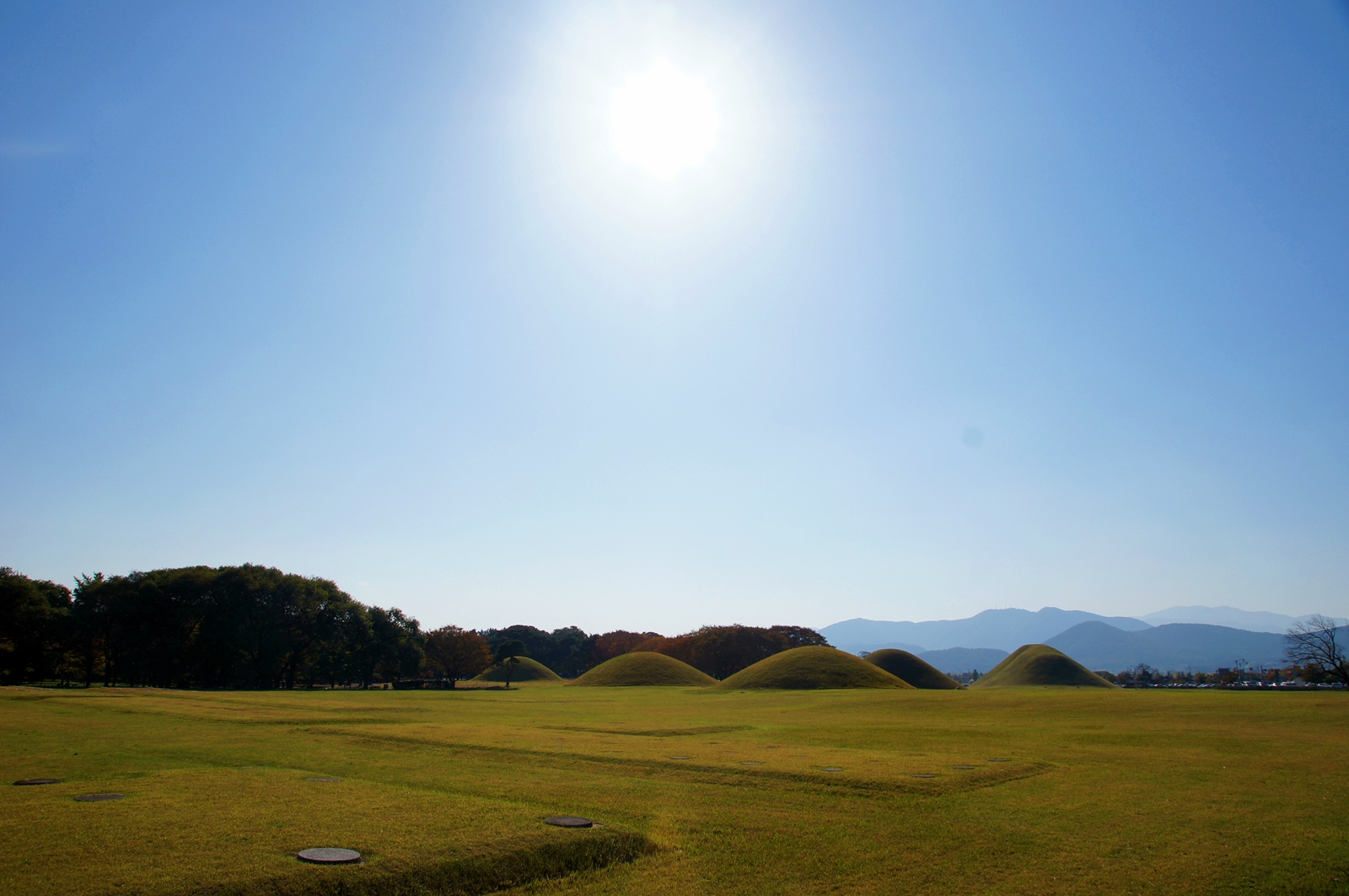
- Tomb of King Namhae

Ruler of Silla
- Reign: 4–24
- Predecessor: Hyeokgeose
- Successor: Yuri
- Died: 24
- Spouse: Lady Unje
- Dynasty: Silla Dynasty
- Father: Hyeokgeose
- Mother: Lady Aryeong

- Namhae of Silla
- Hangul: 남해 차차웅
- Hanja: 南解 次次雄
- RR: Namhae chachaung
- MR: Namhae ch'ach'aung

Namhae (?–24, r. 4–24 CE) was the second King of Silla, one of the Three Kingdoms of Korea. He is commonly called Namhae Chachaung, chachaung being an early Silla title.

Namhae is the only king who is called Chachaung. According to the Samguk sagi, Kim Taemun explained that the title "Chachaung" meant a shaman in Old Korean.

== Background ==
He was the eldest son of Park Hyeokgeose, Silla's founder, and Lady Aryeong. His surname was Park, and his wife was Lady Unje (운제; 雲帝). Alternatively, the Book of Sui, a Chinese history book compiled during the reign of Taizong of Tang, suggests that Namhae actually originated from Baekje. Historians theorize that Namhae was a Baekje priest who either was expelled from Baekje and settled in Silla. the Samguk yusa records that Namhae violently usurped King Hyeokgeose by killing him, thus becoming the second king of Silla.

== Reign ==
His reign was characterized by a series of foreign invasions. In 4, the Lelang army surrounded Geumseong, the Sillan capital, but was repelled.

In 8, when the Namhae of Silla heard that Talhae was benevolent, he married his eldest daughter to him.

The Wa of Japan invaded Silla in 14, and while Silla stopped them, Lelang invaded again. A comet shower was said to have scared the Lelang soldiers, however, and they retreated. (Note: 三國史記 新羅本紀 南解 次次雄 十一年 倭人遣兵船百餘艘 掠海邊民戶 發六部勁兵 以禦之 樂浪謂內虛 來攻金城 甚急 夜有流星 墜於賊營 衆懼而退 屯於閼川之上 造石堆二十而去 六部兵一千人追之 自吐含山東 至閼川 見石堆 知賊衆 乃止: In 14, the Wa people sent about 100 warships to plunder houses on the beach, so they sent soldiers to defend them. The situation was in an emergency when Nakrang regarded it as an opportunity and attacked the capital(Geumseong). At night, when the meteor fell into the enemy's camp, the enemy soldier retreated in fear. While stationed on the side of Alcheon Stream, they piled up 20 piles of stones and retreated. 1,000 soldiers chased them, and when they reached Alcheon river from the east of Mt.Toham(吐含山), they saw this pile of stones and thought there were many enemy groups, so they stopped chasing.)

The Bukmyeong(北溟) people plowed the fields and got Royal Seal of Ye (예왕지인; 濊王之印), previously used by Buyeo's kings, and dedicated it to Silla in 19. It is not clear where Bukmyeong means.

He was buried in Sareung-won.

== Family ==
Parents

- Father: Hyeokgeose
  - Grandmother: Lady Saso
- Mother: Lady Aryeong (알영부인)
  - Grandmother: Lady Saso
- Younger sister: Lady Aro

Consort and their respective issue:

- Lady Unje (운제부인)
  - Ilji Galmulwang (일지 갈문왕), 1st son
  - Yuri Isageum (?–57, r. 24–57), 2nd son
  - Third son
  - Princess Ani, Queen Ahyo (아효부인 박씨), 1st daughter
    - married Seok Tal-hae of the Gyeongju Seok clan (경주 석씨)

== Family tree ==
N/A	사소부인; Saso
혁거세 거서간; Hyeokgeose	알영부인; Aryeong
남해 차차웅; Namhae

== In popular culture ==
- Portrayed by Kwon Sung-duk in 2010 MBC TV series Kim Su-ro, The Iron King.

== See also ==
- History of Korea
- List of Korean monarchs

Namhae of Silla House of Park Died: 24
Regnal titles
Preceded by Hyeokgeose	Ruler of Silla; 4–24	Succeeded by Yuri
