= Mago Halmi =

Giant goddess of creation in Korean mythology

- Goddess of Creation
- Hangul: 마고할미
- Venerated in: Muism
- Gender: Female
- Region: Korean Peninsula
- Ethnic group: Koreans

Equivalents
- Chinese: Magu
- Jejuan: Seolmundae Halmang

In Korean mythology, Mago Halmi (Korean: 마고할미; lit. 'Grandmother Mago') is a giant goddess of creation. She is an earth goddess and creator goddess, sometimes associated with splitting the heaven and earth. "Mago" is likely related to Taoist goddess Magu, and she is also called Seolmundae, Seogu, and Angadak in other regions of Korea.

Mago appears in a number of sources, including the pseudo-historical Budoji, folklore, place-names, art, classical literature, folksongs, shamanic songs (muga), historical and religious texts, and miscellaneous data.

A small number of folkloric narratives from Korea associate Mago with hemp, and according to the pseudo historical work Budoji, Korean mytho-history began with the "Era of Mago". In one story, Mago is portrayed as the cosmic weaver who descends in the region (Jinhae, South Gyeongsang) to herald the season of weaving hemp. In other stories, she is said to be the giant cosmogonist, weaving with islands and rocks taking as the spindle and the loom shuttle. Undoubtedly, Magoists regarded hemp as a sacred plant and used it for various purposes (food, clothes, medicines, and rituals). It was also used as means of currency from the time of Joseon (2333–232 BCE).
