= Hyeokgeose of Silla =

Founding King of Silla (r. 57 BC – 4 AD)

Hyeokgeose 혁거세 赫居世
- Geoseokan
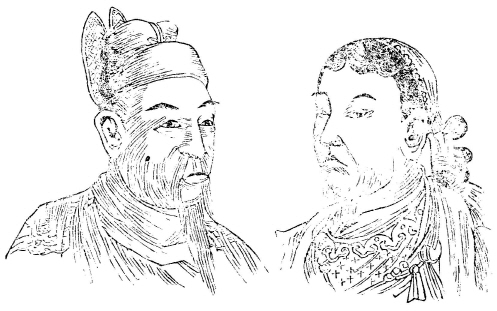
- Portrait of Hyeokgeose

Ruler of Silla
- Tenure: 57 BC – 4 AD
- Predecessor: None
- Successor: Namhae
- Born: 69 BC
- Died: 4 AD (aged 73)
- Burial: Gyeongju Oreung (Five Tombs)
- Spouse: Lady Aryeong
- Issue: Namhae of Silla
Names
- Bak Hyeokgeose
Era name and dates
- Three Kingdoms: 57 BC – 668 AD
- Dynasty: Silla Dynasty
- Mother: Lady Saso

Korean name
- Hangul: 박혁거세 거서간
- Hanja: 朴赫居世居西干
- RR: Bak Hyeokgeose geoseogan
- MR: Pak Hyŏkkŏse kŏsŏgan

Hyeokgeose (69 BC – 4 AD, r. 57 BC–4 AD), also known by his personal full name as Bak (Park, Pak) Hyeokgeose (朴赫居世), was the founding monarch of Silla, one of the Three Kingdoms of Korea. He was the progenitor of all Bak (Park) clans in Korea.

== Name ==
His title Geoseo-khan (거서간; 居西干) or Geoseul-han (거슬한; 居瑟邯), means "ruler" or "king" in the language of the Jinhan confederacy, the group of chiefdoms in the southeast of the Korean Peninsula.

"Hyeokgeose" was not a personal name, but the hanja for his honorific name, pronounced "Bulgeunae" (불그내; 弗矩内) in archaic Korean, meaning "bright world." 赫 hyeok, a Chinese character that means "bright, radiant, glowing" (from doubling the character for 赤 jeok "red"), is used to transcribe the Korean adjective stem 븕 bylg- > 붉 bulg- "red" (< ancient Korean word for "red; brightly colored; bright," related to Korean 블 byl > 불 bul "fire" and ᄇᆞᆰ bawlg- > 밝 balg- "bright, light"). 居 geo, a Chinese character that means "live, dwell, reside, sit," is used to transcribe the Korean prenominal adjective inflection ㄴ -n ~ 은 -eun "~ that is (bright/red), ~ which is (bright/red)." 世 se, a Chinese character that means "a generation; spanning many generations, one generation after another, longstanding, hereditary; a world, all the people living in the world; an epoch, an era, a period, an age; a lifetime; a dynasty, a reign, a regime" is used to transcribe an ancient word related to the obsolescent Korean word 뉘 nuy ~ 누리 nuri "world" (which, according to the Samguk yusa, has been used in this context in the sense of "governance, rule").

The surname of Hyeokgeose is Park, which is believed to have stemmed from the aforementioned "밝 (balg)" meaning "bright", and is represented with the character "朴" meaning "gourd". Scholars such as Kim So-un (김소운), a pro-Japanese Korean historian, posited that Hyeokgeose was Hogong, a Japanese individual who was Hyeokgeose's personal minister, based on the fact that the characters for "Park (朴)" and Hogong's surname "Ho (瓠)" all shared the meaning of "gourd". However, this theory is considered unlikely as the sources claim that both individuals existed concurrently and provide accounts of the two interacting with one another.

== Founding legend ==
The Samguk sagi and Samguk yusa describe the founding of Silla by Hyeokgeose.

Refugees of Gojoseon lived in the valleys of present-day Gyeongsang Province, South Korea, in six villages called Yangsan (양산촌; 楊山村), Goheo (고허촌; 高墟村), Jinji (진지촌; 珍支村), Daesu (대수촌; 大樹村), Gari (가리촌; 加利村), and Goya (고야촌; 高耶村).

In 69 BC, the heads of the six chiefdoms gathered to discuss forming a kingdom and selecting a king. In the forest, at a well called Najeong at Yangsan, a strange light shone from the sky (some accounts describe the simultaneous rising of the sun and moon, as well as a volcanic eruption), and a white horse descended. Chief Sobeolgong of Goheo discovered a large egg there. A boy came out of the egg, and when bathed, his body radiated light and birds and beasts danced. The egg was gourd-shaped, which has been posited as the origin of the Bak (Park, Pak) name, as it aligns with the Korean word for gourd (박, bak).

Sobeolgong raised him, and the six chieftains revered him. The chieftains made him king when he became 13 years old. The state was named Seorabeol.

Upon becoming king, he married Lady Aryeong, who is said to have been born from the ribs of a dragon.

== Historical context ==
This legend reflects developments in the city-state stage, the six chieftains representing a loose group of Gojoseon refugees. The story implies the ascendency of the Bak clan over the native peoples, and may indicate horse and sun worship.

The founding date is widely questioned today, as the Samguk sagi which was written in 13th century from the viewpoint of Silla, claiming Silla's superiority and antiquity over Goguryeo and Baekje. Silla in this traditional thinking is thought to have been founded first, followed by Goguryeo, and then Baekje. Archaeological evidence, however, paints a different picture, and it is suspected that Goguryeo is the oldest of the three kingdoms, with Silla developing either concurrently with Baekje or after it.

According to the ‘’Samguk Sagi’’, the six surnames of Gojoseon were Lee, Choi, Jeong, Son, Bae, and Seol. However, the Lee surname is actually a surname of the Tang emperor. The earliest record of the Lee surname dates back to the 22nd year of Silla King Gyeongdeok (AD 763). The Bae surname first appeared in AD 608 as the surname of an envoy sent by the Sui Dynasty to Japan. The Tang Dynasty's general who had been Silla was named Xue Rengui, as same as Seol(Zh: Xue) surname to appear in the records. According to modern historiographical studies that classify Chinese history by dynastic periods, the Tang dynasty is regarded as the era with the highest degree of historical manipulation and textual distortion among any other era. Another research conducted by Shiratori Kurakichi, Naka Michiyo, and Imanishi Ryu explores the fabrication of the Gojoseon downward migration myth, which follows the same route as the Sui-Tang Chinese immigration route.

== Reign ==
According to the Samguk sagi, Hyeokgeose and his queen traveled the realm in 41 BC, helping the people improve their harvests. The people praised them as the Two Saints or Two Holy Ones (이성; 二聖).

In 37 BC Hyeokgeose built Geumseong (금성; 金城) in the capital city (present-day Gyeongju), and in 32 BC he built a royal palace inside.

In 20 BC, the king of the Mahan confederacy demanded a tribute. Silla sent Hogong, who was a minister of Silla. The king was angry that Silla sent Hogong and not a tribute. Hogong criticized the king's impoliteness with fortitude. The king was angry at him and tried to kill him, but nearby subordinates stopped the king, and he was permitted to return to Silla.

In 19 BC, Hyeokgeose also sent an emissary upon the death of the Mahan king. In 5 BC, East Okjeo (a small state to the north, later conquered by Goguryeo) sent an emissary, and Hyeokgeose presented him with 20 horses.

According to the Samguk yusa, in the 61st year (4 CE), one day he went up to the sky, and eight days later, his body was scattered on the ground. And the queen also follows the king and dies. The people of the country tried to bury them, but a large snake appeared and disturbed them. Accordingly, the head and limbs were buried separately to create five tombs (五陵), and the name of the tomb was called Sareung. It is called Sareung (蛇陵) because snake (蛇) protect the tomb.

== Death and succession ==
Hyeokgeose ruled for around 60 years, and set the foundation for a kingdom that would unify much of the Korean Peninsula in 668.

Hyeokgeose maintained control over his kingdom and was one of the few Park rulers to hold complete power over Silla. He died at age 73, and was buried in Sareung, north of Dameomsa (south of Namcheon). Hyeokgeose was succeeded by his eldest son Namhae. In 6 CE, Namhae founded the Ancestral Shrine, which worshipped Hyokgeose, and Hyokgeose was deified as the Ancestor god of Silla. According to the Samguk yusa, Namhae had violently usurped Hyeokgeose' throne and killed him. Modern historians also believe that Hyeokgeose's successor Namhae may have actually been a Baekje priest who had been expelled from Baekje and had settled in Silla before becoming king.

== Legacy ==
Though not much is known about Hyeokgeose, his many legacies and reminders survive to this day. One of them being his numerous descendants, the Park clans of Korea, who are numbered as the third largest group of people with a common last name. All the Park clans in Korea trace their ancestry back to the first king of Silla, Bak Hyeokgeose. Another legacy was the kingdom that he established. The fact that he founded the Silla kingdom remained under high respects and great consideration by Gyeongju Gim (Kim) (김; 金) clan and Wolseong Seok (석; 昔) clan throughout Silla's history.

== Family ==
Princess Ahro, his daughter, is not included in the chart below. King Hyeokgeose also had a daughter named Ahro.

Unknown	사소부인; Saso
혁거세 거서간; Hyeokgeose	알영부인; Aryeong
남해 차차웅; Namhae

== In popular culture ==
- Portrayed by Jang Ho-seon in the 2003 film The Legend of Evil Lake

== See also ==
- Bongwan

== Notes ==
Hyeokgeose of Silla House of Park Born: 69 BC Died: 4
Regnal titles
New creation	Ruler of Silla; 57 BC – 4	Succeeded by Namhae
