= Samguk yusa =

13th century Korean historical record

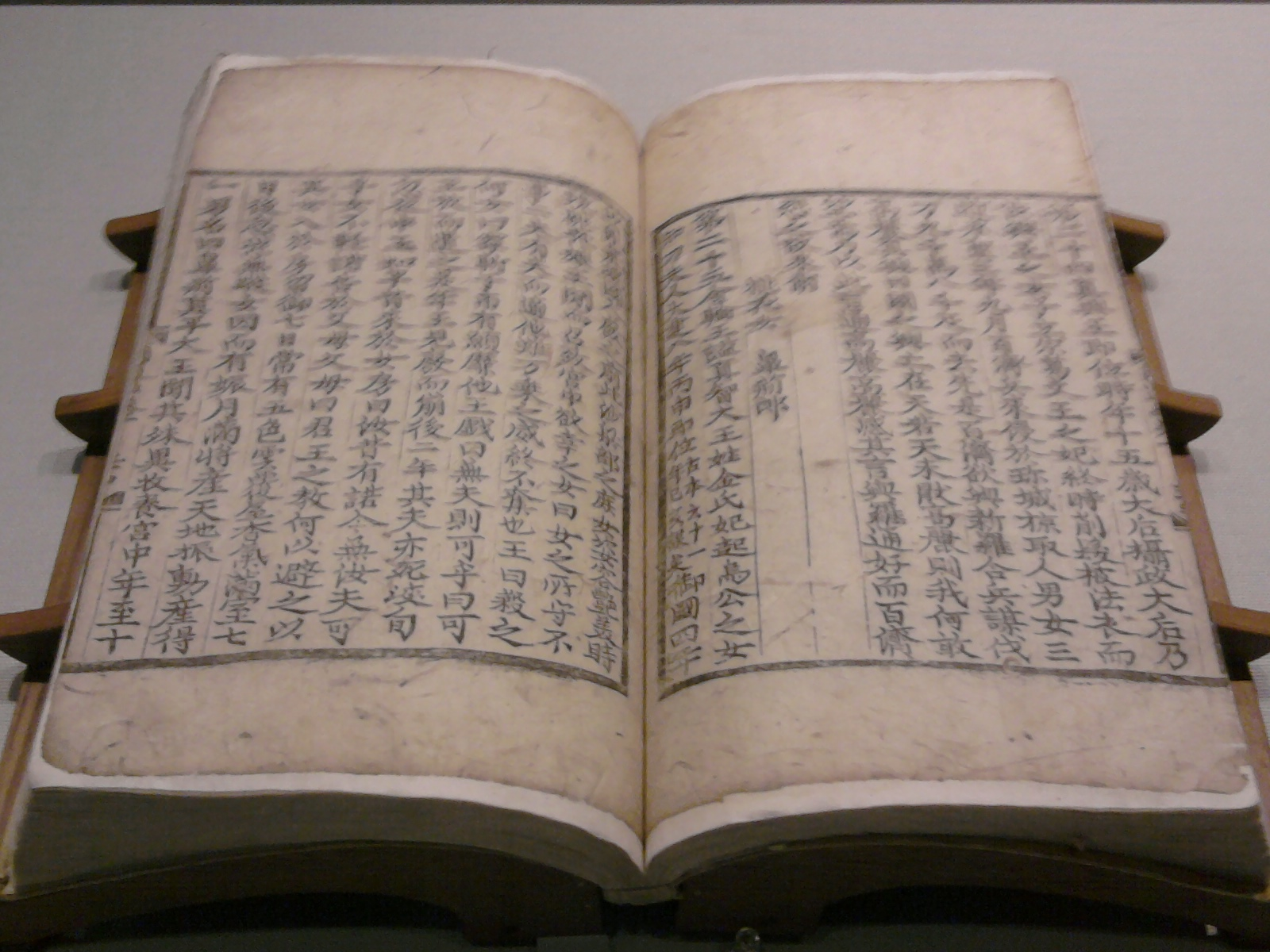

Korean name
- Hangul: 삼국유사
- Hanja: 三國遺事
- RR: Samguk yusa
- MR: Samguk yusa

Samguk yusa (Korean: 삼국유사; Hanja: 三國遺事; lit. 'Memorabilia of the Three Kingdoms') Korean pronunciation: [sʰam.ɡuk̚.ju.sa]) is a collection of legends, folktales, and historical accounts relating to the Three Kingdoms of Korea (Goguryeo, Baekje, and Silla), as well as to other periods and states before, during, and after the Three Kingdoms period. It was compiled by the Buddhist monk Il-yeon in the late Goryeo dynasty, around 1280, and was originally written in Classical Chinese. It is the earliest extant record of the Dangun legend, which records the founding of Gojoseon as the first Korean nation. Samguk yusa is National Treasure No. 306.

Samguk yusa is a history record composed of five volumes divided into nine parts. It documents various tales and legends which are categorized into two parts: historical events and Buddhist narratives. The text contains various historical narratives such as tales of the Three Kingdoms period, myths, legends, genealogies, histories, and Buddhist tales, which have helped maintain folklore from medieval Korea. "Yusa" is a term used to describe a text that is supplementary to an earlier work. Samguk yusa is intended to provide additional information to texts such as the Samguk sagi. The beginning of Samguk yusa describes Dangun Wanggeom, a mythological ancestor of all Koreans, founding the first nation of Korea, named Gojoseon. The text also contains several well-known tales such as "Choshin's Dream" and "Lady Suro".

== Background ==
Samguk yusa was written in the Ingak Temple in the 13th century. The author, Il-yeon, became a monk at the age of eight in 1214, working as an abbot in various temples, attending royal conferences at the king's command, and hosting important Buddhist events until his death in 1289.

The book was written during the Mongol conquest of Europe and East Asia, including China and Korea. Mongols invaded Korea for the first time in 1231. The invasion devastated the lives of Koreans by destroying valuable cultural properties, recordings, and literature. This invasion motivated Il-yeon to protect all of the folklore and stories handed down. Il-yeon collected and analyzed many works of Korean culture for a long period of time prior to the writing of Samguk yusa. The Korean peninsula was not yet united when the Samguk yusa was composed, so one of the Samguk yusa myths, Dangun, which is regarded as the root of all Koreans, has long been believed to have contributed to the idea of "one blood, one nation" among Koreans, as well as helping them to characterize themselves as a "common blood race".

However, there is also criticism that the sense of "one blood" could marginalize those who are not regarded as "genuinely Korean", as well as restrict the different ways that people could consider themselves Korean by eliminating diverse and possible viewpoints that are not rooted in this conservative mythology. In order to honor and pass down Il-yeon's achievements and life, the Inagak Temple holds annual festivals such as the Cultural Festival of Il-yeon Samguk yusa under the assistance of the Ministry of Culture and Tourism, and the festival activities include an academic seminar for academics, a writing contest for poems or essays, and poem recitation.

== Contents ==
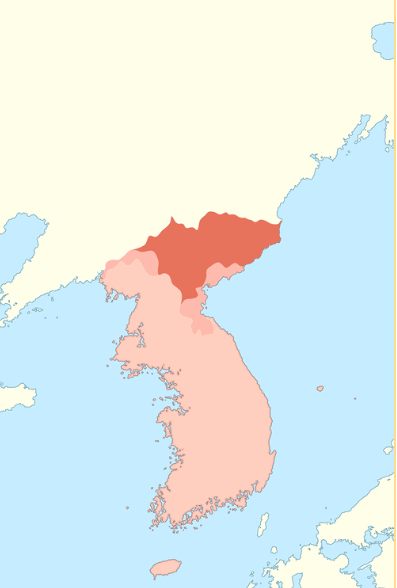
The Goryeo dynasty in the middle of the 14th century

Samguk yusa consists of two books containing a total of five volumes, divided into nine parts (fascicles): Wangryeok, Gii, Heungbeop, Tapsang, Uihae, Sinju, Gamtong, Pieun, and Hyoseon.

Wangnyeok is a brief chronology of the Three Kingdoms, Garakguk, Later Goguryeo, and Later Baekje. Gii contains the archive from Gojoseon to the late Three Kingdoms Period; it opens with an introductory passage explaining why it was written. Heungbeop is about the rise of Buddhism in the Three Kingdoms, and Tapsang includes pagodas and Buddhist images. Uihae contains narratives of famous monks during the Silla period. Sinju includes the tales about miracles that happened through esoteric Buddhism during the Silla dynasty. Gamtong is about stories of devotion. Pieun contains the legends of solitary heroes. Hyoseon contains folktales of filial piety and Buddhist virtues. Although it is divided into many parts, the composition of the entire book can be briefly described below:

Volume	Part	Theme
Volume 1	Part 1	Records of the Kings; Records of Great Wonders 1 (the founding of the kingdoms)
Volume 2	Part 2	Records of Great Wonders 2 (United Silla)
Volume 3	Part 3	Rise of Buddhism
Volume 3	Part 4	Pagodas and Buddhist images
Volume 4	Part 5	Anecdotes of renowned monks
Volume 5	Part 6	Tales of divination and miracles
Volume 5	Part 7	Emotional tales of devotion
Volume 5	Part 8	Seclusion
Volume 5	Part 9	Stories of filial piety

== Authorship and dating ==
The text was written in Classical Chinese, which was used by literate Koreans at the time of its composition. The earliest version of the text is believed to have been compiled in the 1280s, and the earliest extant publication of the text is from 1512.

20th-century Korean scholars such as Choe Nam-seon established the Buddhist monk Il-yeon (1206–1289) as the main compiler of the text, on the basis that his name (and full official title) was indicated in the fifth fascicle. This view is widely accepted among modern scholars. The compilation is believed to have been expanded by Il-yeon's disciple Muguk (1250–1322) and several others prior to the definitive 1512 recension.

Ha Chongnyong and Yi Kunjik produced a critical edition of Samguk yusa in 1997. According to Ha Chongnyong, Il-yeon wrote only the fifth fascicle, since his name is mentioned only in that section of the text.

The 1512 edition of the text mentions a dynastic chronology at the beginning, which has several discrepancies with the information that appears later in the text. According to Robert Buswell, Jr. and Donald S. Lopez, Jr., this chronology may have been a 14th-century addition to Il-yeon's compilation.

== National heritage ==
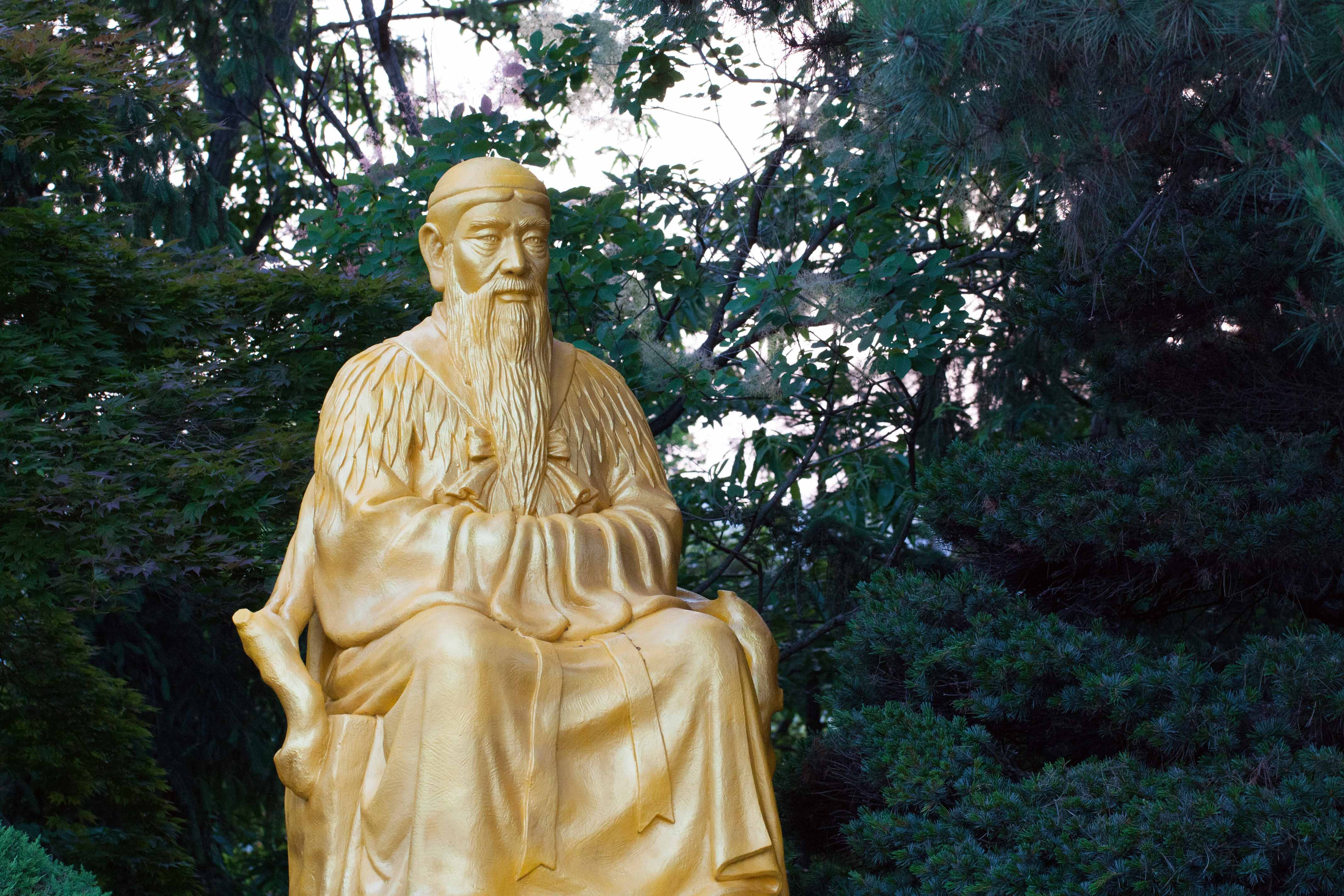
Gojoseon Tangun-Wanggeom Statue

Samguk yusa is considered an extremely important cultural heritage representing ancient Korean history and culture. It includes ancient literary works about history, Buddhism, and legends, most of which does not exist in modern times.

Moreover, the Samguk yusa is one of a limited number of sources for the study of ancient Korean language systems. In particular, its fourteen pieces of hyangga (ancient Korean folk songs) are especially important in the study of classical Korean literature. Additionally, Il-yeon uses different styles of writing, including ones from the Sinitic Buddhist Culture.

The book also includes plenty of information on Buddhist art, the dominant type of art in ancient Korean art history. In particular, Tapsang (part 4), "which mainly focuses on the founding of pagodas, Buddhist images and temples, is an essential source for the study of various remains and relics of both historical and archeological value." Lastly, the book includes various written records about young soldiers during the Silla dynasty.

== Comparison with Samguk sagi ==
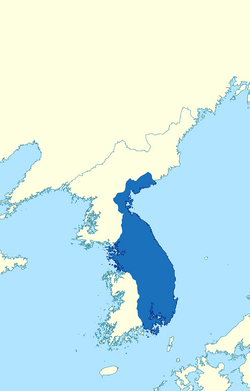
Map depicting Silla dynasty

Samguk sagi and Samguk yusa are often compared in terms of Korean history books, both holding a prominent place in Korean history. In terms of similarity, both of them were written by Goryeo scholars who believed they were descended from Silla rather than Goguryeo. This belief contributed to the emphasis of Silla history as the main focus of both the Samguk yusa and Samguk sagi. However, the two works differ in authorship: while the author of Samguk yusa was a devoted Buddhist monk, Samguk sagi was written by a Confucian scholar-statesman, Kim Pusik, allowing readers to access the two different historical works from the differing perspectives of Buddhist monk or Confucian official.

According to the Cultural Heritage Administration of Korea, "the book contains a wide range of records about young soldiers of the Silla Period, which are more religious and poetical than those written in Samguk sagi." On the other hand, studies have found that "Samguk sagi was almost immediately accepted as one of the most definitive histories of its time and within several decades was read even in China." Therefore, it can be considered that even though the Samguk yusa was written a century later, Il-yeon considerably relied on the Samguk sagi. Moreover, the Samguk yusa contains the historical elements not found in the Samguk sagi. Since it is also the same in reserve, it is found that the two works complement each other.

Kim Pusik attempted a more rational and logical approach towards the historical writings, whereas the romantic Buddhism approach of Samguk yusa of the Goryeo dynasty allowed the readers to experience the old historical cultures such as superstitions, folklore, and mythical stories. Both of the historical books are also generally focused on certain backgrounds in terms of religion. Despite the reasonable writing of the Samguk sagi, nationalist historians and scholars refer to it as a Chinese Confucian-centered book, arguing that it instils a subordinate attitude (sadae), with the ancient tradition ignored. In contrast, in the case of Samguk yusa, the majority of the text is dedicated to Buddhism, tailored to the Korean style under the author's influence; the only occurrence of Confucianism is in Hyoseon (part 9), which expresses filial piety as a way of Buddhism. Naturally, the contents of Samguk yusa were influenced more greatly by Il-yeon's Buddhist values than was the case for Samguk sagi. Il-yeon's work provides four bizarre stories depicting the discovery of archaeological artifacts to demonstrate the existence of Buddhism in the pre-modern era, the time of the tale's telling.

Buddhist stories, including both the principles of Buddhism and various Buddhist monks, account for nearly half (49.5%) of the total writing in Samguk yusa. In terms of adequate factual delivery, Samguk yusa conveys relatively insufficient historical information, such as about the explanation of kwallogup (officials' land) and sigup (the land for producing food), which are well described in Samguk sagi in detail. Nonetheless, the Samguk yusa and Samguk sagi are mutually regarded as complementary regarding uncompleted ancient recordings among Koreans today.

== Historical reliability ==
Many of the founding legends of the various kingdoms in Korean history are recorded in Samguk yusa. The text covers legends from many Korean kingdoms, including Gojoseon, Wiman Joseon, Buyeo, Goguryeo, Baekje, Silla, and Gaya. Unlike the more factually oriented Samguk sagi, the Samguk yusa focuses on various folktales, legends, and biographies from early Korean history. Given its mythical narratives, the reliability of Samguk yusa is questionable.

The author attempted to keep original phrases drawn from various sources—including Chinese Buddhist literature, Korean historical literature, and languages written in epigraphy—and he sometimes omitted unnecessary phrases or paraphrased several expressions with the intention of integrating them into the whole story. In terms of Il-yeon's research approach, he regarded the quality and quantity of the resources as crucial elements for his work, used the "inserted textual commentary" in order to seriously evaluate his resources, allowed readers to access comparative information about the history, and even expressed concerns about the reliability when there was insufficient information to depict. Moreover, Il-yeon attempted to use various versions of the same story when he recorded folktales and myths. For instance, he comments that the story of Tangun was quoted from both the Wei-shu ("Wei Dynasty History") and Tangun Kogi ("Ancient Record of Tangun"). This comment is valuable because both these source history books are not accessible now. The inscription of Samguk yusa is also a relatively credible source, but its contents are mainly confined to the mobilization of the peasantry for dike construction and the description of land property for the temple.

There is also skepticism surrounding Samguk yusa. It would not have been able to precisely interpret and explain the detailed picture of Silla, as it was written in the Goryeo period, roughly six centuries after the Three Kingdoms Period. Significantly, stories of the other nations of the three-kingdom period (Goguryeo and Baekje) are excluded. The overwhelming bulk are Silla stories, especially the stories that came from Korea's south-eastern region of "Kyngsang", known as Il-yeon's place of birth. With regard to religion, Confucianism—highly influential in both China and Korea—was marginally dealt with in the Buddhism-dominant Samguk yusa tales as a subjugated religion. For example, in the "Tale of the Monk Chinjong", Chinjong's filial reasons for not wanting to enter the monastic life are countered by his mother, suggesting that monastic life is regarded as even more filial behaviour than ignoring filial piety.

One bias of the Samguk yusa is that it chiefly relays stories of the upper class of Silla instead of the ordinary people. The aristocracy and members of the upper class constitute over half of the total number of narrative protagonists, with the figures correlated with Buddhist monks or nuns making up approximately twenty-five percent, and commoners only making up around eight percent of the contexts. Although historical interpretations of the content of the Samguk yusa are dependent on the resources Il-yeon chose to include, the book is nonetheless worthwhile in comprehending the overall landscape of Silla.

== Influences on Korean Buddhist tradition ==
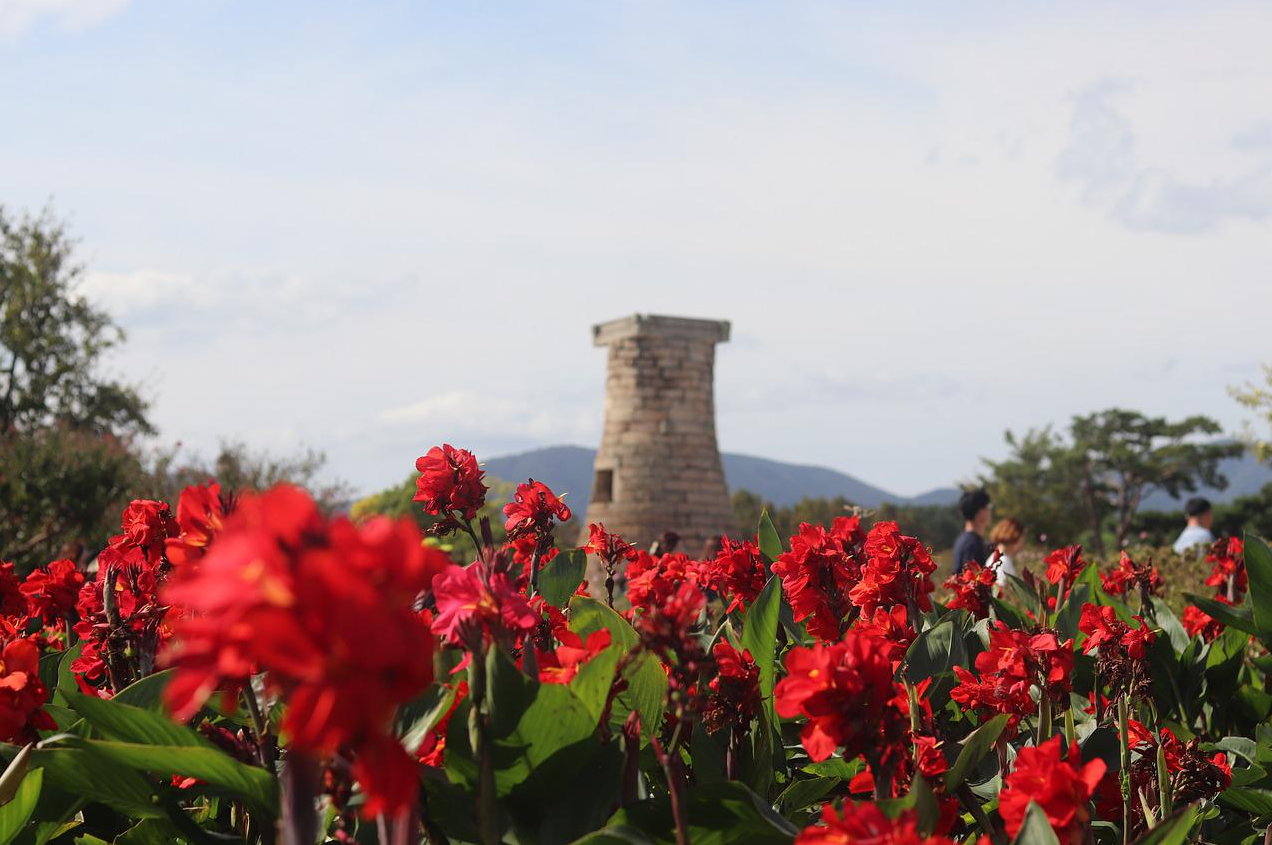
Chomseongdae Observatory in Gyeongju

The Three Kingdom Period is the age of the start of various institutions, teachings, religious practices, and cults. As the tales in Samguk yusa describes the birth of these traditions, these tales are both descriptive and prescriptive—they have been the source of the Korean Buddhist tradition up to the present day. The places mentioned in the book are also important religious points in modern-day South Korea. For instance, "the naming of mountains in Samguk yusa connects Korea with China and India and symbolically recreates the actual sacred places of Buddhism in Korea."

Many stories in Samguk yusa contain a common topos, wherein sacred remains of temples and statues are located or revealed at important locations. In Korean tradition, this hierophany almost exclusively takes place at or on mountains. As an example, tales describe Odaesan (五臺山) to be the home of a bodhisattva, in direct symbolic emulation of the Chinese Wutaishan Mountain (五臺山). The mountains were later changed into one large religious area encompassing multiple temples and shrines. In another story, "The Sixteen-foot Buddha Statue at Hwangnyongsa (皇龍寺丈六)", Korea is presented "as a country with the best karmic conditions in the world for building a large statue of the Buddha, even more suitable than India, the home of Buddhism." The king selects "a piece of high and clear ground" for the creation and enshrinement of the large statue, and it is successfully cast on the first attempt. Here, Korea is painted to be "the true home of Buddhism".

== Legends and tales ==
The text covers a wide range of subjects, including geography, literature, religion, art, and folklore, as well as ancient history. The stories naturally came from the lives of Goryeo people under the extreme suffering in the Mongol-dominant era in order to strengthen both a sense of national identity and descendance from a common ancestor. Among them, there are representative stories.

=== "Lady Suro" ===
When Soon Jeong-gong has lunch at Imhaejeong Pavilion while taking office as Gangneung Taesu during King Seongdeok's reign, Soon Jeong's wife, Lady Suro, sees that the royal azalea flowers are in full bloom. At her request, Soon Jeong picks a flower for her. After this, a dragon suddenly appears from the sea, dragging Lady Suro into the sea. An old man, walking along the street with a cow, appears and says, "If you gather the people and sing a song and hit the river hill with a cane, you will be able to meet your wife." Her husband follows the old man's advice, and the dragon returns his wife. This story portrays Lady Suro's unparalleled beauty that the water souls cannot ignore.

=== "Choshin's Dream" ===
Choshin, a monk who adores Kim Nang-Ja, enthusiastically begs Gwaneum Bodhisattva to realise love with her. However, one day, he hears that she has married, and Choshin falls asleep resenting the Avalokitesvara Bodhisattva. But when Kim Nang-ja comes in the night and asks to have a relationship, they joyfully go to his hometown and live together for more than 40 years. He has five children, but in his poverty, his 15-year-old child starves to death while they pass through Haehyeonryeong Pass in Myeongju, and he fails to hold a funeral. When Kim Nang-ja says, "Let's break up with each other rather than continue the miserable life as it is," Choshin agrees, and after sharing the children with each other, he awakens from his dream. After experiencing a miserable life of poverty and bareness in a dream, he realizes how vain human life is.

== Collections ==
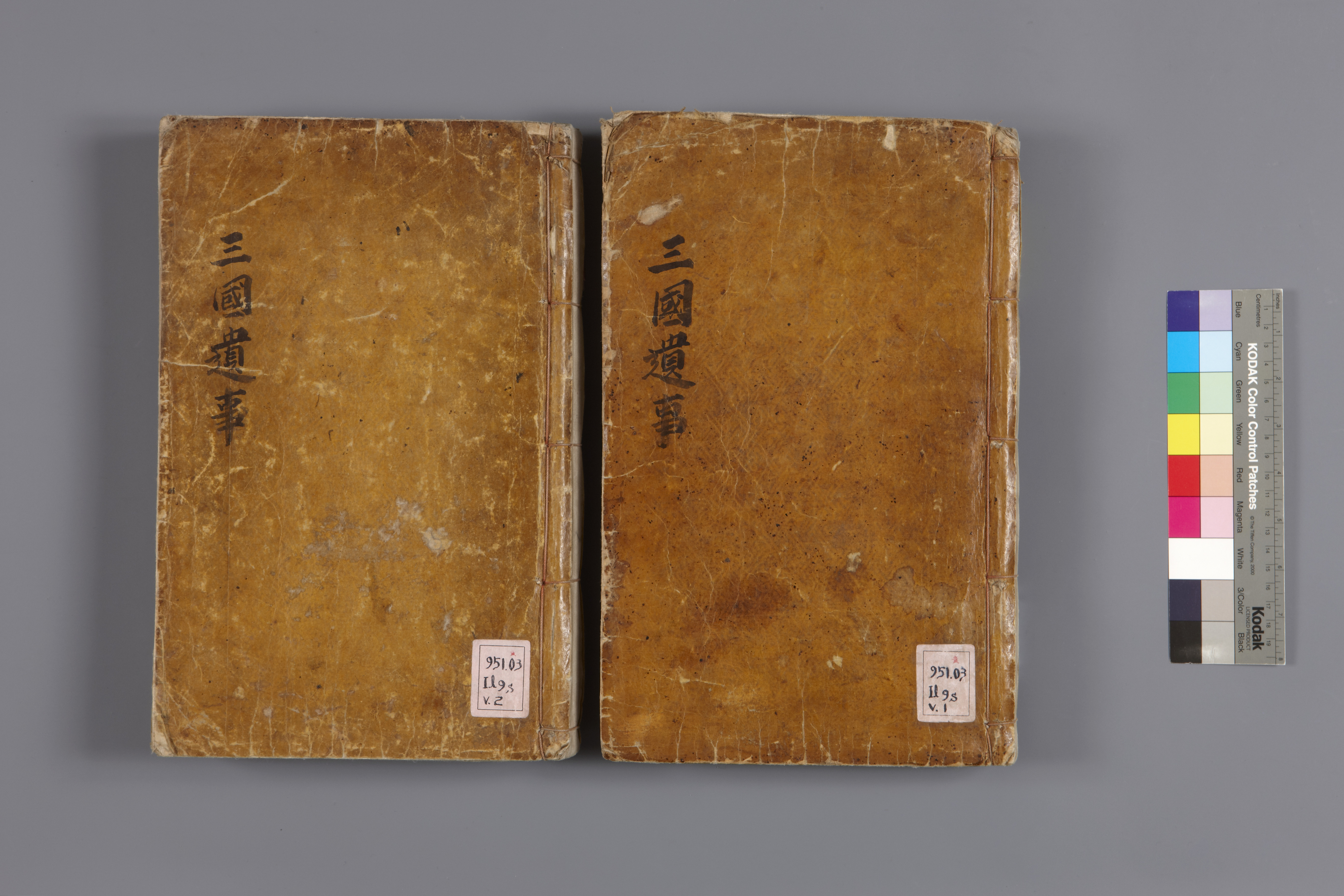
The Kyujanggak Collection of the Samguk yusa

=== Kyujanggak Collection ===
This copy of the Samguk yusa is owned by the Kyujanggak Institute for Korean Studies. This book is known as the earliest edition of Samguk yusa. It is the only complete book without missing pages, out of all the copies published in Gyeongju in 1512 (the 7th year of the reign of King Jungjong of the Joseon Dynasty), which is the earliest extant edition. This copy is most used by academic scholars in research.

=== Beomeosa Temple Collection ===
The Beomeosa Samguk yusa (one book composed of volumes 4 and 5), designated as National Treasure No. 306-4, is kept at Beomeosa Temple in Busan in the form of one book not including volumes 1 to 3. Two woodblock-printed editions of Sanguk yusa have been excavated in addition to this copy, and they have been designated as National Treasure Nos. 306 and 306-3. Even though this edition is an incomplete set, researchers regard it as highly valuable. It is the first printed copy of the Samguk yusa to have been engraved on wood in 1934. This edition is considered meaningful from both the historical and academic perspectives as it is a crucial copy for the restoration of the original woodblock-printed copy of the Samguk yusa, given that it is the only source which includes Chapters 28, 29, and 30 (missing from the other copies), along with the missing letters and errors in the copy published in 1512. Additionally, the collection at Beomeosa Temple is found to be closely related to the 1512 publication in terms of its font, size, and spacing between the lines, which shows its importance for bibliographical research was recognized even during the Joseon dynasty. Moreover, as it contains information on how to read the Chinese characters used in the text in Hangul (Korean alphabet), it is an applicable material for researchers of Korea’s ancient language. It was designated as the national treasure of the Republic of Korea on August 27, 2020.

=== Korea University Collection ===
This book contains volumes 3-5 of Samguk yusa. The first 10 pages of volume 3, and pages 18 to 31 of volume 5 (total of 23 pages) are missing. The cover of this book was restored, and the five-hole woven with a red thread was used for the title page. This book was kept by Choe Nam-seon, and was later donated to Korea University in Seoul.

This book originated from the edition published in Gyeongju in 1512. The Korea Heritage Service states that "The book belongs to the copy withdrawn relatively early among other extant copies of the Jeongdeok Edition of Samguk yusa, and has value as the bibliography of the Jeongdeok Edition (also known as the Imshin Edition of King Jungjong)." It is the only copy of the Jeongdeok Edition to include Korean endings on the Chinese characters.

=== Jung-gu Collection ===
The Jung-gu version of Samguk yusa is the only copy with volume 2 and no other volumes. In this copy, 4 sheets (17-20) out of 49 pages of the text were restored. The cover is restored in a manja pattern with a five-needle red thread, and the binding is in good condition.

On the front cover, "Hwangmajungyangwolmaedeuk Nisannamssigajang" is written with ink in the center. Moreover, the word "Nisanjang" on the middle of back cover indicates that it was purchased and kept by a person with surname Nam in February of the 55th year of the Chinese sexagenary cycle. In terms of structure, 24 out of 49 pages are generally longer than 1 cm in length compared to Jeongdeokbon edition. In terms of content, it can be seen that it was published in the early Joseon dynasty, as they were written in the style to avoid the names of Goryeo dynasty's kings. Moreover, it includes many differences compared to the 1512 Jeongdeok edition, and therefore acts as a reference to compare and correct the mistakes in the Jeongdeok edition.

=== Seodaemun-gu Collection ===
This copy of Samguk yusa, designated as National Treasure of Korea (No. 306-3) is an early Joseon edition. Along with a royal calendar, the brief chronology of Silla, Goguryeo, Baekje, Gaya, and Unified Silla, Later Goguryeo (including Goryeo), and Later Baekjae, it contains the records of mythical events (historical and cultural facts from the Gojoseon to the Late Three Kingdoms period). Even though only volumes 3 and 5 remain, this copy is valuable in that it is a complete edition without any missing pages as an early Joseon book. Importantly, it can supplement letters that are difficult to read among copies of the 1512 edition, and identify cited literary works of which there are no extant copies.

=== Jongno-gu Collection ===
This book is a collection of three volumes: 3, 4, and 5. The title, "Samguk yusa", is written in large letters and in small letters, and written as "Seokju" on the blue silk cover of the book. Every damaged and missing part of the copy was repaired and fully recovered to match the original contents. The volume consists of total 107 pages: 50 pages of the third chapter (missing first 6 pages), 31 pages of the fourth chapter, and 26 pages of the fifth chapter (missing last 4 pages). On the other hand, it is possible that most of the early Joseon books were not applied to the subjects of the Goryeo kings' names, such as Yong (the father of King Taejo) and Mu (the name of Hyejong), who were replaced by other characters in honor and samga. In terms of content, there are many differences in text compared to the 1512 Jeongdeokbon edition. Moreover, it is a valuable resource to correct errors in the edition in early Joseon period and it also works as a bibliography.

== Editions ==
- Ilyeon (2006) Overlooked Historical Records of the Three Korean Kingdoms, translated by Kim Dal-Yong. Jimoondang: Seoul, Korea. ISBN 89-88095-94-4
- Ilyon (1972; 2006) Samguk yusa: Legends and History of the Three Kingdoms of Ancient Korea, translated by Tae-Hung Ha and Grafton K. Mintz. Yonsei University Press: Seoul, Korea. ISBN 1-59654-348-5
- 일연 (1996) 삼국유사. Somun munhwasa: Seoul. ISBN 89-7004-002-1.
- 일연 (2002) 삼국유사. translated by Kim Won-jung. Eulyu munhwasa: Seoul. ISBN 89-324-6083-3.

== See also ==
- History of Korea
- Three Kingdoms of Korea
