= Bojong =

- Hangul: 보종
- Hanja: 寳宗
- RR: Bojong
- MR: Pojong

Gukseon Silla
- 1. Wihwa (魏花郞); 2. Mijinbu (未珍夫公); 3. Morang (毛郞); 4. Yihwa (二花郞); 5. Sadaham (斯多含); 6. Sejong (世宗); 7. Seolwon (薛花郞); 8. Munno (文努); 9. Bibo (秘宝郞); 10. Misaeng (美生郞); 11. Hajong (夏宗); 12. Bori (菩利公); 13. Yongchun (菩利公); 14. Horim (虎林公); 15. Yu-sin (庾信公); 16. Bojong (宝宗公); 17. Yeomjang (廉长公); 18. Chunchu (春秋公); 19. Yushun (钦纯公); 20. Yewon (礼元公); 21. Seonpum (善品公); 22. Yangdo (良图公); 23. Gungwan (军官公); 24. Cheongwang (天光公); 25. Chunjang (春长公); 26. Vacuum (眞功); 27. Heumdol (钦突); 28. Ohgi (吴起公); 29. Wonseon (元宣公); 30. Cheongwan (天官); 31. Heumeon (钦言); 32. Donor (信功)

Lord Bojong (Korean: 보종공; 580–621) was a member of Silla's royal family, Hwarang and also the 16th Pungwolju or Gukseon (國仙) from CE 616 to CE 621.

== Biography ==
Bojong was born in CE 580 at Seorabeol, capital city of Silla Kingdom in the reign of King Jinheung. Bojong was the only son of Lord Seolwon and Lady Mishil. He was talented in martial arts. Then he became Hwarang at 15 years old and served his mother, Lady Mishil. He became Gukseon, the Hwarang Leader, in CE 616 replacing Kim Yushin.

== Popular culture ==
- Portrayed by Baek Do-bin and Kwak Jung-wook in the 2009 MBC TV series Queen Seondeok.

== Family ==
Parents

- Father: Seolwon Rang (설원랑, 549–606
- Mother: Lady Mishil (미실; c. 546/548 – c. 612)

Consorts and issue

- Princess Yang-myeong, of the Kim clan ( 양명공주 김씨)
  - Princess Bora (보라궁주)
  - Princess Boryang (보량궁주; 604 – 670)
- Daughter of Munno (문노), the 8th Pungwolju

Preceded by Kim Yushin	Gukseon; 616-621	Succeeded by Yeomjang
