= Queen Sado =

Princess of Silla (died 614)

Queen Sado 사도왕후

Queen consort of Silla

Queen dowager of Silla

Grand Queen dowager of Silla
- Died: February 614; Silla
- Spouse: Jinheung of Silla
- House: Park
- Father: Park Yeong-sil
- Mother: Princess Okjin of the Gyeongju Kim clan
- Religion: Buddhism

- Queen Sado
- Hangul: 사도왕후
- Hanja: 思道王后
- RR: Sado wanghu
- MR: Sado wanghu

Dharma name
- Hangul: 묘법
- Hanja: 妙法
- RR: Myobeop
- MR: Myobŏp

Queen Sado of the Park clan (Korean: 사도왕후 박씨; Hanja: 思道王后 朴氏; ? – February 614) was a Queen Consort of Silla as the spouse of king King Jinheung of Silla, and the mother of his successor, King Jinji of Silla. According to the disputed text Hwarang Segi, she was regent during the minority of her grandson King Jinpyeong in 579-584, but her regency is not mentioned in the historical texts Samguk sagi or Samguk yusa. She later became a Buddhist nun under the name Myobeop (묘법; 妙法).

== Biography ==
=== Early life ===
She was born to Park Yeong-sil and Princess Okjin of the Gyeongju Kim clan. She became the consort of the king early. The Hwarangsegi chronicle claimed that she married the king as early as the age of seven. During the last years of her husband's reign, he entered the temple of Yeongheungsa, and she followed him there.

=== Queen mother ===
In 576 her spouse died, and was succeeded by their son. According to Hwarang Segi: It is said that he was dethroned by his mother, Queen Sado, for refusing to marry her niece (in some accounts, sister) Mishil. He made a promise to marry her and make her his Queen once he became a king but had a change of heart as soon as he took over the throne. He lost interest on her after falling deeply in love with another woman. They spread a rumor that heavens has forsaken Silla for having an immoral king, thus resulted for them losing their lands against the Baekje. They asked him to abdicate in order to appease the heaven. He was then sent to confinement and died 3 months later. His nephew who was only 10 years old at that time, was then announced as a new king but since he was still too young to rule, Queen Sado acted as his regent for years.

=== Regency ===
Her grandson was a minor, and she became regent during his minority. Since King Jinpyeong was only 13 years old when he ascended the throne in 579, Queen Dowager Sado, served as a regent until he reached the legal age in 584. However, Queen Sado still refused to give him full control of Silla even after he reached the legal age. She appointed Noribu, as the Sangdaedeung and Hujik as the head of the Military. Noribu died on December of 588, Sueulbu became the next Sangdaedeung after him. King Jinpyeong relied heavily on these two chief officials to solidify his kingdom in both internal affairs and international relations. He also gave the rank of Galmunwang to his brothers Baekban and Gukban, to solidify his power in the court.

== Family ==
- Father - Park Yeong-sil (박영실; 朴英失), Lord Gioh (기오공)
- Mother - Princess Okjin of the Gyeongju Kim clan (옥진궁주 김씨)
- Stepmother - Queen Dowager Jiso of the Gyeongju Kim clan (지소태후; ? – 574)
  - Step grandfather - King Beopheung of Silla (법흥왕; ? – July 540)
- Siblings
  - Older half-sister - Princess Hwanghwa (황화공주)
  - Older half-sister - Princess Songhwa (송화공주)
  - Older sister - Lady Myodo (묘도부인; 妙道夫人); Mi Jin-hu’s first wife
  - Younger sister - Lady Heungdo (흥도부인; 興道夫人)
- Husband - King Jinheung of Silla (진흥왕; 534 – 576)
- Children
  - Son - Crown Prince Dongryun (동륜태자; ? – 572)
    - Daughter-in-law - Lady Manho of the Gyeongju Kim clan (만호부인 김씨)
      - Grandson - King Jinpyeong of Silla (진평왕; 眞平王)
      - Grandson - Kim Baek-ban, King Galmun (김백반 갈문왕)
      - Grandson - Kim Guk-ban, King Galmun (김국반 갈문왕; 572 – ?)
    - Daughter-in-law - Lady Mi Shil (미실; 美室; 546/548 – 612)
  - Son - King Jinji of Silla (신라 진지왕; ? – 24 August 579)
  - Son - Kim Gu-Ryun (김구륜)
  - Daughter - Princess Taeyang (태양공주)
  - Daughter - Princess Ayang (아양공주)
  - Daughter - Princess Eunryun (은륜공주)
  - Daughter - Princess Wolryun (월륜공주)

== In popular culture ==
- Portrayed by Jeong Jae-Sun in the KBS TV series Dream of the Emperor
