= Misil =

Legendary Korean figure (fl. 6th–7th century)

- Born: c. 546/548
- Died: c. 612
- Spouses: Lord Sejong, 6th Pungwolju
- Issue: Lord Hajong (564–? CE); Lord Bojong (580–621 CE); Lord Okjong; Prince Sujong; Princess Banya; Princess Nanya; Princess Aesong; Princess Bohwa
- Father: Mijinbu
- Mother: Lady Myodo

Korean name
- Hangul: 미실
- Hanja: 美室
- RR: Misil
- MR: Misil

Misil (Korean: 미실; Hanja: 美室; c. 546/548 – c. 612) was a Silla aristocrat whose historical existence is debatable. According to the Hwarang Segi, she was a concubine to several kings and, along with her aunt Queen Sado, played an instrumental role in dethroning King Jinji. However, it has been questioned whether Misil was truly a historical figure, as she is only mentioned in the Hwarang Segi, and not in the historical texts Samguk sagi or Samguk yusa.

== Biography ==
According to the Hwarang Segi, Misil was the daughter of Lord Mijinbu and Lady Myodo, a sister of Queen Sado, the consort of Jinheung of Silla. Her paternal grandmother was Princess Samyeop, daughter of King Beopheung. Due to her lineage, Misil was a member of the jingol (진골; 眞骨), or the noble true bone caste. Matrilineally, she belonged to the Matrilineal clan of Daewon Shintong (대원신통; 大元神統) or directly translated as the divine succession of the great prime. The Daewon Shintong is believed to be descent from Bomi, however, the records in the reigns of Soji of Silla, that Bomi, the Lady Daewon (大元夫人), died and was buried at the age of 82. Lady Daewon has given birth to 12 children from several different fathers. Because of her nobility, her descendants were known as Daewon or great prime tribe. (大元族).

She was the wife of Lord Sejong (the sixth Pungwolju), the lover of General Seolwon (the seventh Pungwolju) and the older sister of Lord Misaeng (the tenth Pungwolju). She was concubine to three successive Silla kings: King Jinheung, King Jinji, and King Jinpyeong. Legend states that she was in love with Crown Prince Dongnyeon. Her sons became the 11th and 16th pungwoljus, Hajong (through Sejong) and Bojong (through Seolwon), respectively.

According to Hwarang Segi: Misil became King Jinji's concubine after his father, King Jinheung died. However, he lost interest on her after falling in love with another woman. His mother, Queen Sado, was angered about his sudden change of heart and failing to keep his promise on making her niece (Misil) into his Queen.

As a result, Queen Sado, with the help of Misil's lovers; Lord Sejong and General Seolwon, managed to get the support of the court to dethrone King Jinji. They gained people's support after blaming him for Silla's defeat which resulted to famines. They spread the rumor that heavens has forsaken Silla for having an immoral king. Jinji's removal resulted in the installation of his nephew, King Jinpyeong, to the throne. Jinji's grandson, Kim Chunchu, would later succeed the throne as King Muyeol.

== Historicity ==
It has been questioned whether Misil was truly a historical figure, as she is only mentioned in the Hwarang Segi, and not in the historical texts Samguk sagi or Samguk yusa. Additionally, her role as mother to her various sons and daughters is not acknowledged by either of these historical texts, only the Hwarang Segi.

== In popular culture ==
- Portrayed by Seo Kap-sook in 2006–2007 SBS TV series Yeon Gaesomun.
- Portrayed by Go Hyun-jung and Uee in the 2009 MBC TV series Queen Seondeok.

== Genealogy ==
=== Ancestors ===
Ancestors of Misil

8. Seonmo; (선모)
4. Lord Asi; (아시공; 阿時公)
18. Kim Seup-bo (습보; 習寶); Galmunwang (갈문왕; 葛文王)
9. Bohye; (보혜; 寶兮)
2. Lord Mijinbu (미진부공; 未珍夫公); 2nd Pungwolju (풍월주; 風月主)
20. Jijeung (지증왕; 智證王); 22nd King of Silla
10. Beopheung (법흥왕; 法興王); 23rd King of Silla
21. Lady Yeonje; (연제부인; 延帝夫人)
5. Princess Samyeop; (삼엽공주; 三葉公主)
22. Paro; (파로; 波路)
11. Lady Byeokhwa; (벽화부인; 碧花夫人)
23. Lady Byeoka; 碧我夫人 (벽아부인)
1. Misil; (미실; 美室)
12. Lord Suji; (수지공)
6. Park Yeongsil; (박영실; 朴英失)
26. Jijeung (지증왕; 智證王) (= #20); 22nd King of Silla
13. Princess Bohyeon; (보현공주; 普賢公主)
27. Lady Yeonje (= #21); (연제부인; 延帝夫人)
3. Lady Myodo; (묘도부인; 妙道夫人)
28. Lord Seongshin; (섬신공; 剡臣公)
14. Wihwa Rang (위화랑; 魏花郞); 1st Pungwolju (풍월주; 風月主)
29. Lady Byeoka (= #23); (벽아부인; 碧我夫人)
7. Lady Okjin; (옥진궁주; 玉珍宮主)
30. Myoshim Rang; (묘심랑; 妙心郞)
15. Lady Odo; (오도부인; 吾道夫人)
31. Lady Seonhye; (선혜부인; 善兮夫人)

=== Family ===
- For the lineage from Misil's parents upwards, refer to the ancestry chart above
- Younger Brother: Misaeng Rang (미생랑; 美生郞), 10th Pungwolju
- Husbands and lovers, and their respective issue:
1. Lord Sejong (세종공; 世宗公, ?–588), 6th Pungwolju (561-568, 572)
  1. Lord Hajong (하종공; 夏宗公, 564–?), 1st son, 11th Pungwolju (588–591)
  2. Lord Okjong (옥종공; 玉宗公), 2nd son by Lord Sejong
2. Lord Sadaham (사다함공; 斯多含公, 546–564), 5th Pungwolju (562-564) – No issue.
3. Seolwon Rang (설원랑; 薛原郞, 549–606), 7th Pungwolju (572–579)
  1. Lord Bojong (보종공; 寶宗公, 580–621), Only son, 16th Pungwolju (616–621)
4. King Jinheung (진흥왕; 眞興王), 24th King of Silla
  1. Prince Sujong (수종전군; 壽宗殿君), Only son
  2. Princess Banya (반야공주; 般若公主), 1st daughter
  3. Princess Nanya (난야공주; 蘭若公主), 2nd daughter
5. Crown Prince Dongryun (동륜태자; 銅輪太子, ?–572), son of King Jinheung
  1. Princess Aesong (애송공주; 艾松公主), Only daughter
6. King Jinji (진지왕; 眞智王), 25th King of Silla – No issue.
7. King Jinpyeong (진평왕; 眞平王), 26th King of Silla
  1. Princess Bohwa (보화공주; 寶華公主), Only daughter
