= Heungnyunsa =

Silla-era temple in Gyeongju, South Korea

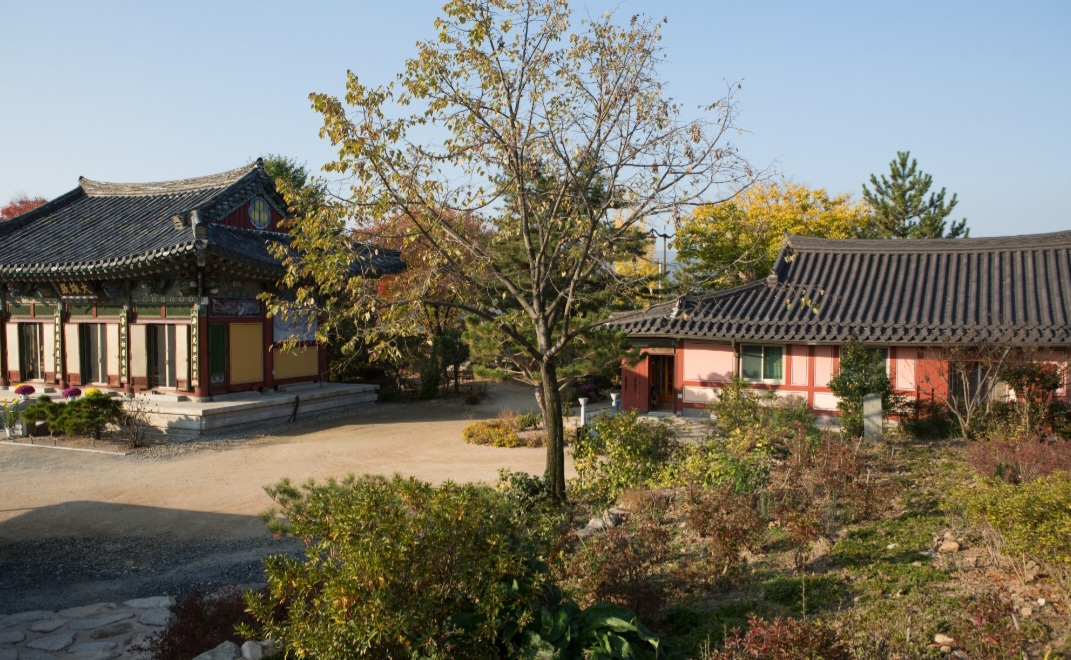
- Part of the recreated temple

Religion
- Affiliation: Korean Buddhism

Location
- Location: Gyeongju, South Korea
- Interactive map of Heungnyunsa
- Coordinates: 35.8283°N 129.2069°E (modern temple location)

Architecture
- Founder: Ado
- Completed: 527 (Korean calendar)
- Destroyed: Joseon period (1392–1897)
- Historic Sites of South Korea
- Official name: Heungnyunsa Temple Site, Gyeongju
- Designated: 1963-01-21
- Reference no.: 15

Heungnyunsa (Korean: 흥륜사; Hanja: 興輪寺) was an ancient Buddhist temple that was recreated in Gyeongju, South Korea. It was the first Buddhist temple of Silla. It was built in 527 (Korean calendar) and was destroyed and abandoned some time during the Joseon period (1392–1897). On January 21, 1963, it was designated Historic Site of South Korea No. 15.

Its location is disputed and not known with certainty. A modern temple with the same name was recreated in the 1980s on the area believed to belong to the temple. However, a roof tile later discovered in that area has led some scholars to argue that it actually hosted a different former temple Yŏngmyosa.

== Description ==
The temple was said to have been founded by Buddhist monk Ado, the first person to bring Buddhism to Silla. It was built in 527, upon the martyrdom of Ichadon. In 544, Buddhism was made the state religion, and King Jinheung gave the temple permission to operate. Jinheung later shaved his head and became the head monk of the temple. The temple is attested to in the Samguk yusa.

The temple continued to operate until it was destroyed by fire during the Joseon period. After which, it was abandoned for centuries.

The site believed to belong to Heungnyunsa was rediscovered in the 20th century. Its remaining relics were moved to the Gyeongju National Museum. One notable relic found in this area was the Roof-end Tile with Human Face Motif, which was purchased by a Japanese person from a Gyeongju antique shop in 1934. That tile too became stored in the Gyeongju National Museum in 1972.

The site believed to belong to the temple was excavated in 1972 and 1977. In the 1980s, a new temple with the same name was created at that site.
