= Hwarang =

Elite warrior group in Silla

- Hangul: 화랑
- Hanja: 花郞
- RR: hwarang
- MR: hwarang
- IPA: [hwaɾaŋ]

Hwarang (Korean: 화랑; Hanja: 花郞; lit. ''flowering youths'') were an elite warrior group of male youth in Silla, an ancient kingdom of the Korean Peninsula that originated from the mid 6th century and lasted until the early 10th century. There were educational institutions as well as social clubs where members gathered for all aspects of study, originally for arts and culture as well as religious teachings stemming mainly from Korean Buddhism. Chinese sources referred only to the physical beauty of the "Flower Youths". The history of the hwarang was not widely known until after the National Liberation Day of Korea in 1945, after which the hwarang became elevated to symbolic importance.

The Hwarang were also referred to as Hyangdo (향도; 香徒; lit. ''fragrant ones' or 'fragrant disciples''), the word hwarang and its colloquial derivatives being used for everything from playboy to shaman or husband of a female shaman. The word remained in common use until the 12th century but with more derogatory connotations.

== Traditional sources for Hwarang ==
Information on the Hwarang is mainly found in the historiographical works Samguk sagi (1145) and Samguk yusa (c. 1285), and the partially extant Haedong Goseungjeon (1215), a compilation of biographies of famous monks of the Three Kingdoms of Korea.

All three of these works cite primary sources no longer existent, including 1) a memorial stele to Nallang (presumably a Hwarang based upon the suffix nang) by the 9th–10th century Silla scholar Ch'oe Ch'i-wŏn; 2) an early Tang account of Silla titled the Xinluo guoji by the Tang official Ling Hucheng; and 3) Hwarang Segi, Chronicle of the Hwarang) by Kim Taemun, compiled in the early eighth century. In the late 1980s, an alleged Hwarang Segi manuscript was discovered in Gimhae, South Korea. Scholar Richard McBride regards it as a forgery.

== History ==
=== Wonhwa ===
According to the Samguk sagi and Samguk yusa, two groups of women called Wonhwa preceded the Hwarang. The precise nature and activities of the Wonhwa are also unclear, with some scholars positing they may have actually been court beauties or courtesans. However, considering that they were trained in ethics, this may be a later patriarchal reading into the Wonhwa. Women played a much more prominent social role in pre-Joseon Korea, especially in Silla, which had three reigning queens in its history.

Both sources record that during the reign of Jinheung of Silla, groups of beautiful girls were chosen and taught filial and fraternal piety, loyalty, and sincerity (no firm date is given for this, and some scholars express doubt this even occurred during Jinheung's reign). However, the leaders of the two bands of Wonhwa, Nammo (南毛) and Junjeong (俊貞), grew jealous of one another. When Junjeong murdered her rival, the Wonhwa were disbanded. No doubt the details of this origin story are most likely based on myth and legend, despite the facts surrounding the foundation of the sect being true, as supported by various documented sources. First note that the term wonhwa is composed of won 源, "source", and undoubtedly refers to the founders of the sect, while hwa 花, "flower", is a euphemism for someone who has spent a great deal of time or money in the pursuit of something, i.e. a devotee. In the case of the Wonhwa, devotion to philosophy and the arts. Furthermore, while the names nammo and junjeong could have been appellations adopted by these two ladies for use in court, one cannot overlook the obvious descriptions they portray. Nammo hints at one who is careless yet lucky, or perhaps someone who is innately insightful and therefore lackadaisical about further erudition. Junjeung clearly indicates a person who is talented and virtuous, despite the fact that she was the one who succumbed to homicidal tendencies. It would be logical to assume that if someone had to work hard, maybe even struggle with attaining certain goals, that envy might consume them if their counterpart, especially if viewed more as a rival, seemed to reach the same objectives with substantially less effort.

=== Origins of the Hwarang ===
It is conjectured that the foundation of the Hwarang system originated from the mid 6th century during the King Jinheung of Silla era, but the exact date of establishment is ambiguous: Samguk sagi reports the year of 576 AD, Tongguk t'onggam reports the year of 540 AD, and Sadaham is already recorded as a Hwarang in 562 AD according to Samguk sagi yeoljeon. Although some historians believe that the Hwarang played a big part in the unification of the Three Kingdoms, some historians are unclear about the role that the Hwarang played in the unification. According to the Samguk yusa, the Silla king, "concerned about the strengthening of the country ... again issued a decree and chose boys from good families who were of good morals and renamed them hwarang." The actual word used in this chronicle is hwanang (花娘), meaning "flower girls". This suggests that the Hwarang were not originally military in character, as the Wonhwa were not soldiers.

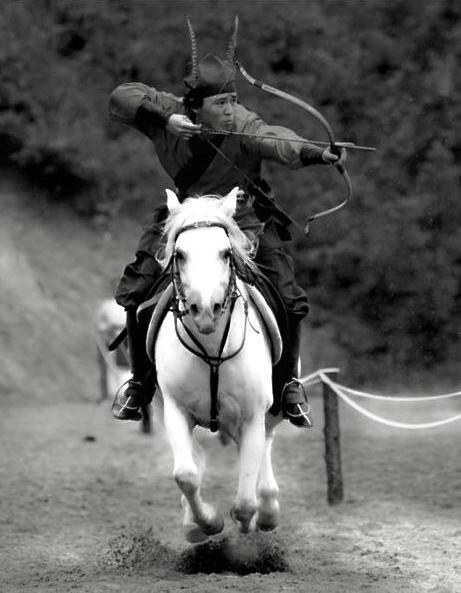
A modern-day Korean representing a Silla hwarang

The youths who were chosen by the Silla Kingdom became the knights and warriors for the Silla dynasty within the age of the Three Kingdoms of Korea. A close relationship did exist between the Hwarang and Buddhism because Buddhism was accepted as a state religion by the royalty and aristocrats within the Silla Kingdom. The Buddhist monks were often mentors for the Hwarang in both physical and spiritual ways. The Hwarang would seek the teachings of these Buddhist monks because they knew that the martial arts practiced by these Buddhist monks were a source through which they could strengthen themselves for greater success in the future and for the benefit of the Silla Kingdom. The monks would train themselves in physical fitness exercises through self-defense techniques, countering the weakening effects of long-term meditation and enabling them to protect themselves from bandits and robbers who tried to steal the donations and charities that were collected by the monks on their pilgrimages. Both the Buddhist monks and the Hwarang would go on journeys to famous mountains to heighten their training and would seek encounters with supernatural beings for protection and the success/prosperous of the Silla Kingdom. Won Gwang Beop Sa (圓光法士) was a Buddhist monk who was asked by the Hwarang to teach them ways to develop aspirations, bravery, and honor, in order to protect the Silla Kingdom from the other kingdoms inhabiting the peninsula. Won Gwang trained these youths in three areas:

1. Self-defense capabilities
2. Self-confidence
3. Self-control

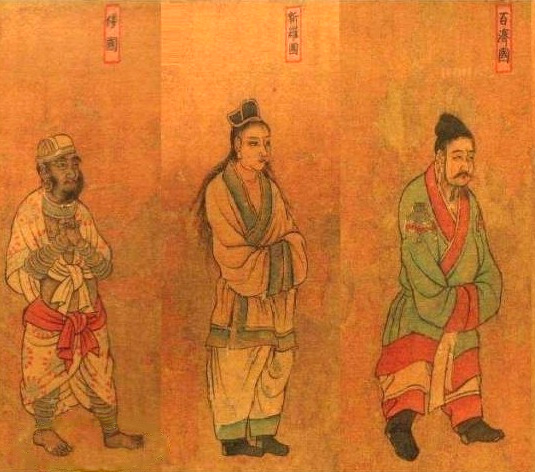
Tang'yŏm ippon wanghoe to (唐閻立本王會圖). 6th century, China. Envoys visiting the Tang Emperor. From left to right: Wa (Kumaso), Silla, Baekje ambassadors

Won Gwang taught the youths of the Hwarang to become warriors who could defend their beliefs with martial arts, to be confident in their actions, and to control themselves and their surroundings. Won Gwang gave to these Hwarang teachings in gwonbeop (martial methods or skills) that combined the secret Buddhist monk's physical and mental exercises. Won Gwang also proposed 5 principles or guidelines that were later called the Five Precepts for Secular Life (Se Sok O Gye; 세속오계; 世俗五戒) which became a list of ethics that the Hwarang could embrace (this is why he is commonly known as Beop Sa or "lawgiver"):

1. Show allegiance to one's sovereign. (sa·gun·i·chung; 사군이충; 事君以忠)
2. Treat one's parents with respect and devotion. (sa·chin·i·hyo; 사친이효; 事親以孝)
3. Exhibit trust and sincerity amongst friends. (gyo·u·i·sin; 교우이신; 交友以信)
4. Never retreat in battle. (im·jeon·mu·toe; 임전무퇴; 臨戰無退)
5. Exercise discretion when taking a life. (sal·saeng·yu·taek; 살생유택; 殺生有擇)

These commandments and teachings of Won Gwang were followed by the Hwarang to protect the Silla Kingdom from rival kingdoms and helped unify the nation of Ancient Korea until the fall of the Silla Kingdom.

In 520, King Beopheung had instituted Sino-Korean style reforms and formalized the golpum (bone rank) system. In 527, Silla formally adopted Buddhism as a state religion. The establishment of Hwarang took place in the context of tightening central state control, a complement to the golpum system and a symbol of harmony and compromise between the king and the aristocracy.

=== History ===
With the consolidation and expansion of Silla and intensification of military rivalries among the Three Kingdoms in the 6th century, the Silla court took a more active interest in the Hwarang. Hwarang groups were usually led by a youth of aristocratic standing, and the state appointed a high-ranking official to oversee the organization.

The Hwarang in the later 6th and 7th centuries trained in horsemanship, swordsmanship, archery, javelin and stone throwing, polo, and ladder-climbing. By the seventh century the organization had grown greatly in prestige and numbered several hundred bands.

The Samguk sagi, compiled by the general and official Kim Pusik, emphasizes the military exploits of certain Hwarang, while the Samguk yusa emphasizes the group's Buddhist activities. The biographies section of the Samguk sagi describes young Hwarang who distinguished themselves in the struggles against the Gaya confederacy and later Baekje and Goguryeo. According to the Hwarang Segi, as cited in the Samguk sagi and Haedong Goseungjeon, "...able ministers and loyal subjects are chosen from them, and good generals and brave soldiers are born therefrom."

The Hwarang were greatly influenced by Buddhist, Confucian, and shamanistic ideals. A Chinese official recorded, "They [Silla] choose fair sons from noble families and deck them out with cosmetics and fine clothes and call them Hwarang. The people all revere and serve them."Rutt, 17, citing the Samguk sagi quoting the no longer extant Xinluo guoji (Account of the Country of Silla) by the Tang official Linghu Cheng, who had visited Silla in the mid-8th century and later wrote an account of the country.

=== Disbandment ===
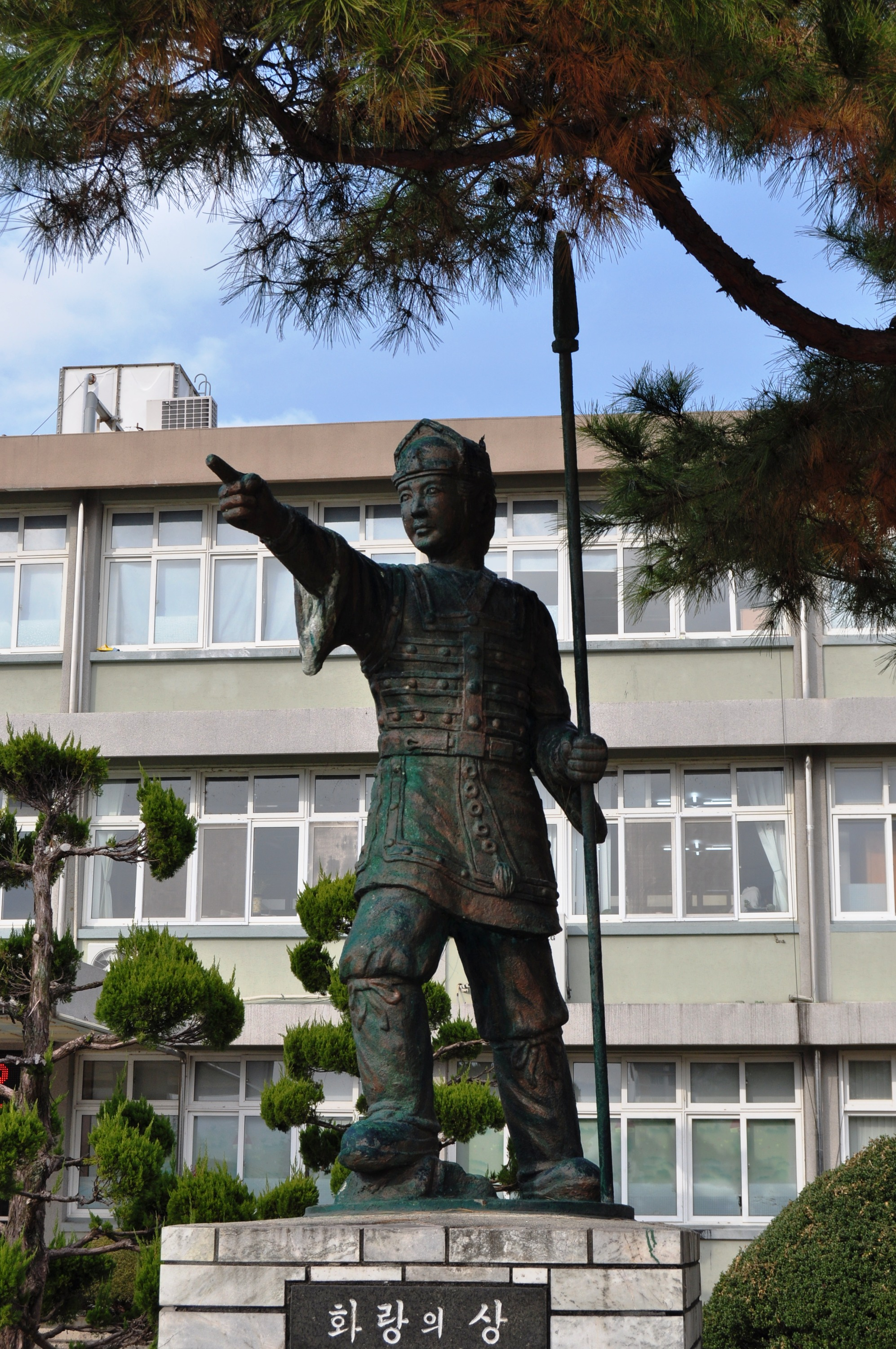
Statue of Hwarang (located in Hamyang Middle School)

After establishing a Unified Silla, the Silla-Tang War, and reestablishing relations with the Tang dynasty, the Hwarang lost much of their influence and prestige during peacetime. This group was reduced to a social club for Silla's elite through various names. They would eventually disappear after the fall of Silla, but they lasted through the Koryŏ dynasty until they officially disbanded at the beginning of the Joseon dynasty.

== Organization and training ==
There was never just one Hwarang group at a time. During King Jinpyeong’s reign, there were reportedly over seven such groups simultaneously, though it is not known whether each Hwarang group originally had a distinctive name. A central leader known as the Hwaju (花主) may have coordinated them. Each group was composed of one Hwarang, a few monks, and numerous nangdo followers — sometimes up to a thousand. The Hwarang, chosen from among aristocratic youths for their handsome appearance, virtue, and sociability, served as the charismatic leader. A Tang envoy, Gu Yin, visiting in 768, wrote in Records of the Kingdom of Silla (Xinluo Guoji): “Among the noble sons, those of beautiful appearance were chosen, powdered, and finely dressed, and called Hwarang. All people of the country revered them.” The monks within the group, like Wolmyeongsa, composed hymns and assisted in rituals, acting as spiritual and intellectual guides. The nangdo were likely drawn mainly from the six urban divisions of Gyeongju, including both noble and common backgrounds — possibly from the 1st to 6th dupum (bone-ranks), indicating a wide social range. The Hwarangdo was therefore not bound by hereditary or clan ties but was a voluntary association united by shared purpose.

Training typically lasted three years. Most members were between 15 and 18 years old. They traveled to sacred sites such as Mt. Namsan, Mt. Geumgang, and Mt. Jiri to cultivate patriotism and moral discipline, while also studying geography. Solitary meditation and ascetic experiences were common — Kim Yusin for instance fasted and prayed in mountain caves, seeking spiritual transformation. Such practices reflected shamanistic beliefs that divine will, especially that of mountain spirits, governed human and national destiny. The moral code of the Hwarang was later formalized as the Five Secular Precepts (Sesok ogye) by the Buddhist monk Won’gwang: loyalty, filial piety, trustworthiness, courage, and restraint in killing. Among these, loyalty and faithfulness were paramount — virtues needed during the century-long crises of unification.

Bonded by shared vows and rigorous training, Hwarang ties were intensely personal. Some, like Sadaham and Mugwanrang, even pledged death-companionship (sau, 死友). When Mugwanrang died, Sadaham grieved himself to death. Their loyalty to one another was so strong that they sometimes took justice into their own hands against anyone who wronged a fellow member.

=== Hwaju ===
The Hwaju (花主) is an official position that the state appointed to protect, guide, and nurture various Hwarang organizations. According to The Samguk Yusa (Volume 2, “Section on Wonders,” in the entry Jukjirang during the reign of King Hyoso), when Iksŏn (益宣), an official holding the rank of Agan (阿干), forced Deuko (得烏), a follower (Nangdo) of Jukjirang, to perform labor at Busan Fortress, the matter reached the royal court. The Hwaju, enraged by the misconduct, imposed a severe punishment on Iksŏn. This incident demonstrates the high authority and influence the Hwaju held within the state structure.

=== Pungwolju ===
The term Pungwolju (風月主) appears first in the Dongguk Tonggam (Comprehensive Mirror of the Eastern Kingdom). It is unclear whether Hwarang were actually called Pungwolju during the Silla period. The Samguk Yusa does mention Pungwoldo (風月道, “the Way of Wind and Moon”), which may have inspired the title. The “wind and moon” symbolized elegance and aesthetic cultivation—similar to “flower” in Hwarang—while Ju (主) again means “leader,” so Pungwolju might be interpreted as “Master of Wind and Moon.”

=== Gukseon ===
In the Silla period, a Gukseon (國仙) was a title given to a member of the Hwarang specially appointed by the king. Some scholars view “Hwarang” and “Gukseon” as synonymous, while others interpret Gukseon as the supreme leader among several Hwarang who each led their own groups of followers (Nangdo). Although the Samguk Sagi mentions only “Hwarang,” the Samguk Yusa uses the term “Hwarang Gukseon” and records their deeds. The institution was influenced by native Korean seon (spiritual or immortal) traditions, Buddhism (especially Maitreya belief), and Taoism. According to historical texts, King Jinheung first selected virtuous young men from noble families, adorned them, and named them Hwarang, with Seolwon-rang being the first appointed Gukseon. The Hwarang trained in ethics, music, and nature excursions, producing many loyal ministers and valiant generals such as Kim Yushin. Later kings, including King Gyeongmun, also served as Gukseon in their youth. Overall, the concept of Gukseon—blending indigenous Korean spirituality with Taoist elements—played an important role in shaping Silla’s political, moral, and religious culture and remains a key subject in the study of ancient Korean history and religion.

=== Nangdo ===
Nangdo (郎徒) also known as Hyangdo are likely referred to the followers of the Hwarang originating from the aristocracy and commoners. In the Samguk Sagi, Yonghwa Hyangdo was the name of the group of nangdo led by Kim Yusin (金庾信), who was a Hwarang during the reign of King Jinpyeong. This designation suggests that the Hwarang institution was closely connected with Buddhist Maitreya (Mireuk) belief.

The term “Yonghwa” (Dragon Flower) derives from the belief that Maitreya, the future Buddha, will descend into the human world in a later age and, beneath the Yonghwa Tree (Dragon Flower Tree), preach the Dharma three times to those who have karmic connections with him. The term “Hyangdo” refers to a Buddhist devotional association. Thus, Yonghwa Hyangdo can be understood as “a group that follows Maitreya,” implying that Kim Yusin, the Hwarang leader, was regarded as Maitreya incarnate descending from Tusita Heaven (兜率天). The idea that a Hwarang was an incarnation of Maitreya can be inferred from sources such as the Mireuk Seonhwa (Maitreya Immortal Flower) legend from the reign of King Jinji, as well as the birth legend of Jukjirang (竹旨郎), in which Maitreya also appears. Many passages use expressions like Hwarang nangdo (花郞郎徒), suggesting that all these titles were interrelated and associated with the Hwarang system.

== Five commandments ==
Two youths, Gwisan (귀산,貴山) and Chwihang (취항; 取項), approached the Silla monk Won Gwang seeking spiritual guidance and teaching, saying, "We are ignorant and without knowledge. Please give us a maxim which will serve to instruct us for the rest of our lives."

Won Gwang, who had gained fame for his period of study in Sui China, replied by composing the Sesok-ogye ("Five Commandments for Secular Life"; 세속 오계; 世俗五戒). These have since been attributed as a guiding ethos for the Hwarang:

1. Loyalty to one's lord (sagun ichung; 사군이충; 事君以忠; 나라에 충성하고)
2. Love and respect your parents (sachin ihyo; 사친이효; 事親以孝; 부모님께 효도하고)
3. Trust among friends (gyo-u isin; 교우이신; 交友以信; 믿음으로 벗을 사귀고)
4. Never retreat in battle (imjeon mutwae; 임전무퇴; 臨戰無退; 싸움에 나가서는 물러서지 않으며)
5. Never take a life without a just cause (salsaeng yutaek; 살생유택; 殺生有擇; 살아있는 것을 함부로 죽이지 않는다)

The Samguk yusa also records that Hwarang members learned the Five Cardinal Confucian Virtues, the Six Arts, the Three Scholarly Occupations, and the Six Ways of Government Service (五常六藝 三師六正).

== Different perspectives on Hwarang ==
Hwarang is described by the Russian-Korean historian Vladimir Tikhonov (Pak Noja), as "sweet young men." Tikhonov indicated that, from the standards of Silla Kingdom, they were considered soft and affectionate people, but the reason why Hwarang were associated with the military and were referred to as warriors and knights is because the heavily militarized Korean societies of the Three Kingdoms Period had strict military laws and traditions that rewarded bravery and punished cowardice, and with the rest of the society, Hwarang too were required to become warriors and serve in the military.

== Famous Hwarang ==
- Kim Yu-sin
- Kim Alcheon
- Kim Won-sul
- Kim Gwanchang (김관창)

== Other uses ==
Ribbon of the present day Hwarang Medal (South Korean Order of Military Merit, Fourth Class)

Following the fall of Silla, the term hwarang survived and changed in meaning again. In Ch'oe Sejin's 1527 book Hunmong chahoe (훈몽자회), the term hwarang is referred to as a male prostitute. Today, Hwarang is often used in the names of various schools, organizations and companies.

- The Taekwon-Do pattern Hwa-Rang as well as several traditional forms are named in honor of the Hwarang.
- A South Korean cigarette brand issued to the armed forces was called "Hwarang".
- Hwa Rang Do is a modern Korean martial art that is inspired by the ancient Hwarang warriors and their legacy.
- In the fighting game series Tekken, a playable character named Hwoarang is present in the game, and fights with the Taekwondo style.
- Grandmaster Ho Sik Pak named his martial arts federation the "Hwa Rang World Tang Soo Do Federation" in honor of the Hwarang.
- Silla"新羅 花郎徒" 興武大王·將軍 金庾信 Kim Yu-sin 後孫 a scion of a royal stock kim chul 實戰戰鬪護身術 創始者"Hosinsool.

== In popular culture ==
- Hwarang: The Poet Warrior Youth (KBS2, 2016–2017)
- Queen Seondeok (MBC, 2009)

== See also ==
- History of Korea
- Wonhwa
- Namsadang
- Knight
- Samurai
- Shinsengumi
- Shi (class)
- Kheshig
