= Dongryun =

Korean royalty

- Hangul: 동륜태자
- Hanja: 銅輪太子
- RR: Dongnyun taeja
- MR: Tongnyun t'aeja

Crown Prince Dongryun (Korean: 동륜태자; ? – 572) was the eldest son of Jinheung of Silla and Queen Sado. He is the father of Jinpyeong of Silla.

In 566, he was appointed as the Crown Prince, but died in 572, before he could to ascend the throne. His younger brother, Saryun (사륜) became King Jinji. After Jinji's abdication, Dongryun's eldest son became King Jinpyeong of Silla.

According to Hwarang Segi, he secretly fell in love with Lady Misil, his father's concubine.

== Family ==
Parents

- Father Jinheung of Silla
  - Grandfather: Galmunwang Ipjong (입종 갈문왕)
  - Grandmother: Queen Jiso (지소태후; ? – 574)
- Mother: Queen Sado of the Park clan (사도왕후 박씨; ? – February 614)
  - Grandfather: Pak Yŏngsil (박영실; 朴英失), Lord Gi-oh (기오공)
  - Grandmother: Princess Okjin of the Gyeongju Kim clan (옥진궁주 김씨)
- Consorts and issues:
  - Queen Manho, of the Kim clan (만호부인 김씨; d.579), daughter of Galmunwang Ipjong
    - Kim Paekjŏng, Jinpyeong of Silla (567 – 632)
    - Kim Paekban (김백반), Galmunwang Jinjeong (진정 갈문왕)
    - Kim Kukban (김국반), Galmunwang Jin-an (진안 갈문왕)
  - Lady Misil (미실)
    - Princess Aesong (艾松公主, 애송공주)
  - Queen Yungun, of the Kim clan (윤궁부인 김씨), daughter of the 8th Pungwolju
    - Princess Yunsil (윤실공주)
