= Hwarang: The Poet Warrior Youth =

2016–2017 South Korean television series

- Promotional poster
- Also known as: Hwarang: The Beginning
- Genre: Historical; Coming-of-age; Romance
- Created by: Han Suk-won; Park Seong-hye
- Developed by: KBS Drama
- Written by: Park Eun-yeong
- Directed by: Yoon Sung-sik; Kim Yeong-jo
- Starring: Park Seo-joon; Go Ara; Park Hyung-sik
- Theme music composer: Oh Joon-sung
- Opening theme: "Hwarang Spirit"
- Composer: Oh Joon-sung
- Country of origin: South Korea
- Original language: Korean
- No. of episodes: 20 + 4 specials

Production
- Executive producer: Jung Hae-ryong
- Producers: Kim Sang-hee; Kim Hyung-suk; Lee Yeong-bum
- Cinematography: Jang Byung-wook; Choi Ki-ha
- Editors: Kim Tae-yeong; Song Eun-jung
- Running time: 58 minutes
- Production companies: Hwarang SPC; Oh!Boy Project

Original release
- Network: KBS2
- Release: December 19, 2016 – February 21, 2017

Hwarang: The Poet Warrior Youth (Korean: 화랑; Hanja: 花郞; lit. 'Hwarang') is a 2016 South Korean television series starring Park Seo-joon, Go Ara and Park Hyung-sik. It revolves around an elite group of young men called Hwarang, who discover their passion, friendship and love in the turmoil of the Silla Kingdom (57 BC–AD 935). The series aired every Monday and Tuesday at 22:00 (KST) on KBS2, from December 19, 2016 to February 21, 2017.

At the 31st KBS Drama Awards, Choi Won-young won the "Best Supporting Actor" and Park Seo-joon received a nomination for the "Top Excellence Award".

== Synopsis ==
Queen Jiso (Kim Ji-soo) as regent, has been the ruler of Silla since the death of her father, King Beopheung, while keeping her son, Sammaekjong (Park Hyung-sik), hidden from enemies and assassins. As the young King comes of age, citizens, officials and Sammaekjong himself, have all grown impatient for her to cede power. However, the powerful nobles that tried to usurp the power continue to eye the throne, and Jiso fears the consequences of her ceding it. In order to break the power of the nobles, who have grown accustomed to their privileges under the bone rank system, Jiso plans to create a new elite group, the Hwarang, that will cut across the existing power factions, and to bind them to protect her son and the throne. As this new elite group of male youths bond and grow, they are unaware that within their number is their King, Sammaekjong, and Kim Sun-woo (Park Seo-joon), a commoner with a secret even he is not aware of.

== Cast and characters ==
=== Main ===
- Park Seo-joon as Moo-myung / Kim Sun-woo / Dog-bird

A young man of low birth, who rises above his situation in life and becomes a legendary Hwarang warrior. He assumes the identity of his friend, Kim Sun-woo, after he is killed by one of the Queen Regent's men.

- Go Ara as Kim Ah-ro

A "half-breed" (derogative term for an offspring born to a Jingol father and a low-class mother), with a cheerful and straightforward personality. She works multiple jobs to support her family.

- Park Hyung-sik as Sammaekjong / Kim Ji-dwi / Jinheung of Silla

The young and distrustful King, who goes into hiding due to assassination attempts. He joins the Hwarang under the name of "Kim Ji-dwi", Lord Kim Wi-hwa's nephew.

=== Supporting ===
==== Hwarangs ====
- Sung Dong-il as Lord Kim Wi-hwa

The 1st Pungwolju of the Hwarang, who acts as a fatherly figure towards the boys. Secret adviser of Ji-dwi.

- Do Ji-han as Park Ban-ryu

Having been taught politics (by his two fathers – Park Young-shil and Park Ho, as his adoptive and biological fathers, respectively) from an early age, he is a cold-blooded Seonggol, who is competitive and seeks for more power.

- Choi Min-ho as Kim Soo-ho

A Seonggol aristocrat born with a silver spoon in his mouth. Hot-blooded and chivalrous, he aces in swordplay and is seen as a shameless playboy but is devoted in love. Kim Soo-yeon's overprotective older brother.

- Kim Tae-hyung as Seok Han-sung

The youngest Hwarang, who has a warm personality and gets along with everyone. He is a bright and innocent boy who carries a heavy burden as the last Seonggol of his clan. Dan-se's younger half-brother.

- Cho Yoon-woo as Kim Yeo-wool

A man who "has a mysterious charm and loves dressing up more than most women", he is thoughtful and caring, but possesses a sharp tongue. His mother is the previous King's sister, while his Jingol father's identity still remains a mystery.

- Kim Hyun-joon as Seok Dan-se

22 years old, part of Soo-ho's clique. He is Han-sung's elder half-brother, who is powerless due to his "half-breed" status and is always looked down by their grandfather. Assigned as Sun-woo's trainee.

- Yoo Jae-myung as Pa-oh

Sammaekjong's personal bodyguard, who cares for him like a father, as well as Ji-dwi's assigned trainee.

- Jang Se-hyun as Kang Sung

Part of Ban-ryu's clique. Originally one of the Hwarang rejects, he is later scouted by Park Young-shil in order to undermine the Hwarang. Assigned as Ban-ryu's trainee.

- Jin Ju-hyung as Jang Hyun

Part of Soo-ho's clique.

- Jun Bum-soo as Kim Shin

Part of Ban-ryu's clique.

- Jung Young-hoon as Kim Ki-bo

Part of Ban-ryu's clique.

- Park Ki-hoon as Joo Ki

==== Royal Family ====
- Kim Ji-soo as Queen Jiso

Silla's acting Queen Regent, who has hidden her son, Sammaekjong, ever since the death of her father, the previous King, 11 years ago. She is the founder of the Hwarang and has many dark secrets.

- Seo Yea-ji as Princess Suk-myung

Sammaekjong's maternal half-sister, as well as future consort.

- Song Young-kyu as Lord Kim Hwi-kyung

Queen Jiso's elder brother and originally the Crown Prince of Silla, his name was removed from the Royal Family's records due to polio. Sun-woo (Moo-myung)'s biological father.

==== Royal Capital citizens ====
- Choi Won-young as Lord Kim Ahn-ji

A Jingol who was driven to poverty and was separated from his only son, Sun-woo, 12 years prior. Works as a physician aided by his daughter Ah-ro.

- Kim Kwang-kyu as Pi Joo-ki

Owner of the store Dayiseo, as well as its subsidiary tea-house, Sutabaksu.

- Lee Da-in as Kim Soo-yeon

Younger sister of Soo-ho and Ah-ro's only friend.

==== Makmangchon people ====
- Lee Kwang-soo as Mak-moon / Kim Sun-woo (Ep. 1–3)

Moo-myung's friend. Originally named "Sun-woo", he was separated from his family for 12 years by Queen Jiso's men, and ended up at Makmangchon. Killed because he saw the King's face.

- Kim Won-hae as Woo Reuk (Ep. 1–3, 6, 8–10, 15)

Refugee from the conquered Daegaya. Renowned musician and inventor as well as master of the gayageum, he becomes the music and dance teacher of the Hwarang. Mak-moon & Moo-myung's foster father in Makmangchon, who (along with Kim Hwi-kyung) holds the secret to Moo-myung's true identity.

==== Ministers of Silla ====
- Kim Chang-wan as Park Young-shil

Ban-ryu's adoptive father. A cruel and cunning leader of the opposition, who yearns for more power, and would do anything to overthrow and kill the King.

- Lee Byung-joon as Park Ho

Ban-ryu's biological father. Member of the opposition due to indebtedness to Park Young-shil.

- Ko In-bum as Kim Seup

Soo-ho and Soo-yeon's father. Main supporter of the Royal Family.

- Kim Jong-goo as Seok Hyun-jae

Han-sung and Dan-se's grandfather. Member of the opposition.

=== Extended ===
- Kang Dong-woo as Mu-cheol
- Song Min-hyung as Kim Hyung-won
- Baek Jae-jin as Yang Jo-jang
- Ban Min-jung as Mi Roo-hyang
- Lee Kwan-hoon as A-chu
- Lee Kyu-hyung as Do-go
- Lee Min-ho as So-gam
- Park Ha-yan as Yoo-ji
- Oh Eun-ho as Mo-yeong

=== Special appearance ===
- Kim Min-jun as Crown Prince Chang (later Wideok of Baekje) (Ep. 14–15)

== Production ==
=== Development ===
The series reunited Sung Dong-il and Go A-ra, who previously worked together in tvN's Reply 1994 (2013), as well as Sung and Yoo Jae-myung, who both starred in the hit series Reply 1988 (2016). It also serves as a reunion to Park Hyung-sik and Choi Won-young, who worked together in SBS's hit drama, The Heirs (2013). It also reunited Park and Kim Won-hae, who worked together in Nine: Nine Time Travels (2013).

=== Filming ===
The first script reading took place in March 2016. Filming began on March 31, and finished on September 1, 2016.

== Original soundtrack ==
Hwarang: The Poet Warrior Youth Original Soundtrack

Soundtrack album by Various artists
- Released: 2017
- Genres: K-Pop; Soundtrack
- Languages: Korean; English
- Labels: Oh!Boy Project; Sony Music
- Producer: Park Sung-hye (executive)

=== Part 1 ===
No.	Title	Lyrics	Music	Artist	Length
1.	"Wherever You Are" (그 곳이 어디든)	Kim Jin-ah	Oh Joon-sung	Han Dong-geun	04:48
2.	"Wherever You Are" (Inst.)		Oh Joon-sung		04:48
Total length:					09:36

=== Part 2 ===
No.	Title	Lyrics	Music	Artist	Length
1.	"It's Definitely You" (죽어도 너야)	Kim Yoo-kyung	Oh Joon-sung	V, Jin (BTS)	03:50
2.	"It's Definitely You" (Inst.)		Oh Joon-sung		03:50
Total length:					07:40

=== Part 3 ===
No.	Title	Lyrics	Music	Artist	Length
1.	"Dream" (드림)	June	Oh Joon-sung	Bolbbalgan4	04:26
2.	"Dream" (Inst.)		Oh Joon-sung		04:26
Total length:					08:52

=== Part 4 ===
No.	Title	Lyrics	Music	Artists	Length
1.	"Only You" (너만보여)	June	Oh Joon-sung	Seulgi, Wendy (Red Velvet)	03:19
2.	"Only You" (Inst.)		Oh Joon-sung		03:19
Total length:					06:38

=== Part 5 ===
No.	Title	Lyrics	Music	Artist	Length
1.	"Our Tears" (서로의 눈물이 되어)	Kim Yoo-kyung	Oh Joon-sung	Hyolyn (Sistar)	04:23
2.	"Our Tears" (Inst.)		Oh Joon-sung		04:23
Total length:					08:46

=== Part 6 ===
No.	Title	Lyrics	Music	Artist	Length
1.	"The Divine Move" (신의 한 수)	Kim Yoo-kyung	Oh Joon-sung	Yoseob (Highlight)	04:08
2.	"The Divine Move" (Acoustic Ver.)	Kim Yoo-kyung	Oh Joon-sung	Kim Juna	03:55
3.	"The Divine Move" (Inst.)		Oh Joon-sung		04:08
4.	"The Divine Move (Acoustic Ver.)" (Inst.)		Oh Joon-sung		03:55
Total length:					18:12

=== Part 7 ===
No.	Title	Lyrics	Music	Artist	Length
1.	"I'll Be Here" (여기 있을게)	Kim Yoo-kyung	Oh Joon-sung	Park Hyung-sik	04:18
2.	"I'll Be Here" (Inst.)		Oh Joon-sung		04:18
Total length:					08:36

=== Part 8 ===
No.	Title	Lyrics	Music	Artist	Length
1.	"Memories of Miracle" (주문을 외우다)	Kim Yoo-kyung	Oh Joon-sung	Jeon Woo-sung (Noel)	04:00
2.	"Memories of Miracle" (Inst.)		Oh Joon-sung		04:00
3.	"Hwarang The Beginning"		Oh Joon-sung		01:41
4.	"Hwarang Spirit" (Opening Title)		Oh Joon-sung		01:37
5.	"Cloud Of Love" (Main Theme)		Oh Joon-sung		02:11
6.	"Night Story Princess"		Oh Joon-sung		02:01
7.	"Open The Gate"		Oh Joon-sung		01:48
8.	"Victory March"		Oh Joon-sung		01:40
9.	"Blossom"		Oh Joon-sung		01:56
10.	"Chorus Of Hwarang"		Oh Joon-sung		01:40
Total length:					22:34

=== Part 9 ===
No.	Title	Lyrics	Music	Artist	Length
1.	"Our Tears" (서로의 눈물이 되어)	Kim Yoo-kyung	Oh Joon-sung	Park Seo-joon	04:23
2.	"Our Tears" (Inst.)		Oh Joon-sung		04:23
Total length:					08:46

=== Part 10 ===
No.	Title	Lyrics	Music	Artist	Length
1.	"Don't Leave Me Alone" (날 혼자 두지마)	June	Oh Joon-sung	Jung Dong-ha	03:50
2.	"Don't Leave Me Alone" (Inst.)		Oh Joon-sung		03:50
Total length:					07:40

=== Charted Songs ===
Chart Performance

Title	Year	Peak chart positions	Sales	Notes
Title	Year	KOR Gaon	Sales	Notes
"It's Definitely You" (V, Jin (BTS))	2016	34	KOR: 76,657	Part 2
"Dream" (Bolbbalgan4)	2016	54	KOR: 47,657	Part 3
"I Can Only See You" (Seulgi, Wendy (Red Velvet))	2017	80	KOR: 24,912	Part 4
"Our Tears" (Hyolyn (Sistar))	2017	50	KOR: 29,357	Part 5
"The Divine Move" (Yoseob (Highlight))	2017	68	KOR: 24,576	Part 6

== Ratings ==
Ep.	Original broadcast date	Average audience share			
Ep.	Original broadcast date	Nielsen Korea		TNmS	
Ep.	Original broadcast date	Nationwide	Seoul	Nationwide	Seoul
1	December 19, 2016	6.9% (NR)	6.8% (NR)	7.9% (18th)	8.5% (11th)
2	December 20, 2016	7.2% (16th)	6.7% (17th)	6.9% (19th)	6.5% (18th)
3	December 26, 2016	13.1% (5th)	13.8% (4th)	11.1% (6th)	11.0% (4th)
4	December 27, 2016	7.5% (17th)	7.2% (17th)	7.4% (19th)	7.8% (15th)
5	January 2, 2017	7.6% (19th)	7.4% (20th)	7.4% (18th)	7.6% (14th)
6	January 3, 2017	8.0% (16th)	7.2% (18th)	7.6% (18th)	8.0% (16th)
7	January 9, 2017	6.9% (NR)	7.2% (18th)	7.2% (19th)	7.5% (17th)
8	January 10, 2017	7.6% (19th)	7.7% (15th)	7.2% (20th)	8.0% (15th)
9	January 16, 2017	6.7% (NR)	7.2% (NR)	6.2% (NR)	6.8% (20th)
10	January 17, 2017	8.3% (12th)	8.2% (12th)	7.1% (18th)	7.5% (18th)
11	January 23, 2017	11.0% (5th)	11.1% (5th)	9.3% (14th)	9.8% (7th)
12	January 24, 2017	10.5% (5th)	10.2% (5th)	8.7% (15th)	8.9% (11th)
13	January 30, 2017	9.7% (16th)	9.1% (16th)	6.9% (NR)	7.9% (NR)
14	January 31, 2017	9.1% (12th)	8.8% (12th)	7.0% (NR)	7.6% (17th)
15	February 6, 2017	8.6% (14th)	8.2% (15th)	6.8% (20th)	6.9% (18th)
16	February 7, 2017	7.9% (13th)	7.4% (14th)	6.4% (18th)	5.8% (NR)
17	February 13, 2017	8.2% (17th)	8.6% (13th)	6.2% (20th)	6.7% (20th)
18	February 14, 2017	7.7% (17th)	7.6% (15th)	6.4% (20th)	6.5% (20th)
19	February 20, 2017	7.6% (19th)	7.4% (17th)	6.0% (NR)	6.8% (NR)
20	February 21, 2017	7.9% (16th)	8.0% (16th)	6.2% (20th)	5.9% (20th)
Average		8.4%	8.3%	7.4%	7.7%
Special	December 16, 2016	2.0% (NR)	(NR)	2.6% (NR)	(NR)
Special	December 26, 2016	4.6% (NR)	(NR)	4.2% (NR)	(NR)
Special	January 30, 2017	2.5% (NR)	(NR)	2.2% (NR)	(NR)
Special	January 30, 2017	3.2% (NR)	(NR)	3.0% (NR)	(NR)
In the table above, the blue numbers represent the lowest ratings and the red numbers represent the highest ratings.; NR denotes that the drama did not rank in the top 20 daily programs on that date.

- On January 30, 2017 at 12:35 (KST), KBS2 aired a 'Lunar New Year' two special episodes condensing the first 12 episodes of the drama into 150 minutes episode.

== Awards and nominations ==
Award ceremony	Year	Category	Nominee	Result	Ref.
31st KBS Drama Awards	2017	Top Excellence Award, Actor	Park Seo-joon	Nominated	
31st KBS Drama Awards	2017	Excellence Award, Actor in a mid-length drama	Park Seo-joon	Nominated	
31st KBS Drama Awards	2017	Excellence Award, Actress in a mid-length drama	Go A-ra	Nominated	
31st KBS Drama Awards	2017	Best Supporting Actor	Choi Won-young	Won	
31st KBS Drama Awards	2017	Best Supporting Actor	Kim Won-hae	Nominated	
31st KBS Drama Awards	2017	Netizen Award	Park Seo-joon	Won	
31st KBS Drama Awards	2017	Netizen Award	Park Hyung-sik	Nominated	
Melon Music Awards	2017	Best OST	"It's Definitely You"	Nominated	
