= Yihwa =

- Gender: Chinese: Unisex; Thai: N/A

Origin
- Origin: Thai (ยิหวา); Korean (이화); Chinese (various, e.g. 怡樺 or 沂華)
- Meaning: Thai: "soul", "heart"; Korean: various, e.g. "plum blossom" or "pear blossom"; Chinese: various

Other names
- Related names: Wanyiwa, etc.

Yihwa is a given name in various cultures.

== In Chinese and Korean ==
In Chinese and Korean, the meaning of the name varies depending on the Chinese characters used to write each syllable of the name. For example, the Chinese-derived Korean words for "pear blossoms" (梨花) and "plum blossoms" (李花) are both pronounced "Yi-hwa" in Korean. There are a great variety of potential meanings, as there are many different hanja with the reading "yi" and many different hanja with the reading "hwa" in Korean. In Chinese Pinyin, the name could also be spelled Yihua.

== In Thailand ==
In Thai, Yihwa (ยิหวา, RTGS: Yiwa, pronounced [jíʔ.wǎː]), also spelled Yiwha and Yiwah, is an uncommon given name meaning "soul" or "heart". It is derived from Javanese: jiwa, in turn from either Sanskrit or Pali jīva, meaning "life". It is often a shortened form of the associated name Wanyiwa (หวันยิหวา, also spelled Wanyihwa, etc.).

== People ==
- Eva Chen (陳怡樺; Chen Yi-hwa; born 1959), Taiwanese businesswoman who founded security firm Trend Micro
- Yihua An (安沂华; born 1970), Chinese doctor
- Wan Yihwa (born 2007), Korean-Burmese singer

== Fictional characters ==
- Yihwa, a character from the 2016 Thai television series Bad Romance and its prequel
- Yi-hwa, main character of the 1977 South Korean film Winter Woman
- Ahn Yi-hwa, character in the 1997 South Korean television drama Star in My Heart
- Shin Yi-hwa, character in the 2007 South Korean film Black House
- Yeon Yi-hwa, character from the South Korean webtoon Tower of God
- Yiwa, character from the Thailand Boy love Series Wedding Plan
