= Haedong =

Korean name
- Hangul: 해동
- Hanja: 海東
Transcriptions
- Revised Romanization: Haedong
- McCune–Reischauer: Haedong

Chinese name
- Traditional Chinese: 海東
- Simplified Chinese: 海东
Transcriptions
Standard Mandarin
- Hanyu Pinyin: Hǎidōng

Japanese name
- Kanji: 海東
- Hiragana: かいとう
Transcriptions
- Revised Hepburn: Kaitō

Haedong (also Haidong, traditional Chinese: 海東; simplified Chinese: 海东; pinyin: Hǎidōng; Korean: 海東; lit. 'east of the sea') may refer to:

- Haidong Prefecture (in the sense of ""east of the Qinghai Lake.")
- a historical term for Korea (viz., from a Chinese perspective)
  - Haedong Seongguk Balhae, a medieval kingdom in northern Korea and southern Manchuria
  - Buddhism in Korea
  - Haedong Goseungjeon "lives of eminent Korean monks"
  - Haedong Gumdo "Korean swordsmanship"

== See also ==
- Names of Korea
