= Wonhwa =

Young class of female warriors of Silla

- Hangul: 원화
- Hanja: 源花 or 原花
- Revised Romanization: Wonhwa
- McCune–Reischauer: Wŏnhwa

The Wonhwa (original flowers) was a system of recruiting military cadets in 6th-century Silla, one of the Three Kingdoms of Korea Created in the reign of King Jinheung, the first group of Wonhwa consisted of about 300 young boys who gathered around two beautiful girls, Junjeong and Nammo. The two girls were able to bring in the 300 boys, presumably from Silla's leadership class, for further training by the military. However, one of the two girls, Junjeong (俊貞), developed jealousy, as more boys liked the other girl, Nammo (南毛), Junjeong killed Nammo by getting her drunk at her house and drowning her in a stream. Junjeong was found guilty, executed, and the cadet system was reformed without girls to bring in boys, but to simply require the upper class to provide their young boys to a national training system based on group boarding. The resulting cadet system, similar to the Spartan Agoge, was the Hwarang.

== See also ==
- History of Korea
- Hwarang
