= Haedong Goseungjeon =

- Hangul: 해동고승전
- Hanja: 海東高僧傳
- Revised Romanization: Haedong goseungjeon
- McCune–Reischauer: Haedong Kosŭng Chŏn

The Haedong Goseungjeon (translated most commonly as the "Lives of Eminent Korean Monks") was a compilation of mostly Korean Buddhist hagiographies, notably of famous monks from the Three Kingdoms period of Korean history.

It was compiled by the monk Gakhun (각훈, 覺訓) (dates unknown) by order of the Goryeo king Gojong in 1215. Though Gakhun was working in the tradition of Chinese Buddhist historiography (which had a long tradition of compiling lives of eminent monks), as was the case with the compilation of the Samguk Sagi and Samguk Yusa, the composing of the Haedong Goseungjeon was meant to promote native exemplars, in this case of Buddhist piety. It also served to bring prominence and merit to the court that ordered its compilation.

The work, along with the Samguk Sagi and the Samguk Yusa, comprises one of the most important sources for the Three Kingdoms period. The monk Iryeon consulted the work some half a century later when compiling his Samguk Yusa.

It was long thought that the work was lost, until portions of it were rediscovered at a Buddhist temple in Seongju in the early twentieth century. Only two of probably more than ten volumes survive. The extant volumes include biographies of eighteen famous and not–so–famous Buddhist monks from Goguryeo and Silla, as well as India and China. Unfortunately, some of the most famous of Three Kingdoms period Buddhist figures are not included (namely Wonhyo), though they were presumably included in the missing volumes.

Not much is known of the work's chief compiler, except that he served as the chief abbot of Yeongtongsa, i.e. the Yeong Tong Temple (영통사, 靈通寺) in the city of Kaesŏng, North Korea, which was then the capital city of Goryeo. His deeds go unrecorded in the Goryeosa (History of Goryeo).

The work was translated into English by Peter H. Lee in 1969.

== Contents ==
The surviving portion of the Haedong Goseungjeon contains the biographies of the following monks (native place):

1. Sundo 順道 (unknown; China?)
2. Mangmyeong 亡名 (Goguryeo)
3. Uiyeon 義淵 (Goguryeo)
4. Damsi/Tanshi 曇始 (China)
5. Mālānanda (Xinjiang)
6. Ado 阿道 (unknown; India?)
7. Beopgong 法空, a.k.a. King Beopheung of Silla (Silla)
8. Beop‘un 法雲 a.k.a. King Jinheung of Silla (Silla)
9. Gakdeok 覺德 (Silla)
10. Ji‘myeong 智明 (Silla)
11. Wongwang 圓光 (Silla)
12. Anham 安含 (Silla)
13. Āryavarman (Silla)
14. Hye‘eup 惠業 (unknown)
15. Hyeryun 惠輪, or 慧輪 (Silla)
16. Hyeon‘gak 玄恪 (Silla)
17. Hyeon‘yu 玄遊 (Goguryeo)
18. Hyeontae 玄太 (Silla)

== See also ==
- Korean Buddhist temples
- List of Korean Buddhists
