= Wan Yihwa =

Burmese-Korean singer (born 2007)

Wan Yihwa ဝါအံၣ်ဟွၤ
- Birth name: Martha Htoowah
- Born: 10 October 2007 (age 17); Myanmar-Thai border
- Origin: Myawaddy-Mae Sot
- Genres: Ballad; trot
- Occupation: Singer-songwriter
- Instrument: Vocals

Martha Htoowah (S'gaw Karen: မီသၤထူဝါ, Burmese: မာသထူးဝါး; born 10 October 2007), known by her stage name Wan Yihwa (Korean: 완이화, S'gaw Karen: ဝါအံၣ်ဟွၤ), is a Korean singer of Karen descent.

== Early life and family ==
Wan was born on 10 October 2007 near the Burmese-Thai border towns of Myawaddy and Mae Sot, as the eldest of three children of Saw Tin Htwe Aye and Sasikan Phongphothandon (also known as Ma Mai), both of Burmese Karen descent. Her father was a well-known Karen singer, who performed under the stage name Htoo Wah until his death in 2014. She was raised in northern Thailand.

In 2016, her family sought asylum in South Korea. In May 2022, Wan's mother died from liver cancer.

== Career ==
In 2018, Wan competed in a regional competition held in Incheon, to select contestants to compete in the annual foreign resident song contest finals. There, she caught the attention of Lee Kyung-ja, the competition's head judge and conductor of the Seogu District Choir. Lee soon began offering free vocal lessons to Wan. In 2019, she released a Burmese-language single, "I Want a Home" (အိမ်လေးတစ် လုံးလိုချင်တယ်). She also was the opening performer at the 24th Busan International Film Festival's red carpet later that year.

In 2020, she was a contestant in KBS' National Trot Championships. She gained popularity for her emotive rendition of Ahn Ye-eun's "Magic Lily" (상사화), which was dedicated to her father.

Following the 2021 Myanmar coup d'état, she released several singles, including "The Spring of Myanmar" and "Everything Will Be Okay" as tributes to democracy and peace in the country, and in memory of fallen protesters, including Kyal Sin.

In May 2023, she was appointed as the honorary ambassador of Gyeonggi Province Fire Services.

== Filmography ==
- My Neighbor, Charles (2019)
- National Trot Championships (2021)
- Yoo Hee-yeol's Sketchbook (2021)
- Immortal Songs (2022)

== Discography ==
- "I Want a Home" (2019)
- Trot National Championship Part 1 (2020)
- "The Spring of Myanmar" (2021)
- "Everything will be Okay" (2021)
- We (2021)
