= Jinji of Silla =

25th monarch of Silla (r. 576–579)

King Jinji

King of Silla
- Reign: 576–579
- Coronation: 576
- Predecessor: Jinheung
- Successor: Jinpyeong
- Died: 17 July 579; Silla
- Burial: North of Yeonggyeong Temple, Gyeongju
- Spouse: Queen Jido
- Issue: Kim Yongchun (김용춘)
Names
- Kim Saryun (김사륜, 金舍輪) or Geumryun (금륜, 金輪)
- House: Kim
- Father: Jinheung
- Mother: Queen Sado

Korean name
- Hangul: 진지왕
- Hanja: 眞智王
- RR: Jinjiwang
- MR: Chinjiwang

Jinji (r. 576–579) was the 25th ruler of the Korean state Silla. He was dethroned three years after his accession.

== Biography ==
King Jinji's birth name was either Saryun (사륜; 舍輪) or Geumryun (금륜; 金輪), and he was the second son of King Jinheung of Silla and Queen Sado of the Park Clan. His elder brother, Crown Prince Dongryun, died in 572 CE, and Saryun was made crown prince.

In 576 CE, Saryun ascended the throne as the 25th king of Silla. His accession to the throne was received with mixed views, with some objecting to his way of life.

== Reign ==
Silla continued to face attacks by Baekje during Jinji's reign. In the second year of his reign (577 CE), Baekje invaded Silla's west. The Silla army under the command of Sejong (세종; 世宗) defeated Baekje, and Jinji had several fortresses, including Naeriseo Fortress (내리서성; 內利西城), built. The next year, however, Silla lost Aryasan Fortress (알야산성; 閼也山城) to Baekje. In 579 CE, Baekje captured three Silla forts, including Naeriseo Fortress, and destroyed several major routes.

In 578 CE, Jinji sent an envoy to the Chen in southern China to maintain their diplomatic relationship.

== End of his reign and death ==
King Jinji was deposed of in 579 on the grounds of political disorder and debauchery by the influential Hwabaek council.

According to the legendarium Samguk yusa, during his reign, the court was in conflict and the officials and ministers were greatly divided. And the non-stop attacks by the Baekje forces caused a great loss for Silla, but the king ignored them and continued with his lavish lifestyle and did nothing but drink and feast with different women. As a result, the officials and his people asked him to abdicate. He died during his confinement, 3 months after his abdication.

According to the entirely fictional Hwarang Segi, he was dethroned by his mother, Queen Sado, for refusing to marry her sister (in some accounts, niece) Mishil. He made a promise to marry her and make her his Queen once he became a king but had a change of heart as soon as he took over the throne. He lost interest in her after falling deeply in love with another woman. They spread a rumor that the heavens had forsaken Silla for having an immoral king, thus resulted in them losing their lands against the Baekje. They asked him to abdicate in order to appease the heavens. He was then sent to confinement and died 3 months later. His nephew who was only 10 years old at that time, was then announced as a new king but since he was still too young to rule, Queen Sado acted as his regent for years.

The king died in July of 578 CE and was given the posthumous name Jinji. He was buried north of Yeonggyeong Temple (영경사; 永敬寺).

== Legends ==
Hwarang Segi says that; King Jinji fell in love with a peasant girl and brought her to the palace to make her one of his concubines. But the woman refused for she was already married to another man. She asked him to let her go and return to her husband.

The king asked her if she knew that she could die for her refusal. The woman told him that she knew but even so, she still refused for she cannot live having two husbands at the same time. The king asked her again if she knew that he could also kill her husband without a problem. the woman told him that she knew but that she would rather die than live with another man. The king then asked her if she would be able to accept him if she wasn't married. The woman replied, "Yes." Finally, he let her go.

That same year, King Jinji abdicated and died. Two years after his death, the woman's husband died as well. Ten days after the husband's death, King Jinji's ghost went on to visit the woman at her house, reminding her that she said that she would accept him if she wasn't married. The woman then told her mother and father-in-law about it and asked them for approval. The parents of the deceased husband gave her permission, out of fear that their son might suffer in the afterlife if they disobeyed the king.

And so, for seven days, the woman's house was filled with smoke and the smell of incense. After seven days, the smoke and scent were gone; King Jinji's ghost left as well. Soon, the woman became pregnant and gave birth to a child named "Bihyeong". When King Jinpyeong found out about it, he took Bihyeong with him and raised him inside the palace.

When Bihyeong grew up, the servants from the palace reported to the king that Bihyeong often left the palace at night. The king asked a servant to follow Bihyeong and find out where he went. As it turns out, Bihyeong was actually meeting with his ghost friends every night on the hills of the Hwangcheon River west of the city. When the king heard of it, he asked Bihyeong to build a bridge on the river. Bihyeong and the ghosts did build the bridge in just one night, naming it Gwigyo, or Ghost Bridge. One of these ghosts' name was Gildal, whom Bihyeong recommended to the royal court. Gildal was given the job of guarding the temple. One night, Gildal transformed into a fox and decided to run away. Bihyeong chased after him and killed him. Because of this, the ghosts started to fear Bihyeong. They decided to leave the palace and never returned. One of the foxes was the so-called gold fox who was later killed by Kim yu-shin as he was trying to harm Kim yu-shin's Lover.

== Family ==
- Father: King Jinheung of Silla (진흥왕; 眞興王; 526–576 CE)
  - Grandfather: Galmunwang Ipjong (입종 갈문왕; 立宗 葛文王; ?–537 CE)
  - Grandmother: Queen Mother Jiso (지소태후; 只召太后; ?–574 CE)
- Mother: Queen Sado of the Park clan (사도왕후 박씨, 思道王后 朴氏( (?–614 CE)
  - Grandfather: Park Yeongsil (박영실; 朴英失)
  - Grandmother: Princess Okjin of the Royal Kim clan (옥진궁주 김씨; 玉珍宮主 金氏)
- Consorts and their respective issue:
1. Queen Jido of the Park clan (지도부인 박씨; 知道夫人 朴氏)
  1. Kim Yongchun (김용춘; 金龍春; 579–646 CE), father of the 29th king Muyeol of Silla
2. Lady Dohwa (도화녀; 桃花女) (only mentioned in the legendarium Samguk yusa)
  1. Kim Bihyeong (김비형; 金鼻荊; 581–? CE)
3. Princess Bomyeong (보명궁주), daughter of Queen Jiso and Gu Jin
  1. Princess Seok-myeong (석명공주)
  2. Princess Yang-myeong ( 양명공주)

== Popular culture ==
- Portrayed by Im Ho in the 2009 MBC TV series Queen Seondeok.
- Portrayed by Son Hyo-won in the 2012 MBC TV series Dream of the Emperor.
- Portrayed in the 2017 KBS TV series Chronicles of Korea

== See also ==
- History of Korea
- Three Kingdoms of Korea
- Queen Seondeok (TV series)

Jinji of Silla House of Kim Died: 579
Regnal titles
Preceded by Jinheung	King of Silla; 576–579	Succeeded by Jinpyeong
