= Wŏn'gwang =

Silla monk (fl. 6th–7th centuries)

- Hangul: 원광
- Hanja: 圓光
- RR: Wongwang
- MR: Wŏn'gwang

Wŏn'gwang (Korean: 원광; Hanja: 圓光; 541–630?), also known as Wŏn'gwang pŏpsa (원광법사; 圓光法士) meaning "Wŏn'gwang Teacher of the Law", was the name of a renowned Buddhist monk, scholar, and teacher of the Silla kingdom during the reign of King Jinpyeong.

His layname was Seol (설 hanja: 薛) or Bak (박 hanja: 朴). Like a great number of other Korean Buddhist monks of the 6th-8th centuries, Wŏn'gwang traveled to China in search of a more thorough grounding in the sacred texts of Buddhism. In 589 Wŏn'gwang went to Sui China, where for eleven years he was educated in the major texts of both Hinayana and Mahayana Buddhism.

Wŏn'gwang returned to Silla in 600 and promulgated the Mahayana form of Buddhism. His method was to teach the faith to the common people free of complex jargon and employing common words.

Wŏn'gwang is best known for his "Five Commandments for Secular Life" (세속오계Sesok-ogye 世俗五戒), which later were attributed as a guiding ethos for the Hwarang. These five commandments were to serve as moral guideposts for the Buddhist layperson. They are an interesting fusion of the Buddhist beliefs and strong sense of patriotism that characterized Silla Buddhism. To Wŏn'gwang, viewing Silla as a true Buddha Land and under constant threat from the neighboring kingdoms of Baekje and Goguryeo, the defense of that land and a Buddhist piety were not at all contradictory. These five principles were as follows:

1. Loyalty to one's lord (事君以忠; 임금은 충성으로써 섬겨야 한다)
2. Devotion towards one's parents (事親以孝; 어버이를 효도로써 섬겨야 한다)
3. Trust among friends (交友以信; 벗은 믿음으로써 사귀어야 한다)
4. Never retreat in battle (臨戰無退; 전쟁에 임하여 물러나지 아니하여야 한다)
5. Be selective in the taking of life (殺生有擇; 함부로 살생을 하지 말아야 한다)

The precise dates of Wŏn'gwang‘s life are unknown.

Wŏn'gwang‘s biography appears in the 13th century Haedong Goseungjeon.

== Popular culture ==
- Portrayed by Lee Dae-ro in the 2012–2013 KBS1 TV series Dream of the Emperor.
