= Ichadon =

Silla Buddhist monk (506–527)

- Hangul: 이차돈
- Hanja: 異次頓
- RR: Ichadon
- MR: Ich'adon

Ichadon (Korean: 이차돈; Hanja: 異次頓; 501 AD – 527 AD (Note: Dates in the Korean calendar (lunisolar))) was a Silla Buddhist monk and the advisor to King Beopheung. He was also known as Kŏch'adon (거차돈; 居次頓), or by his courtesy name, Yŏmch'ok (염촉; 厭觸), or Yŏmdo, (염도; 厭都),

== Miracle ==
The Samguk yusa tells a mythical tale detailing Ichadon's contribution to state-sponsored Buddhism:

Early in his reign, Beopheung had desired to promulgate Buddhism as the state religion. However, officials in his court opposed him. In the fourteenth year of his reign, Beopheung's "Grand Secretary", Ichadon, devised a strategy to overcome court opposition. Ichadon schemed with the king, convincing him to make a proclamation granting Buddhism official state sanction using the royal seal. Ichadon told the king to deny having made such a proclamation when the opposing officials received it and demanded an explanation. Instead, Ichadon would confess and accept the punishment of execution, for what would quickly be seen as a forgery.

Ichadon prophesied to the king that at his execution a wonderful miracle would convince the opposing court faction of Buddhism's power. Ichadon's scheme went as planned, and the opposing officials took the bait. When Ichadon was executed on the 15th day of the 9th month in 527, his prophecy was fulfilled; the earth shook, the sun was darkened, beautiful flowers rained from the sky, his severed head flew to the sacred Geumgang mountains, and milk instead of blood sprayed 100 feet in the air from his beheaded corpse. The omen was accepted by the opposing court officials as a manifestation of heaven's approval, and Buddhism was made the state religion in 527 CE. Ichadon's body was then taken to the Geumgang mountains and buried there with respect. His martyrdom led to the construction of Heungnyunsa, Silla's first state-sponsored temple.

== Historical context ==
According to the Samguk yusa, his family name was Pak. His mother's family was descended from the father of Jijeung of Silla. In Silla before Buddhism was recognized, Shamanism, which regarded Bak Hyeokgeose as a god, was popular. In response, King Beopheung wanted to use Ichadon, a descendant of Hyeokgeose, to establish Buddhism as a state religion and Ichadon accepted the sacrifice.

== See also ==
- Korean Buddhism
