= Sesok-ogye =

Korean moral code

- Hangul: 세속 오계
- Hanja: 世俗五戒
- Revised Romanization: Sesok Ogye
- McCune–Reischauer: Sesok Ogye

The Sesok-ogye, or just Ogye, are the five secular rules (and part of the moral code) of the Hwarang (an elite warrior group of the Silla dynasty) formulated by Buddhist monk Won Gwang consisting of five rules:

- Loyalty to the country (originally: Fealty to the king)
- Respect and obey one's parents (i.e. filial piety)
- Show trust among friends (i.e. candor and sincerity)
- Never retreat in battle
- Kill only with selective reasoning

These were (part of) the rules that the Hwarang had to abide by.

The code is still used by many Korean martial artists and can be found in gyms around the world.
