= Roof-end Tile with Human Face Motif =

Silla-era Korean roof tile

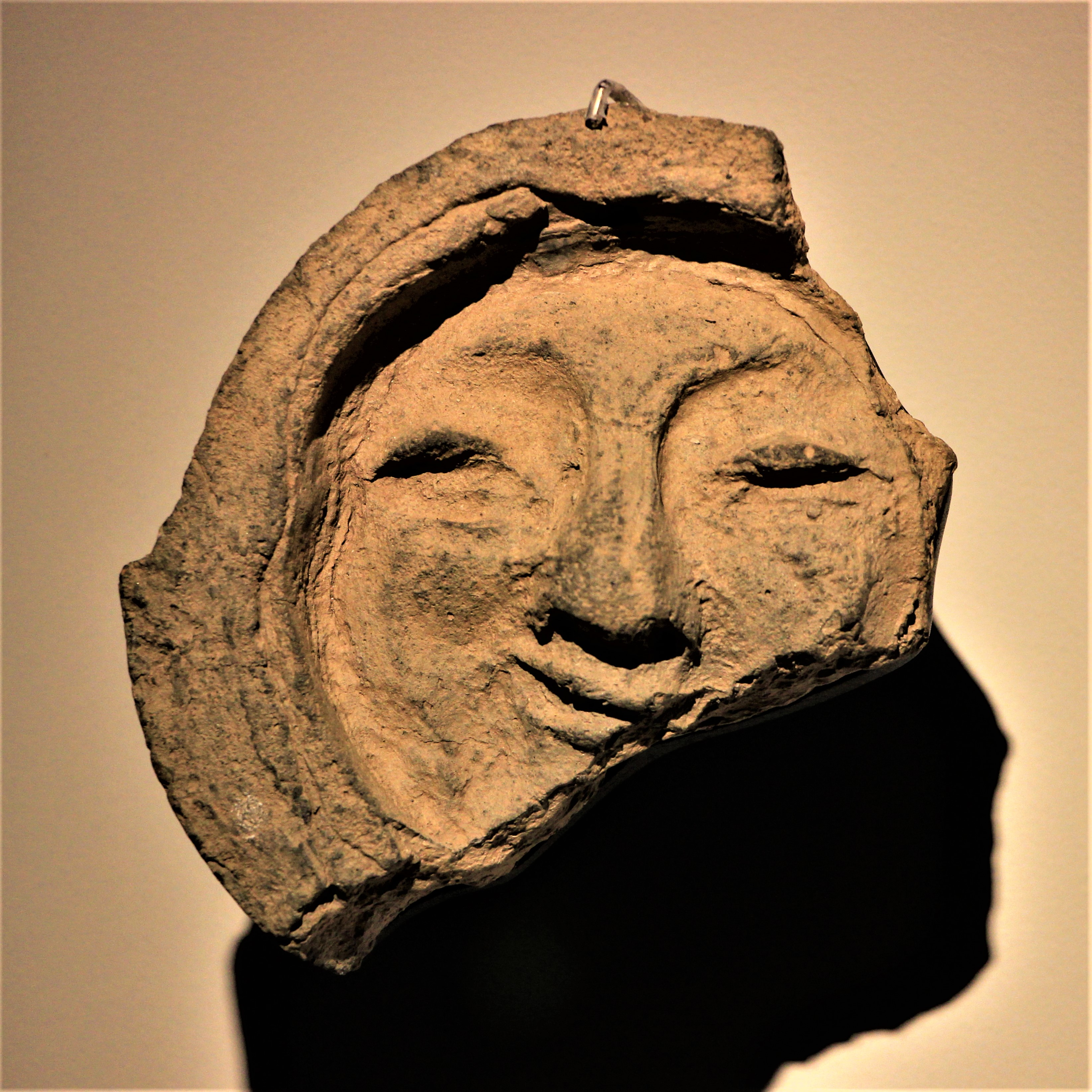
- The tile
- Discovered: 1932; Gyeongju, Korea under Japanese rule

The Roof-end Tile with Human Face Motif (Korean: 경주 얼굴무늬 수막새), commonly called a sumaksae (convex roof-end tile) and nicknamed the Smile of Silla (신라의 미소), is a Silla-era (57 BCE – 935 CE) ornamental roof tile found in Gyeongju, South Korea. It was designated as Treasure of South Korea No. 2010 on November 27, 2018.

The tile depicts a smiling human face and is considered an iconic symbol of Gyeongju. It is held in the collection of the Gyeongju National Museum. While most Silla eave tiles were produced using molds, this piece is the only known surviving example made by hand.

== History ==
The tile was recovered from the former site of Yeongmyosa, a Silla temple in Gyeongju (initially identified as Hŭngnyunsa at the time of discovery).

In June 1934, Ōsaka Kintarō (大坂金太郞; 1877–1974), then director of the Gyeongju branch of the Government-General Museum, published a paper on the tile. Later that year, Japanese doctor and art collector Tanaka Toshinobu (田中敏信; 1908–1993) bought the piece from an antique dealer in Korea and took it to Japan between 1935 and 1940, in violation of heritage export restrictions.

In February 1972, Park Il-hun (박일훈; 1913–1975), director of the Gyeongju National Museum, traveled to Japan and requested the return of the artifact. Tanaka agreed and formally donated the tile to the Gyeongju National Museum on October 14, 1972.

== Artistic significance ==
Unlike most contemporary East Asian eave tiles, which featured lotus motifs or grotesque masks (Gwi-myeon-wa) intended to ward off evil spirits, this piece shows a human face with a distinct smile.

Art historians note the subtle smile formed by the lips, cheeks, and eyes, which gave rise to its popular nickname, the "Smile of Silla" (Korean: 신라의 미소). Although the lower-right section is missing, the surviving portion retains high-relief details, showing the technique of Silla craftsmen.

== Legacy ==
The tile's motif has been widely adapted for public symbolism and commercial design. Regionally, it served as the official mascot for the 1998 Gyeongju World Culture Expo and was later incorporated into the official emblem for the 2025 APEC Summit held in Gyeongju. In commercial design, its iconic smile served as the inspiration for the corporate logo of LG Corporation.
