= Yihua An =

Chinese medical scientist

Yihua An (Chinese: 安沂华; pinyin: Ān Yíhuá; born February 1970) is the chairmen of Stem Cell Transplantation Center (also called as Department of Neural Stem Cells) in the General Hospital of Chinese People's Armed Police Forces. Till the end of 2013 he has treated over 7,000 patients with stem cell therapy with his medical team, involving many diseases, such as cerebral palsy, spinal cord injury, traumatic brain injury, diabetes, ulcerative colitis and cirrhosis.

He has also been the leader of many research programs and funded research projects. All of these have been successfully completed. Until now Yihua An has published more than 70 research papers in the core journals at home and abroad, including 20 English papers recorded by SCI.
