= Queen Seondeok (TV series) =

2009 South Korean historical drama television series

- Also known as: The Great Queen Seondeok
- Hangul: 선덕여왕
- Hanja: 善德女王
- RR: Seondeok yeowang
- MR: Sŏndŏk yŏwang
- Genre: Historical Fiction; Romance; Action
- Created by: Lee Chang-seop (MBC Drama Division)
- Written by: Kim Young-hyun; Park Sang-yeon
- Directed by: Kim Geun-hong; Park Hong-kyun
- Starring: Lee Yo-won; Go Hyun-jung; Park Ye-jin; Uhm Tae-woong; Kim Nam-gil
- Music by: Lim Ha-young
- Country of origin: South Korea
- Original language: Korean
- No. of episodes: 62

Production
- Producers: Park Myeong-guk; Mik Tae-won; Kim Ho-young; Yoo Hyeon-jong
- Camera setup: Multi-camera
- Running time: 60~65
- Production company: Time Box Production

Original release
- Network: MBC
- Release: 25 May – 22 December 2009

Queen Seondeok (Korean: 선덕여왕) is a 2009 South Korean historical drama television series produced by MBC and Time Box Production for the former's 48th founding anniversary, starring Lee Yo-won, Go Hyun-jung, Uhm Tae-woong, Kim Nam-gil, and Park Ye-jin. It chronicles the life of Queen Seondeok of Silla. It aired on MBC from 25 May to 22 December 2009 on Mondays and Tuesdays at 21:55 for 62 episodes.

The viewership ratings for the show topped TV charts almost every week during its run, peaking at 43.6 percent. It swept the 2009 MBC Drama Awards; actress Go Hyun-jung's performance and subsequent grand prize win received near-universal acclaim.

== Synopsis ==
The series begins at the end of King Jinheung's reign and continues until the end of Queen Seondeok's reign. Deokman was born as one of the twin daughters of King Jinpyeong and Queen Maya, but due to a prophecy, King Jinpyeong had to send his daughter away from the palace with the help of his clumsy but loyal servant Seohwa, in order to save Queen Maya from being ousted by Mishil, whose ambition was to become Queen. Seohwa raised Deokman as if she were her own, but a turn of events eventually led Deokman into finding out her real identity - only to be abandoned once again by her family in order to save the throne from Mishil's hand, with the exception of her twin sister Cheonmyeon, who ended up losing her life while trying to help Deokman escape. Out of hatred, Deokman set out to take back what was taken from her and avenge her sister by bringing Mishil down and becoming the first female king of Silla with the help of her trusted friend, Yushin, and troubled rogue Bidam who she loved, and ultimately led a rebellion near the end of her reign because of a misunderstanding.

== Cast ==
=== Main ===
- Lee Yo-won as Princess Deokman, later Queen Seondeok
  - Nam Ji-hyun as young Deokman

A charismatic, yet solitary ruler: She was known as the first female ruler in Korean history. Deokman was born as the twin sister of Princess Cheonmyong and had a close brush with death as a baby due to the attempted assassination by Mi-shil, who had ambitions for the throne. A loyal servant named So-hwa rescued her by fleeing the kingdom with her. She loves to be around people, but after becoming a queen, she lost the liberty to trust them as sincerely and innocently as she once did. As ruling queen, she is deeply lonely and filled with despair. Yet she must hide her true feelings and stand on her own to be reborn as a true king.

- Go Hyun-jung as Lady Mishil
  - Uee as young Mishil

Archenemy of Queen Seondeok: A Royal concubine who will stop at nothing in order to achieve her dream of becoming a Queen. She rose to power as a result of her relationships with prominent rulers and officials. She was concubine to three successive Silla kings: King Jinheung, King Jinji, and King Jinpyeong. She was the wife of Lord Sejong (the prime minister), the lover of General Seolwon and the mother of Bidam.

- Park Ye-jin as Princess Cheonmyeong
  - Shin Se-kyung as young Cheonmyeong
  - Kim You-jung as 10-year-old Cheonmyeong

Princess Cheonmyeong was Princess Deokman's twin sister, as the firstborn daughter, King Jinpyeong choose her to stay in the palace in the belief that she was the destined child who will bring Mishil down someday. She grew up fearing Mishil which led to her living a life out of politics. She fell in love and married King Jinji's son Kim Yongsu but one day, Kim Yongsu was nominated as a possible candidate for the throne but had to prove himself worthy of it which in the end caused him his death. Believing that Mishil had her hand on his death, she set out gathering allies in order to bring Mishil down one day. She was the first person to find out about Deokman's real identity and did everything she can in order to help her sister which costs her life.

- Uhm Tae-woong as Kim Yushin
  - Lee Hyun-woo as young Kim Yushin

The invincible warrior forever remembered by history: With a grand vision of unifying the three kingdoms under Silla's rule, he aligns himself with Princess Deokman who puts her complete trust on him. He became an invincible warrior, admired by all in the capital. He earns a well-deserved place in history, the very thing that Bidam desires.

- Kim Nam-gil as Bidam
  - Park Ji-bin as young Bidam

The glorious downfall of a tragic hero: Bidam inherits the life of Mishil, and their story comes to an end. The tragedy of his mother's life comes full circle and he becomes the wretched hero of the same fate. Ultimately he gains nothing he desires - not a place in history, Silla nor Deokman - and ends up forgotten by history, recorded only as the instigator of a mutiny. He is loved then hated, he gains power only to lose it, he earns the trust of people and then loses that trust. He will crash and burn, and his end will be tragic and glorious.

=== Supporting ===
- Yoo Seung-ho as Kim Chunchu (later King Taejong Muyeol)
  - Jung Yoon-seok as young Kim Chunchu

Ruler of the next age and ruler of the Three Kingdoms: This series began with Misil's age, continues through Deokman's age and will end at the start of Chunchu's age. This precocious genius will find his own footing alongside Deokman, Yusin, and Bidam, and gain power in his own way. Ultimately he will be the one to uphold the dream that began with the late King Jijeung and unify the Three Kingdoms.

- Lee Seung-hyo as Kim Alcheon
  - Ho Hyo-hoon as young Kim Alcheon

He is most well known as Deokman's staunch supporter and bodyguard. He was initially cold and looked down on Kim Yushin and the Yonghwa Hyangdo. Deokman earns his respect during the war with Baekje, and then his loyalty later on. He is Yushin's war comrade and close friend. Along with Yushin, he is with Deokman until her final days.

- Jung Ho-bin as Gukseon Munno

The 8th leader of Hwarang warriors and the Gukseon. Along with Mishil, Seolwon, and Sadaham, they were the people who King Jinheung trusted the most during his era. He helps rescue young Princess Deokman from the palace to protect the royal house. He also took care of Bidam, per the request of King Jinji. He is later killed by Yeomjeong while compiling the Geographical Survey of the Three Kingdoms after Yeomjeong learns that he planned to give the books to Yushin.

- Jo Min-ki as King Jinpyeong
  - Baek Jong-min as young Jinpyeong
  - Kang San as child Jinpyeong

Deokman and Cheonmyeong's father. He was a weak king. He was placed on the throne after Mishil dethroned King Jinji.

- Yoon Yoo-sun as Queen Maya
  - Park Soo-jin as young Maya

King Jinpyeong's wife, mother of Deokman and Cheonmyeong. She is extremely devoted to her husband. In her early days, Mishil tried to murder Maya after Maya witnessed the Hwarang putting makeup on their faces. Mishil then tried to take Maya's place as queen, however, Munno saved Maya, and her twins, from falling to her death.

- Seo Young-hee as Sohwa

Maidservant to Jinpyeong and Maya, foster mother of Deokman. She brought Deokman to the desert and raised her there until Chilsuk found them. She "died" once in the desert trying to save Deokman. She dies a second time in an attempt to protect Deokman also.

- Im Ye-jin as Lady Manmyeong

Jinpyeong's older sister; Kim Yushin's mother, and Kim Seohyeon's wife. She had eloped with Kim Seohyeon in her younger days. Her princess status was not restored until the Queen Mother had forgiven her.

- Jung Sung-mo as Kim Seo-hyun

Manmyeong's husband; Kim Yushin's father. He is of Gaya descent and on the hwabaek council.

- Park Jung-chul as Kim Yong-su

King Jinji's eldest son; Princess Cheonmyeong's husband. He was originally named heir after Princess Cheonmyeong's three younger siblings die (because of the prophecy), and he goes out to war to prove himself. However, he is killed because of Mishil.

- In Gyo-jin (Note: Credited as Do Yi-sung.) as Kim Yong-chun

King Jinji's 2nd son, a government minister; Princess Cheonmyeong's ally and confidante. He was a pungwolju (prior to Hojae) and later served on the hwabaek council. He remains loyal to the royal house and becomes Deokman's ally later on.

- Shin Goo as Eulje

Senior government minister, friend to King Jinpyeong. He does everything he can to protect the royal house, even if it meant trying to kill Deokman. He is later stripped of his titles by King Jinpyeong.

- Jung Woong-in as Misaeng

Mishil's younger brother; the 10th leader of Hwarang warriors. He was also a father to over 100 children.

- Dokgo Young-jae as Sejong

Mishil's husband, the Prime Minister and 6th leader of Hwarang warriors

- Jeon No-min as Seolwon

Mishil's lover, the Minister of Defense and 7th leader of Hwarang warriors.

- Kim Jung-hyun as Hajong

Mishil and Sejong's son, a government minister and the 11th leader of Hwarang warriors

- Baek Do-bin as Bojong
  - Kwak Jung-wook as young Bojong

Mishil and Seolwon's son, a Hwarang commander

- Song Ok-sook as Seori

Chief mudang of Shilla, an old friend of Mishil and Misaeng

- Ahn Gil-kang as Chilsook

Formerly a Hwarang, agent of Mishil. He was given the task to find the lost twin. 15 years later, he found Deokman in the desert.

- Lee Moon-sik as Jookbang

A con artist who rips off the young Deokman and later joins Yu Shin's Hwarang

- Ryu Dam as Godo

A con artist who rips off the young Deokman and later joins Yu Shin's Hwarang)

- Kang Sung-pil as Santak

Seokpum's, and later Bidam's, aide-de-camp

- Joo Sang-wook as Wolya

Last prince of Gaya and the leader of the Bokya. He was adopted by Kim Seohyeon, and then replaced Yushin as Yonghwa Hyangdo's leader. Yushin earns Wolya's loyalty after letting the Gaya refugees stay on the Kim family's private land.

- Jung Ho-keun as Seolji

Kayan commander; he is loyal to Wolya.

- Choi Won-young as General Gyebaek
- Jun Young-bin as Gok Sa-heun
  - Jung Hyung-min as young Gok Sa-heun
- Park Young-seo as Daepung
  - Lee Suk-min as young Daepung
- Go Yoon-hoo as Hojae

The 14th leader of Hwarang warriors (pungwolju), later a council member of the hwabaek.

- Hong Kyung-in as Seokpum
  - Noh Young-hak as young Seokpum

Commander of a Hwarang loyal to Misil. He comes from a poor family, but Misil gives him his elevated status--this is why he is so loyal to Misil.

- Kang Ji-hoo as Imjong
  - Kim Seok as young Imjong

Commander of a Hwarang loyal to Kim Yong-choon

- Seo Dong-won as Deokchung
  - Lee Do-hyun as young Deokchung
- Jang Hee-woong as Bakui
  - Seo Sang-won as young Bakui
- Lee Sang-hyun as Piltan
  - Kim Tae-jin as young Piltan
- Kim Dong-hee as Wangyoon
  - Choi Woo-sung as young Wangyoon
- Ryu Sang-wook as Dae Nam-bo
  - Kim Sang-bin as young Dae Nam-bo

The most prominent of Misaeng's sons, a Hwarang commander

- Choi Sung-jo as Seonyeol
  - Oh Eun-suk as young Seonyeol
- Kim Dong-soo as Hyeopseong
- Moon Ji-yoon as Siyeol
  - Shin Tae-hoon as young Siyeol
- Jung Hye-sun as Lady Man-ho

Jinpyeong and Manmyeong's mother

- Park Eun-bin as Boryang

Bojong's daughter; Kim Chunchu's wife

- Qri as Youngmo

Hajong's daughter; Kim Yushin's wife

- Mametkulovs Mansur as Katan

Roman, possibly Jewish, trader who teaches Latin to the young Deokman

- Seo Kang as Yangkil
- O Yeong-su as Wolcheon abbot
- Mahbub Alam as Tibetan man (토번인)

=== Cameos ===
- Lee Soon-jae as King Jinheung (ep 1)
- Im Ho as King Jinji (ep 1)
- Kim Yo-han as Child Martial Artist (Ep. 4)
- Park Jae-jung as Sadaham (ep 13)

Mishil's first love

== Ratings ==
- In the table below, the blue numbers represent the lowest ratings and the red numbers represent the highest ratings.

| Episode | Original Broadcast date | TNMS ratings | | AGB ratings | |
| Episode | Original Broadcast date | Nationwide | Seoul | Nationwide | Seoul |
|---|---|---|---|---|---|
| 1 | 25 May 2009 | 16.0% | 17.1% | 15.3% | 16.8% |
| 2 | 26 May 2009 | 16.6% | 17.8% | 15.5% | 17.2% |
| 3 | 1 June 2009 | 21.3% | 23.3% | 18.2% | 20.3% |
| 4 | 2 June 2009 | 22.3% | 23.8% | 20.3% | 21.7% |
| 5 | 8 June 2009 | 21.6% | 23.7% | 20.6% | 23.8% |
| 6 | 9 June 2009 | 25.2% | 27.1% | 23.3% | 25.2% |
| 7 | 15 June 2009 | 27.9% | 30.0% | 25.8% | 27.3% |
| 8 | 16 June 2009 | 29.7% | 32.0% | 26.9% | 29.1% |
| 9 | 22 June 2009 | 28.1% | 30.0% | 25.8% | 27.6% |
| 10 | 23 June 2009 | 27.9% | 29.4% | 25.5% | 26.8% |
| 11 | 29 June 2009 | 29.4% | 30.8% | 27.8% | 29.4% |
| 12 | 30 June 2009 | 29.2% | 30.5% | 29.1% | 30.7% |
| 13 | 6 July 2009 | 29.9% | 31.6% | 29.0% | 30.9% |
| 14 | 7 July 2009 | 31.0% | 31.9% | 30.0% | 31.8% |
| 15 | 13 July 2009 | 31.6% | 32.8% | 30.9% | 33.5% |
| 16 | 14 July 2009 | 31.7% | 33.5% | 31.0% | 34.0% |
| 17 | 20 July 2009 | 30.7% | 32.0% | 30.4% | 32.8% |
| 18 | 21 July 2009 | 32.8% | 34.4% | 30.5% | 32.6% |
| 19 | 27 July 2009 | 32.7% | 34.1% | 32.0% | 34.0% |
| 20 | 28 July 2009 | 34.9% | 36.0% | 34.6% | 36.3% |
| 21 | 3 August 2009 | 31.9% | 33.2% | 29.7% | 31.2% |
| 22 | 4 August 2009 | 35.4% | 36.4% | 33.2% | 35.5% |
| 23 | 10 August 2009 | 37.5% | 39.6% | 35.6% | 38.0% |
| 24 | 11 August 2009 | 39.5% | 41.7% | 38.0% | 40.5% |
| 25 | 17 August 2009 | 39.0% | 40.4% | 37.6% | 39.1% |
| 26 | 18 August 2009 | 42.0% | 44.3% | 39.7% | 41.7% |
| 27 | 24 August 2009 | 40.3% | 41.7% | 38.4% | 41.1% |
| 28 | 25 August 2009 | 42.0% | 43.6% | 41.0% | 43.1% |
| 29 | 31 August 2009 | 42.2% | 44.7% | 40.0% | 41.5% |
| 30 | 1 September 2009 | 42.1% | 44.4% | 41.7% | 44.0% |
| 31 | 7 September 2009 | 43.5% | 45.4% | 39.7% | 42.3% |
| 32 | 8 September 2009 | 40.6% | 42.9% | 38.4% | 39.8% |
| 33 | 14 September 2009 | 40.6% | 42.1% | 39.9% | 41.7% |
| 34 | 15 September 2009 | 42.3% | 43.9% | 40.0% | 43.2% |
| 35 | 21 September 2009 | 41.6% | 44.6% | 40.8% | 44.4% |
| 36 | 22 September 2009 | 39.6% | 41.1% | 38.9% | 42.3% |
| 37 | 28 September 2009 | 39.1% | 40.3% | 36.9% | 39.9% |
| 38 | 29 September 2009 | 39.5% | 40.4% | 38.2% | 40.6% |
| 39 | 5 October 2009 | 39.3% | 40.6% | 39.2% | 41.3% |
| 40 | 6 October 2009 | 39.6% | 40.6% | 39.7% | 43.4% |
| 41 | 12 October 2009 | 38.1% | 39.9% | 38.1% | 40.3% |
| 42 | 13 October 2009 | 38.0% | 38.8% | 37.9% | 40.2% |
| 43 | 19 October 2009 | 38.3% | 38.8% | 37.2% | 39.3% |
| 44 | 20 October 2009 | 37.6% | 38.7% | 37.8% | 40.4% |
| 45 | 26 October 2009 | 39.3% | 41.5% | 38.3% | 40.9% |
| 46 | 27 October 2009 | 40.8% | 43.0% | 39.4% | 42.3% |
| 47 | 2 November 2009 | 41.7% | 43.7% | 39.6% | 42.1% |
| 48 | 3 November 2009 | 42.4% | 44.1% | 40.2% | 42.6% |
| 49 | 9 November 2009 | 44.9% | 46.7% | 43.6% | 45.8% |
| 50 | 10 November 2009 | 44.4% | 46.1% | 43.3% | 45.7% |
| 51 | 16 November 2009 | 42.3% | 44.4% | 39.0% | 42.2% |
| 52 | 17 November 2009 | 37.7% | 39.1% | 38.1% | 41.1% |
| 53 | 23 November 2009 | 35.0% | 36.1% | 34.8% | 37.4% |
| 54 | 24 November 2009 | 36.5% | 38.3% | 34.1% | 36.8% |
| 55 | 30 November 2009 | 35.3% | 36.0% | 35.3% | 37.8% |
| 56 | 1 December 2009 | 36.9% | 38.0% | 34.5% | 37.4% |
| 57 | 7 December 2009 | 38.0% | 39.1% | 34.0% | 36.2% |
| 58 | 8 December 2009 | 36.2% | 37.9% | 34.4% | 35.7% |
| 59 | 14 December 2009 | 35.8% | 36.4% | 32.3% | 33.9% |
| 60 | 15 December 2009 | 35.8% | 37.4% | 32.8% | 34.5% |
| 61 | 21 December 2009 | 35.1% | 37.1% | 32.3% | 34.5% |
| 62 | 22 December 2009 | 37.7% | 39.7% | 35.7% | 38.5% |
| Special | 28 December 2009 | 12.5% | 12.3% | 13.4% | 14.7% |
| Average | | 35.1% | 36.6% | 33.6% | 35.8% |

== Filming location ==
It was filmed on location at MBC Dramia in Cheoin District, Yongin, Gyeonggi Province. Other historical dramas such as Dong Yi, Moon Embracing the Sun and Jumong were also filmed there. It was filmed at the Shilla Millennium Park in Gyeongju.

== Artistic license ==
The series adopted significant artistic license regarding the portrayal of historical events in order to accommodate the dramatic storyline. Notably, the reign of King Jinpyeong was compressed by over two decades such that in the series, Queen Seondeok was born within a year of his coronation (her actual date of birth is unknown). Accordingly, the preceding King Jinheung's reign was extended by a similar period, with him being depicted as an elderly man at his death. This allowed for Mishil and other prominent figures during Jinheung's reign to be involved in events concerning the Queen during her time as Royal Princess, even though there is no evidence to suggest what sort of interaction the two had if any. Artistic license was used to imagine her as being of a similar age to Kim Yushin and Bidam, though again, it is not clear historically if this was the case. Another major change was in the date of her death: Bidam's execution and Kim Alcheon's appointment to his post were ordered by Jindeok of Silla, ten days after Queen Seondeok's death. Queen Jindeok is not mentioned in the series. Most dramatically, the real Seondeok likely never left Silla (stories concerning her childhood in the palace survive) and, although Byzantine artifacts did reach Silla during her childhood and reign, it is highly unlikely that she ever learned Greek.

== Plagiarism controversy ==
On 31 December 2009, Kim Ji-young, an obscure playwright and representative of Great Works Ltd., a culture content company, filed a plagiarism lawsuit against MBC and screenwriters Kim Young-hyun and Park Sang-yeon, saying they plagiarized her script for Seondeok, Queen of Mugunghwa, an unperformed musical she said she wrote in 2005. Kim argued that the development of the story and conflict between characters were similar to her play, including discord between two major female characters, Seondeok and Mishil; a romance between Deokman and General Kim Yushin; and the story of the young Deokman wandering through a desert. The MBC drama contains all of these plot twists, which are not based on history but which Kim says she invented. Kim said she shared some of her scripts with the Korea Creative Content Agency to attract investment in the musical, and believed that was how the content was leaked. Kim asked for ₩200 million in compensation and an injunction banning the broadcast of the soap opera. The injunction was turned down and Queen Seondeok ran from May to December 2009, but the copyright infringement case continued.

The MBC network and the series' writers maintained they did not know of the existence of Kim's play. MBC had copyrighted its script in May 2008. After Kim requested an assessment by experts, the Seoul Southern District Court asked Seoul National University's Center for Law & Technology to investigate. In a process called a "script autopsy," the center first identifies similar content in the two scripts. At that point, university historians confirm historical facts regarding the characters and plot, and differentiate them from literary creations. Afterward, the center makes an appraisal based on copyright laws, then the court makes the final adjudication. In February 2011, the SNU Center for Law & Technology confirmed the plagiarism.

In December 2012, the High Court ruled in favor of plaintiff Kim Ji-young that Queen Seondeok was a work of plagiarism, and fined MBC ₩200 million (US$186,000). In its ruling, the court stated that though the characters and the details were in fact different, "the overall plot was the same" and it is "most probable that the network relied on the script and plot of the musical to produce their drama." Furthermore, any additional reruns on cable TV and internet, and the making of DVD and related books were banned.

== Awards and nomination ==
| Year | Award | Category | Recipient | Result | Ref |
|---|---|---|---|---|---|
| 2009 | Grimae Awards | Daesang Award | Kim Geun-hong / Park Hong-kyun | Won | |
| 2009 | Grimae Awards | Best Actress | Lee Yo-won | Won | |
| 2009 | Job Korea | Best Actress | Go Hyun-jung | Won | |
| 2009 | MBC Drama Awards | Grand Prize (Daesang) | Go Hyun-jung | Won | |
| 2009 | MBC Drama Awards | Top Excellence Award - Actress | Lee Yo-won | Won | |
| 2009 | MBC Drama Awards | Top Excellence Award - Actress | Go Hyun-jung | Nominated | |
| 2009 | MBC Drama Awards | Top Excellence Award - Actor | Uhm Tae-woong | Won | |
| 2009 | MBC Drama Awards | Excellence Award - Actor | Kim Nam-gil | Won | |
| 2009 | MBC Drama Awards | Excellence Award - Actor | Jeon No-min | Nominated | |
| 2009 | MBC Drama Awards | Excellence Award - Actress | Park Ye-jin | Nominated | |
| 2009 | MBC Drama Awards | Golden Acting Award - Supporting Actor | Ahn Gil-kang | Won | |
| 2009 | MBC Drama Awards | Golden Acting Award - Supporting Actress | Seo Young-hee | Won | |
| 2009 | MBC Drama Awards | Best New Actor | Yoo Seung-ho | Won | |
| 2009 | MBC Drama Awards | Best New Actor | Lee Seung-hyo | Won | |
| 2009 | MBC Drama Awards | Best New Actor | Kim Nam-gil | Nominated | |
| 2009 | MBC Drama Awards | PD Award | Shin Goo | Won | |
| 2009 | MBC Drama Awards | Best Young Actress | Nam Ji-hyun | Won | |
| 2009 | MBC Drama Awards | Writer of the Year | Kim Young-hyun / Park Sang-yeon | Won | |
| 2009 | MBC Drama Awards | Best Couple Award | Kim Nam-gil and Lee Yo-won | Won | |
| 2009 | MBC Drama Awards | Popularity Award - Actor | Kim Nam-gil | Nominated | |
| 2009 | MBC Drama Awards | Popularity Award - Actor | Lee Seung-hyo | Nominated | |
| 2009 | MBC Drama Awards | Popularity Award - Actor | Yoo Seung-ho | Nominated | |
| 2009 | MBC Drama Awards | Popularity Award - Actress | Go Hyun-jung | Nominated | |
| 2009 | MBC Drama Awards | Popularity Award - Actress | Lee Yo-won | Nominated | |
| 2009 | MBC Drama Awards | Popularity Award - Actress | Park Ye-jin | Nominated | |
| 2009 | MBC Drama Awards | Viewer's Favorite Drama of the Year | Queen Seondeok | Won | |
| 2009 | MBC Drama Awards | Special Award - Martial Arts Director | Kim Sung-shil | Won | |
| 2009 | DramaBeans Awards | Favourite Drama of 2009 | Queen Seondeok | Nominated | |
| 2009 | DramaBeans Awards | Top 3 Favourite Drama of 2009 | Queen Seondeok | Nominated | |
| 2009 | DramaBeans Awards | Favourite Historical Drama | Queen Seondeok | Won | |
| 2009 | DramaBeans Awards | Favourite Character | Go Hyun-jung | Nominated | |
| 2009 | DramaBeans Awards | Favourite Character | Kim Nam-gil | Nominated | |
| 2009 | 10th Korea Visual Arts Festival | Photogenic Award | Lee Yo-won | Won | |
| 2010 | Korea Producers & Directors' Awards | PD Award - Acting | Go Hyun-jung | Won | |
| 2010 | 46th Baeksang Arts Awards | Daesang / Grand Prize - TV | Go Hyun-jung | Won | |
| 2010 | 46th Baeksang Arts Awards | Best New Actor - TV | Kim Nam-gil | Won | |
| 2010 | 46th Baeksang Arts Awards | TV Screenplay Award - TV | Kim Young-hyun | Nominated | |
| 2010 | 46th Baeksang Arts Awards | Best Actress Award - TV | Go Hyun-jung | Nominated | |
| 2010 | 46th Baeksang Arts Awards | Directing Award - TV | Park Hong-gyun | Nominated | |
| 2010 | 46th Baeksang Arts Awards | Best Picture - TV | Queen Seondeok | Nominated | |
| 2010 | 46th Baeksang Arts Awards | Female Popularity Award - TV | Go Hyun-jung | Nominated | |
| 2010 | 46th Baeksang Arts Awards | Female Popularity Award - TV | Park Ye-jin | Nominated | |
| 2010 | 37th Korea Broadcasting Awards | Best Actress | Go Hyun-jung | Won | |
| 2010 | 37th Korea Broadcasting Awards | Best Art Direction | Queen Seondeok | Won | |
| 2010 | 37th Korea Broadcasting Awards | Best Lighting | Queen Seondeok | Won | |
| 2010 | 37th Korea Broadcasting Awards | Best Video Graphics | Queen Seondeok | Won | |
| 2010 | 5th Seoul International Drama Awards | Best Drama Series | Queen Seondeok | Won | |
| 2010 | 5th Seoul International Drama Awards | Outstanding Korean Actress - TV | Go Hyun-jung | Won | |
| 2010 | 5th Seoul International Drama Awards | Outstanding Korean Screenwriter | Kim Young-hyun / Park Sang-yeon | Won | |
| 2010 | Asia Model Awards | Special Award for Asian Drama | Lee Yo-won | Won | |
