= Queen Jiso =

Korean regent

Queen Jiso (Korean: 지소태후; ? – 574) was a Korean honorary queen and regent. She was the spouse of prince Galmunwang Ipjong (입종 갈문왕) and the queen mother of king Jinheung of Silla. She acted as Regent during the minority of her son, from his ascent at the age of seven in 540 until 551, a position earned by both her noble bloodline and her political wisdom. During this regency, she completed building projects, such as the Heungryunsa Temple. She also ordered the creation of works of literature and history, such as the great work of National History.

== Family ==
- Father: King Beopheung of Silla (r. 514–540 AD)
- Mother: Queen Kim of the Kim clan (조생부인 김씨)
- Spouses:
  - Galmunwang Ipjong, the son of King Jijeung of Silla
    - Son: Jinheung of Silla (526–576; reign 540–576)–known as Kim Sammaekjong (김삼맥종), was the 24th monarch of Silla
    - Son: Kim Sugheuljong (김숙흘종)
  - Yi Hwarang (이화랑), 4th Pungwolju
    - Daughter: Madame Manho (만호태후)
    - Son-in-law: Crown Prince Dongryun (동륜태자; ? – 572)
      - Grandson: Jinpyeong of Silla (567? – 632, reign 579 – 632) –was the 26th king of the Silla
  - Kim Isabu (이사부)
    - Son: Lord Sejong (世宗公 세종공, ?–588), 6th Pungwolju (561-568, 572)
    - Daughter: Princess Sukmyeong (숙명궁주; ? – 603)
      - Son-in-law: King Jinheung of Silla
  - Park Yeong-sil (박영실)
    - Daughter: Princess Hwanghwa (황화공주)
    - Daughter: Princess Songhwa (송화공주
      - Son-in-law: Galmunwang Bokseung
  - Gu Jin (구진)
    - Daughter: Princess Bomyeong (보명궁주)
      - Son-in-law: King Jinheung of Silla
      - Son-in-law: King Jinji of Silla
      - Son-in-law: King Jinpyeong of Silla

== Popular culture ==
- Portrayed by Kim Ji-soo in 2016–2017 KBS2 TV series Hwarang: The Poet Warrior Youth.
- Portrayed by Ryu Min-Jeong in the 2017 KBS TV series Chronicles of Korea
