= Ye-won =

- Hangul: 예원
- RR: Yewon
- MR: Yewŏn
- IPA: [jewʌn]

Ye-won is a Korean given name.

People with this name include:

- Kang Ye-won (born 1980), South Korean actress
- Kim Ye-won (actress, born 1987) (born Kim Shin-ah, 1987), South Korean actress and singer
- Yewon (born 1989), South Korean singer and actress, former member of girl group Jewelry
- Jang Ye-won (born 1990), South Korean television presenter
- Kim Ye-won (actress, born 1997), South Korean actress
- Kim Ye-won (born 1998), stage name Umji, South Korean singer, member of girl group Gfriend
- Choi Ye-won (born 1999), stage name Arin, South Korean singer, member of girl group Oh My Girl

== See also ==
- List of Korean given names
