= Kim Taemun =

Early 8th-century Korean historian

- Hangul: 김대문
- Hanja: 金大問
- RR: Gim Daemun
- MR: Kim Taemun

Kim Taemun (Korean: 김대문; fl. early 8th century) was a historian of Silla. He was the governor of Hansan in 704. According to book 46, in the biography section of Samguk Sagi, he wrote several books including Hwarang Segi. Kim Taemun was a noble from the chinggol class. The period of survival is believed to span the units of King Sinmoon, King Hyoso and King Seongdeok.

== Books ==
- Tales from Gyerim (계림잡전, Gyerim is an old word for Silla)
- Records of Hansan(한산기)
- Biographies of Monks of the Ancient (고승전)
- Book of Music (악본)
- Annals of the Hwarang (Hwarang Segi) : A manuscript of Hwarang Segi was found in Gimhae, South Korea in 1980s, but its historical validity is questioned and believed to be a forgery.

None of these works survive today.

== See also ==
- History of Korea
- Unified Silla
