= Killing of Kyal Sin =

Burmese woman killed in 2021 Myanmar protests

Kyal Sin at the Protests

Kyal Sin (Burmese: ကြယ်စင်), also known as Angel or by her Chinese name, Deng Jiaxi (邓家希), was a 19-year-old woman from Mandalay who was killed on 3 March 2021 during the 2021 Burmese protests. Kyal Sin emerged as an early martyr and symbol of resistance against the military junta's use of violence to suppress the protest movement. She was one of several teenagers and young adults who gave up their lives in the protests. As of 13 March, around 60 civilians had lost their lives; more than a third of the dead are teenagers.

== Personal background ==
Kyal Sin was born to a Kokang Chinese mother and a Yunnanese father from Mainland China. She voted for the first time in November 2020.

Kyal Sin was a taekwondo instructor and champion, and worked as a singer and dancer.

== Protest and death ==
During the 2021 Myanmar coup d'état, Kyal Sin began to express her support online for arrested civilian leader Aung San Suu Kyi and the ruling National League for Democracy.

On 3 March 2021, she participated in a protest in Mandalay wearing a black T-shirt emblazoned with Everything will be OK. A photograph of her wearing the T-shirt has become iconic.

During the protest, she is reported to have broken open a water pipe to allow protestors to wash tear gas from their eyes, thrown a tear gas canister back at police, and encouraged protestors to take cover when live rounds were fired.

While she was on the front line of the protest she was shot dead. Prior to the event, she had made a Facebook post stating her blood type in case she was injured and her wish for her organs to be donated should she die during the protest.

Her funeral on 4 March 2021 was attended by several thousands of protesters.

The next day, authorities went to the cemetery where her remains were buried and exhumed the body for autopsy.
