= Hwarang Segi =

Korean historical text of disputed authenticity

- Hangul: 화랑세기
- Hanja: 花郞世記
- RR: Hwarang segi
- MR: Hwarang segi

Hwarang segi (Korean: 화랑세기; Hanja: 花郞世記; lit. 'Annals of Hwarang; Generations of the Hwarang') was a historical record of the Hwarang (lit. flower boys but referring to an elite warrior group of male youth) of the Silla kingdom in ancient Korea. It is said to have been written by Silla historian Kim Taemun(fl. 704) in the reign of Seongdeok the Great (r. 702~737).

It was believed lost since the 13th century, resurfaced in 1989 when two handwritten manuscripts were publicly unveiled. These manuscripts, owned by Park Chang-hwa and later by his student Kim Jong-jin, were revealed in two parts: a 32-page extract in 1989 and a 162-page "mother text" in 1995. Both texts, written by Park, detail the lives of the hwarang leaders from the ancient Korean kingdom of Silla. The manuscripts' authenticity has been rejected by most of scholars considering it as fictional works by Park. Regardless of their origin, the Hwarang segi is significant for its unique perspective on early Korean history.

== History ==
The Hwarang segi survived to the time that Kim Pusik (1075–1151) compiled the Samguk sagi, but is believed to have been lost since the 13th century, because no reference to the Hwarang segi was made after reference to the text found in monk Gakhun's 覺訓 Haedong goseung jeon 海東高僧傳 (Lives of Eminent Korean Monks, ca. 1215). However, two handwritten manuscripts of a text titled Hwarang segi were suddenly made public in 1989. It had been owned by a man named Park Chang-hwa, who worked at the Japanese Imperial Household Library during the Japanese Colonial period. The manuscript was kept by his student, Kim Jong-jin, and Kim's wife, Kim Kyung-ja, made it public to the media in 1989. The 32-page excerpt was released at the time and when Hwarang Segi was unveiled, Park had already died. (1889~1962) The first manuscript, which was made public in 1989, is typically called the "extract" (balchwebon, 발췌본, 拔萃本), and contains a preface and short accounts of the first fifteen pungwolju (풍월주, 風月主) or leaders of the hwarang. The second manuscript, which was revealed by Park Chang hwa's son in 1995, is usually called "the mother text" (mobon, 모본， 母本) and contains a 162-page manuscript. Because the first part of the manuscript was damaged and missing, it begins with a fragmented but fuller account of the fourth pungwolju, continues with more detailed accounts of the first fifteen pungwolju, and concludes after an account of the thirty-second and final pungweolju. Both manuscripts are in the handwriting of Park Chang-hwa 朴昌和(1889–1962), who was skilled in literary Chinese and also worked for the Imperial Library in Tokyo during the Colonial period. The historical validity of these Hwarang Segi manuscripts is still in controversy among many scholars of early Korea and Korean studies. Most scholars think of this as a novel although some argue for its authenticity.

For those who argue for the authenticity of the manuscripts, the importance of Hwarang segi is that is one of the scarce historical works about Silla by a person of Silla himself, and it is free from Confucian dogma and morality. If the Hwarang segi manuscripts are authentic, later historians have based their understanding of Three Kingdoms era on Goryeo Dynasty sources like Samguk sagi and Samguk yusa. However, even if it turns out to be Park Chang-hwa's novel, its value as a historical source is likely to be recognized. For instance, Lee Do Heum from Hanyang University suggested that "Hwarang segi," written by Park Chang-hwa, could be a manuscript of the original "Hwarang segi," or a reprint of the original manuscript in later years.

The manuscript known as the Hwarang Segi extract is made of 16 parts; one for the introduction and the fifteen for the biographies of fifteen pungwolju leaders of the hwarang. They are:

1. Introduction
2. Wihwarang
3. Mijinbu
4. Morang
5. Ihwarang
6. Sadaham
7. Sejong
8. Seolwonrang
9. Munno
10. Biborang
11. Miseng
12. Hajong
13. Bori
14. Yongchun
15. Horim
16. Kim Yusin

== Bibliography ==
- McBride, Richard D., II. "The Hwarang segi Manuscripts: An In-Progress Colonial Period Fiction." Korea Journal 45, no. 3 (Autumn 2005): 230-260.
- McBride, Richard D., II. "Silla Buddhism and the Hwarang segi Manuscripts." Korean Studies 31 (2007): 19-38.
- McBride, Richard D., II. "Silla Buddhism and the Hwarang segi Manuscripts." Tongguk sahak 東國史學 (Seoul) 44 (June 2008): 35-71.
- McBride, Richard D., II. "Pak Ch’anghwa and the Hwarang segi Manuscripts." Journal of Korean Studies 13, no. 1 (Fall 2008): 57-88.

== See also ==
- Three Kingdoms of Korea
- History of South Korea
