= Beopheung of Silla =

23rd monarch of Silla (r. 514–540)

King Beopheung 법흥왕 法興王

King of Silla
- Reign: 514–540
- Coronation: 514
- Predecessor: Jijeung of Silla
- Successor: Jinheung of Silla
- Died: 540; Silla
- Spouse: Lady Bodo of the Park clan
- Issue: Princess Jiso
Era name and dates
- Geonwon (건원, 建元): 536−550
Posthumous name
- King Beopheung (法興王, 법흥왕)
- House: Kim
- Father: King Jijeung of Silla
- Mother: Lady Yeonje of the Park Clan

Korean name
- Hangul: 법흥왕
- Hanja: 法興王
- RR: Beopheungwang
- MR: Pŏphŭngwang

Beopheung (r. 514–540 AD) was the 23rd monarch of Silla, one of the Three Kingdoms of Korea. He was preceded by King Jijeung (r. 500–514) and succeeded by King Jinheung. His name was inscribed on Bongpyeong Silla Stele and Cheonjeonri Petroglyphs as Mojeukji (牟卽智, 另卽智). In Chinese literature, his name was written as Mojin (募秦) as well.

== Reign ==
He was said to be tall, generous and sociable. After ascending the throne, he restructured the administrative system and preferred a central management to strengthen royal authority. In 520, he issued the Yullyeong (율령) law, which codified the bone-rank system of Silla. In 536, he introduced his own era name as Geonwon (건원, 建元), which was important to show royal authority and independence both at home and abroad.

During his reign, Silla continued to expand. In 532, Guhyeong, the king of Geumgwan Gaya surrendered, in return Beopheung made him a high ranking official of the conquered areas. Silla also annexed Ara Gaya, thus gaining access to the Nakdong river basin. In 522, Daegaya tried to prevent being conquered by offering a marriage alliance, which Beopheung accepted: he gave away the sister of Minister Bijobu (비조부) in marriage to the ruler of Daegaya.

By the time of Beupheung's reign, Buddhism had become fairly common in Silla, as it had been introduced much earlier by Goguryeo monks during King Nulji's reign. One of King Beopheung's ministers, a man named Ichadon, was a Buddhist convert who had even shaved his head and took the tonsure. He constantly implored the king to adopt Buddhism as the state religion, and in fact King Beopheung himself had become fond of Buddha's teachings. However, the other ministers of Silla were greatly opposed to this, and expressed such defiance to the king. Beopheung, having been persuaded by his ministers, was at a crossroads, and encountered great reluctance to change. At this time, Ichadon suggested his own martyrdom and pleaded with the king to execute him in public for the cause of Buddhism. This the king refused to do, and so Ichadon deliberately insulted the ministers of the kingdom, thus provoking the anger of the king. In the end, Ichadon was executed in public, but before his head was cut off, he stated that the blood spilled from his body would not be red but milky white. According to the Samguk yusa, his predictions proved correct, and Ichadon's milky blood horrified the ministers of the kingdom. As a result of Ichadon's martyrdom, King Beopheung finally chose Buddhism as the state religion. However, true Buddhist freedom in Silla would not begin until the reign of King Jinheung.

The king was himself a devoted Buddhist, in his later years he became a monk by the name of Beobun (법운). According to the Samguk Yusa, his wife also became a Buddhist nun named Myobeop (묘법) and had a temple built. According to the Samguk sagi, Beopheung was buried at Aegongsa (애공사) temple. His burial place today is Historic Site 176.

Beopheung sent a tribute mission to the Emperor Wu of Liang in 523. This envoy visited Liang China with the help of Baekje. In this tribute, Baekje represents Silla as a subordinate to Baekje. However, Silla acknowledges this because Baekje is needed to guard against Goguryeo and Japan.

== Family ==
- Father: Jijeung of Silla (437–514) (r. 500–514)
- Mother: Lady Yeonje of the Park Clan (연제부인박씨)
- Wife: Lady Bodo of the Park clan(보도부인 (保刀夫人) 박씨)
  - Daughter: Queen Jiso (지소태후; ? – 574) married Galmunwang Ipjong (입종 갈문왕)
    - Grandson: Jinheung of Silla
    - Grandson: General Mijinbu (미진부; 525–548), 2nd Pungwolju

== Popular culture ==
- Portrayed by Park Geun-Hyung in the 1987 KBS1 TV series Ichadon

== See also ==
- List of Korean monarchs#Silla
- History of Korea
- Korean Buddhism

Beopheung of Silla House of Kim Died: 540
Regnal titles
Preceded by Jijeung	King of Silla; 514–540	Succeeded by Jinheung
