= Jinheung of Silla =

24th monarch of Silla (r. 540–576)

Jinheung the great

King of Silla
- Reign: 540–576
- Coronation: 540
- Predecessor: Beopheung
- Successor: Jinji
- Born: 534
- Died: 576; Silla
- Spouse: Queen Sado
Names
- Kim Sammaekjong (김 삼맥종, 金彡麥宗) or Simmaekbu (심맥부, 深麥夫)
Era name and dates
- Gaeguk (개국, 開國, 551-567); Daechang (대창, 大昌, 568-571); Hongje (홍제, 鴻濟, 572-584)
Posthumous name
- Jinheung Wang
- House: Kim
- Father: Galmunwang Ipjong
- Mother: Queen Jiso

Korean name
- Hangul: 진흥왕
- Hanja: 眞興王
- RR: Jinheungwang
- MR: Chinhŭngwang

King Jinheung (534–576; reign 540–576) was the 24th monarch of Silla, one of the Three Kingdoms of Korea.

== Reign ==
He followed King Beopheung (r. 514–540) on the throne. Jinheung was the nephew and also the grandson of King Beopheung. Jinheung was responsible for expanding Silla territory immensely. He and King Seong 26th king of Baekje, struggled with each other over the Han River valley.

=== Rise to the throne ===
Jinheung of Silla rose to the throne at age 7 when his predecessor and paternal uncle and maternal grandfather, Beopheung, died. Since he was too young to rule a kingdom at the time, his mother Queen Jiso acted as regent. When he became of age, he began to rule independently. This is signalled by the era name change in 551. Jinheung adopted a policy of peace with the neighbouring kingdom of Baekje Kingdom. In 551, he allied with Baekje so that he could attack the northern Korean kingdom of Goguryeo. The result of this allied attack on Goguryeo was the conquest of the Han river estuary. The kingdoms of Baekje and Silla agreed on splitting the conquered territory equally between themselves.

=== Expansion ===
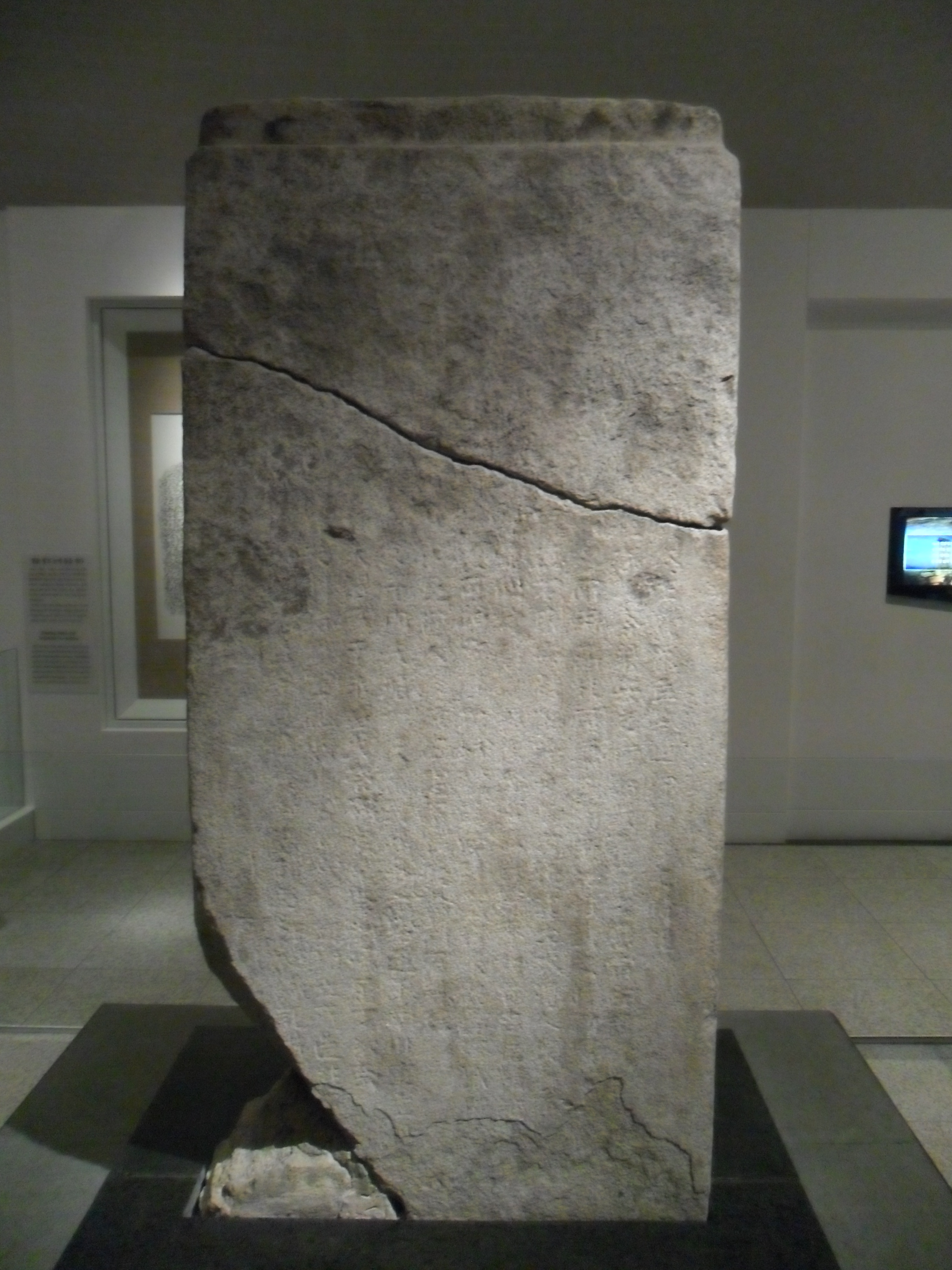
Stele built to honor the expedition of Silla King Jinheung in Seoul, 555 AD

In 541, Kim Isabu was appointed Head of Military Affairs, and he played a large role in expanding the territory of the kingdom. During the reign of King Seong of Baekje, King Jinheung allied with Goguryeo and launched an attack on the Han River valley during the year 553. In a secret agreement between Silla and Goguryeo, Silla troops attacked the exhausted Baekje army in late 553, despite the fact that Jinheung married Seong's daughter and made her a sobi (lesser consort). Feeling the betrayal from Silla, King Seong attacked during the year 554, but was caught in an ambush led by a Silla general and was assassinated along with those who were accompanying him. King Jinheung guarded the new territory with a firm hand for seven years before sending General Kim Isabu to conquer Daegaya in 561.

King Jinheung constructed a monument in his newly conquered territory and established provinces in the area. He subdued all rebellions and continued to develop culture in his kingdom. In 576, the Hwarang system of young warriors was established, who didn't only learn martial arts but were also cultivating arts and music, and had their own moral code system. The access to the Han river valley allowed Silla to have direct contact with the Chinese dinasties.

=== Buddhism and culture ===
The newly established direct contact with China allowed Silla to acquire buddhist relics and to use religion as a means of solidifying royal authority. During Jinheung's reign, several buddhist temples were established, for example the Hwangnyongsa in Gyeongju. Buddhist monks were given official roles in the royal court. The king himself was a devote buddhist, he considered himself Chakravarti (the ideal, universal ruler) and gave his sons names accordingly. His last era name was also named according to a buddhist principle: he considered comforting people who were hurting due to the constant wars of utmost importance.

Jinheung also ordered the compilation of Silla's history, which became the Guksa (국사, 國史, "History of the Nation"), which did not survive, but it appears that Samguk sagi, written later in Goryeo was using it as one of the sources for the Silla history it tells.

=== Death and succession ===
King Jinheung died in 576 at the age of 42. His 26-year rule of Silla was characterised by conquest and advancement. King Jinheung was succeeded by his second son, Prince Saryun, who became King Jinji of Silla, as Crown Prince Dongryun died in 572.

== Family ==
- Father: Galmunwang Ipjong (입종 갈문왕)
  - Grandfather: King Jijeung of Silla (신라 지증왕; 437 – 514)
  - Grandmother: Queen Yeonje of the Miryang Park clan (연제태후 박씨)
- Mother: Queen Jiso (지소태후; ? – 574)
  - Grandfather: King Beopheung of Silla (신라 법흥왕; ? – July 540)
  - Grandmother: Princess Bodo of Silla (보도부인)

=== Consorts and their respective issue(s) ===
1. Queen Sado of the Park clan (사도왕후 박씨; ? – February 614)
  1. Crown Prince Dongryun (동륜태자; ? – 572)
  2. King Jinji of Silla (신라 진지왕; ? – 24 August 579)
  3. Kim Gu-ryun (김구륜)
  4. Princess Taeyang (태양공주)
  5. Princess Ayang (아양공주)
  6. Princess Eunryun (은륜공주)
  7. Princess Wolryun (월륜공주)
2. Princess Sukmyeong (숙명궁주; ? – 603)
  1. Crown Prince Jeongsuk (정숙태자)
3. Princess Bomyeong (보명궁주)
4. Lady Mishil (미실궁주)
  1. Prince Sujong (수종전군)
  2. Princess Banya (반야공주)
  3. Princess Nanya (난야공주)
5. Unknown Lady, daughter of Baekje king Seong (as 소비, "smaller consort")
6. Princess Wolhwa (월화궁주)
  1. Prince Cheonju (천주공)
  2. Princess Deokmyeong (덕명공주)
7. Lady Geumjin (금진낭주)
  1. Princess Nanseong (난성공주)

== Legacy ==
King Jinheung's achievements for his kingdom established the basis for unification of Korea. He is remembered today by the Korean people as one of the greatest rulers of Silla.

== Popular culture ==
- Portrayed by Lee Soon-jae in the 2009 MBC TV series Queen Seondeok.
- Portrayed by Park Hyung-sik in the 2016–2017 KBS2 TV series Hwarang: The Poet Warrior Youth.
- Portrayed by Kim Yoon Hong in the 2017 KBS TV series Chronicles of Korea
- Portrayed by Kim Seung-soo in the 2021 KBS2 TV series River Where the Moon Rises
- Portrayed by Kim Myung-Soo in the 2023 ENA TV series Moon in the Day

== See also ==
- List of Korean monarchs#Silla
- History of Korea

Jinheung of Silla House of Kim Born: 526 Died: 576
Regnal titles
Preceded by Beopheung	King of Silla; 540–576	Succeeded by Jinji
