= Index of Baekje-related articles =

Articles about Baekje-related people, places, things, and concepts include:

== A ==
- Abe no Hirafu
- Ajikgi
- Asin of Baekje

== B ==
- Baekje
- Battle of Baekgang
- Battle of Hwangsanbeol
- Beop of Baekje
- Biryu of Baekje
- Biyu of Baekje
- Gwisil Boksin
- Bunseo of Baekje
- Buyeo County
- Buyeo National Museum
- Buyeo Pung
- Buyeo Yung

== C ==
- Chaekgye of Baekje
- Chiljido
- Chogo of Baekje

== D ==
- Daifang commandery
- Daru of Baekje
- Dongseong of Baekje

== G ==
- Gaero of Baekje
- Gaeru of Baekje
- Geunchogo of Baekje
- Geungusu of Baekje
- Gilt-bronze Incense Burner of Baekje
- Giru of Baekje
- Goi of Baekje
- Guisin of Baekje
- Gusu of Baekje
- Gwalleuk, Buddhist monk who traveled to Japan.
- Gye of Baekje

== H ==
- Hye of Baekje

== J ==
- Jeonji of Baekje
- Jinsa of Baekje

== K ==
- Kyŏn Hwŏn

== M ==
- Mahan confederacy
- Mu of Baekje
- Munju of Baekje
- Muryeong of Baekje

== N ==
- Neungsan-ri

== O ==
- Onjo of Baekje

== P ==
- Pungnap Toseong

== S ==
- Saban of Baekje
- Sabi
- Samgeun of Baekje
- Seong of Baekje

== U ==
- Uija of Baekje
- Ungjin

== W ==
- Wang In
- Wideok of Baekje
- Wiryeseong

== See also ==
- History of Korea
- Rulers of Korea
- Three Kingdoms of Korea
