= The King of Legend =

2010 South Korean historical drama

- Promotional poster
- Also known as: King Geunchogo
- Hangul: 근초고왕
- Hanja: 近肖古王
- RR: Geunchogowang
- MR: Kŭnch'ogowang
- Genre: Period drama Action
- Written by: Jung Sung-hee; Yoo Seung-ryul
- Directed by: Yoon Chang-bum; Kim Young-jo
- Starring: Kam Woo-sung; Kim Ji-soo; Lee Jong-won; Lee Ji-hoon; Ahn Jae-mo
- Country of origin: South Korea
- Original language: Korean
- No. of episodes: 60

Production
- Executive producer: Lee Jae-young
- Producers: Shin Hyun-soo; Han Chul-kyung
- Running time: Saturdays and Sundays at 20:55 (KST)

Original release
- Network: Korean Broadcasting System
- Release: 6 November 2010 – 29 May 2011

The King of Legend (Korean: 근초고왕; lit. 'King Geunchogo') is a 2010 South Korean historical series based on King Geunchogo of Baekje. Besides historical information from the historical texts Samguk sagi and Samguk yusa, it was also inspired by a novel written by Yi Munyeol, a renowned Korean writer. The drama aired on KBS1 in South Korea, and internationally through KBS World.

== Synopsis ==
The drama tells the story of a warrior king of Baekje. Under his reign, the kingdom experienced its glory days, with military conquests that saw him controlling most of the Korean Peninsula and a subsequent enhancement of Baekje's political power that was the greatest height of Baekje's power. The drama initially references Seoul at the site of Pungnaptoseong in 2010 then flashes back 1,700 years to Hansan, Baekje in which the subject declares to found a new kingdom on that land near the West Sea. Yeogu, the ousted prince, is banished to a life of selling salt to suppress any fears that he, being the second son, could attempt to take over the throne.

== Cast ==
- Kam Woo-sung as Buyeo Gu/King Geunchogo (13th Eoraha of Baekje)
- Kim Ji-soo as Buyeo Hwa/Princess of Wirye/Sosukdang (Buyeo Jun's daughter; Go Sayu's second queen; Buyeo Gu's second wife and first queen)
- Lee Jong-won as Go Sayu/King Gogugwon (16th King of Goguryeo)
- Lee Ji-hoon as Hae Gun (Jwapyeong Hae Nyeong's son)
- Ahn Jae-mo as Jin Seung (Jwapyeong Jin Jeong's son)
- Lee Se-eun as Wi Hongran/Jin Hongran/Wanwoldang (Wi Birang's sister; Jin Jeong's adopted daughter; Buyeo Gu's first wife and second queen)
- Yoon Seung-won as King Biryu (11th Eoraha of Baekje)
- Seo In-seok as Duke Heukgang Sahul (King Biryu's father)
- Choi Myung-gil as Hae Sosul/Wanwoldang (King Biryu's first queen; Buyeo Jun's second wife and first queen)
- Kim Do-yeon as Jin Saha/Sosukdang (King Biryu's second queen)
- Lee Jong-soo as Buyeo Chan
- Lee Byung-wook as Buyeo Hwi
- Kim Tae-hoon as Buyeo San
- Han Jin-hee as Buyeo Jun/King Gye (Prince of Wirye, later 12th Eoraha of Baekje)
- Ahn Shin-woo as Buyeo Min
- Choi Ji-na as Seok Rahae (Buyeo Min's wife)
- Hwang Dong-Joo as Buyeo Mun
- Kim Bo-mi as Lady Hae/Sosukdang (Buyeo Jun's wife and second queen; Hae Sosul's cousin)
- Jung Woong-in as Wi Birang (grandson of King Mayeo of Eastern Buyeo)
- Kang Sung-jin as Payun
- Kim Hyo-won as Jwapyeong Jin Jeong (leader of the Jin clan)
- Kim Gi-bok as Jwapyeong Hae Nyeong (leader of Hae clan)
- Kim Hyeong-il as Jin Godo
- Jung Ui-Kap as Bu Gantae (leader of the Malgal Tribe)
- Kim Eung-soo as Jobul (Goguryeo prime minister)
- Jeon Byung-ok as Ko Naja (Goguryeo general)
- Park Chul-ho as Ko Chisu (Goguryeo general)
- Won Seok-Yeon as Sou (Goguryeo minister)
- Kim Joo-young as King Onjo (1st Eoraha of Baekje)
- Lee Deok-hwa as Go Jumong/King Dongmyeong (1st King of Goguryeo)
- Jung Ae-ri as Soseono (King Dongmyeong's queen and second wife, later founder of Baekje)
- Park Jung-woo as King Yuri (2nd King of Goguryeo)
- Han Jung-soo as Bok Gugeom
- Uhm Kyung-wan as Naman
- Jeon Gwang-jin as Sa Gi (Sa Chungseon's son)
- Hahm Eun-jung as Jin Ai (Jin Godo's daughter)
- Qri as Buyeo Jin
- Lee In as Ajikai
- Park Geon-il as Soekkop/Buyeo Gusu
- Jung Hong-chae as Dugo
- Jin Sung as Go Gubu/King Sosurim (17th King of Goguryeo)
  - Jung Yoon-seok as young Go Gu-bu

== Production notes ==
- Ungniha River (욱리하; 郁里河), mentioned in the drama is now known as Han River (한강; 漢江)
- Hansan (한산; 閑山) is also one of the former names of Seoul, after Wiryeseong (위례성; 慰禮城, Baekje era), Hanyang (한양; 漢陽, Goryeo era), Hanseong (한성; 漢城, Joseon era) and Gyeongseong (경성; 京城, Japanese colonial era)
- The Seven-Branched Sword (칠지도; Chiljido in Korean), (七支刀; 七枝刀; shichishitō or nanatsusaya no tachi in Japanese) marks the friendly relationship between Baekje and Japan during Buyeo Gu's reign
- The titles of the kings in this drama differ, as kings of Baekje were known as "Eoraha", while those of Goguryeo were known as "Taewang"
- When Buyeo Gu reclaimed the throne of Baekje upon the death of King Gye in 346, it marked the end of the alternating kingship of two lines, and sealed the permanent ascendancy of the descendants of the 5th Eoraha, King Chogo over those of 8th Eoraha, King Goi, which is reflected in his reign name, Geunchogo; the ascendancy lasted until the 31st and last Eoraha of Baekje, King Uija, when he surrendered to the Silla-Tang forces in 660
- Go Sayu, or King Gogugwon of Goguryeo, would be later killed by Geunchogo's son, Buyeo Gusu (later 14th Eoraha of Baekje) when the Baekje army captured Goguryeo's capital at South Pyeongyang Fortress (present-day Pyongyang, North Korea)

== Awards and nominations ==
Award	Year	Category	Nominee	Result
18th Korean Culture and Entertainment Awards	2010	Excellence Award, Actress in a Drama	Lee Se-eun	Won
KBS Drama Awards	2011	Excellence Award, Actress in a Serial Drama	Kim Ji-soo	Nominated
KBS Drama Awards	2011	Excellence Award, Actor in a Serial Drama	Kam Woo-sung	Nominated
