= Bunseo of Baekje =

10th King of Baekje (r. 298–304)

Bunseo 분서
- Eoraha

King of Baekje
- Reign: 298 – 304 A.D.
- Coronation: 298 A.D.
- Predecessor: Chaekgye
- Successor: Biryu
- Born: Buyeo Bunseo; Unknown; Wiryeseong
- Died: 304 A.D. Wiryeseong
- Issue: Buyeo Gye
- House: Buyeo
- Dynasty: Baekje
- Father: Chaekgye
- Mother: Lady Bogwa
- Occupation: King

- Bunseo of Baekje
- Hangul: 분서왕
- Hanja: 汾西王
- RR: Bunseowang
- MR: Punsŏwang

King Bunseo (died 304, r. 298–304) was the tenth king of Baekje, one of the Three Kingdoms of Korea.

== Background ==
He was the eldest son of King Chaekgye. He became king upon Chaekgye's death in 298 when he was killed in battle during the 13th year of his reign. The Samguk sagi records that "from his youth he was bright and intelligent, and in his performance of rites he was bold and upright. His father the king loved him, and never separated him from his side".

== Reign ==
He continued to wage war against the Chinese Lelang commandery whose forces had killed his father. In 304, he captured a western district of the Lelang commandery. According to the Samguk sagi, the governor of the commandery thereupon sent an assassin who killed him.

Samguk sagi:

- 298 AD, winter, tenth month. There was a great amnesty.
- 299 AD, spring, first month. The king visited Dongmyeong shrine.
- 302 AD, summer, fourth month. A comet was seen during the day.
- 304 AD, spring, second month. The king secretly led an army to go and take the western territory of Lelang commandery. Winter, tenth month. The king was killed by an assassin sent by the master of Lelang commandery.

== Legacy ==
With the death of Bunseo, a descendant of the 8th king Goi, the rival royal line descended from the 5th king Chogo, retook the throne, except for the brief rule of Bunseo's son Gye as the 12th king.

== Family ==
- Father: Chaekgye of Baekje
- Mother: Lady Bogwa (보과부인; 寶菓夫人) - daughter of the governor of Daifang commandery.
  - Queen(s): unknown
    - Son: Buyeo Gye (扶餘契, ?–346) - eldest son, 12th King of Baekje, Gye of Baekje.

== See also ==
- List of monarchs of Korea
- History of Korea

Bunseo of Baekje House of Buyeo Cadet branch of the House of Go Died: 304
Regnal titles
Preceded by Chaekgye	King of Baekje; 298–304	Succeeded by Biryu
