= Gye of Baekje =

12th King of Baekje (r. 344–346)

Gye 계
- Eoraha

King of Baekje
- Reign: November 344 ~ September 346 A.D.
- Coronation: November 344 A.D.
- Predecessor: Biryu
- Successor: Geunchogo
- Born: Buyeo Gye; Unknown; Wiryeseong
- Died: September 346 A.D. Wiryeseong
- Issue: Prince Min; Prince Mun; Princess Hwa
- House: Buyeo
- Dynasty: Baekje
- Father: Bunseo
- Occupation: King

- Gye of Baekje
- Hangul: 계왕
- Hanja: 契王
- RR: Gyewang
- MR: Kyewang

King Gye (died 346, r. 344–346) was the twelfth king of Baekje, one of the Three Kingdoms of Korea.

== Background ==
He was the eldest son of the 10th king Bunseo, who was assassinated in 304. The Samguk sagi records that "he was naturally hard and brace, and skilled with horse and bow. When Bunseo died, Gye was too young to succeed him, so Biryu (younger brother of the 7th king Saban) succeeded him, dying in the 41st year of his own reign. Then Gye succeeded him".

== Reign ==
His rule indicated the continued the rivalry between two royal lines, that of the 5th king Chogo and that of the 8th king Goi, from whom Gye descended. The Goi line ended with Gye's 2-year reign, as he was succeeded by Biryu's son Geunchogo.

Samguk sagi:

- 346 AD, autumn, ninth month. The king died.

== Family ==
- Father: Bunseo of Baekje
- Mother: unknown
  - Queen: unknown
    - Children: Buyeo Min
    - Buyeo Mun
    - Buyeo Hwa

== Popular culture ==
- Portrayed by Han Jin-hee in the 2010–2011 KBS1 TV series The King of Legend.

== See also ==
- List of monarchs of Korea
- History of Korea

Gye of Baekje House of Buyeo Cadet branch of the House of Go Died: 346
Regnal titles
Preceded by Biryu	King of Baekje; 344–346	Succeeded by Geunchogo
