= Mongchontoseong =

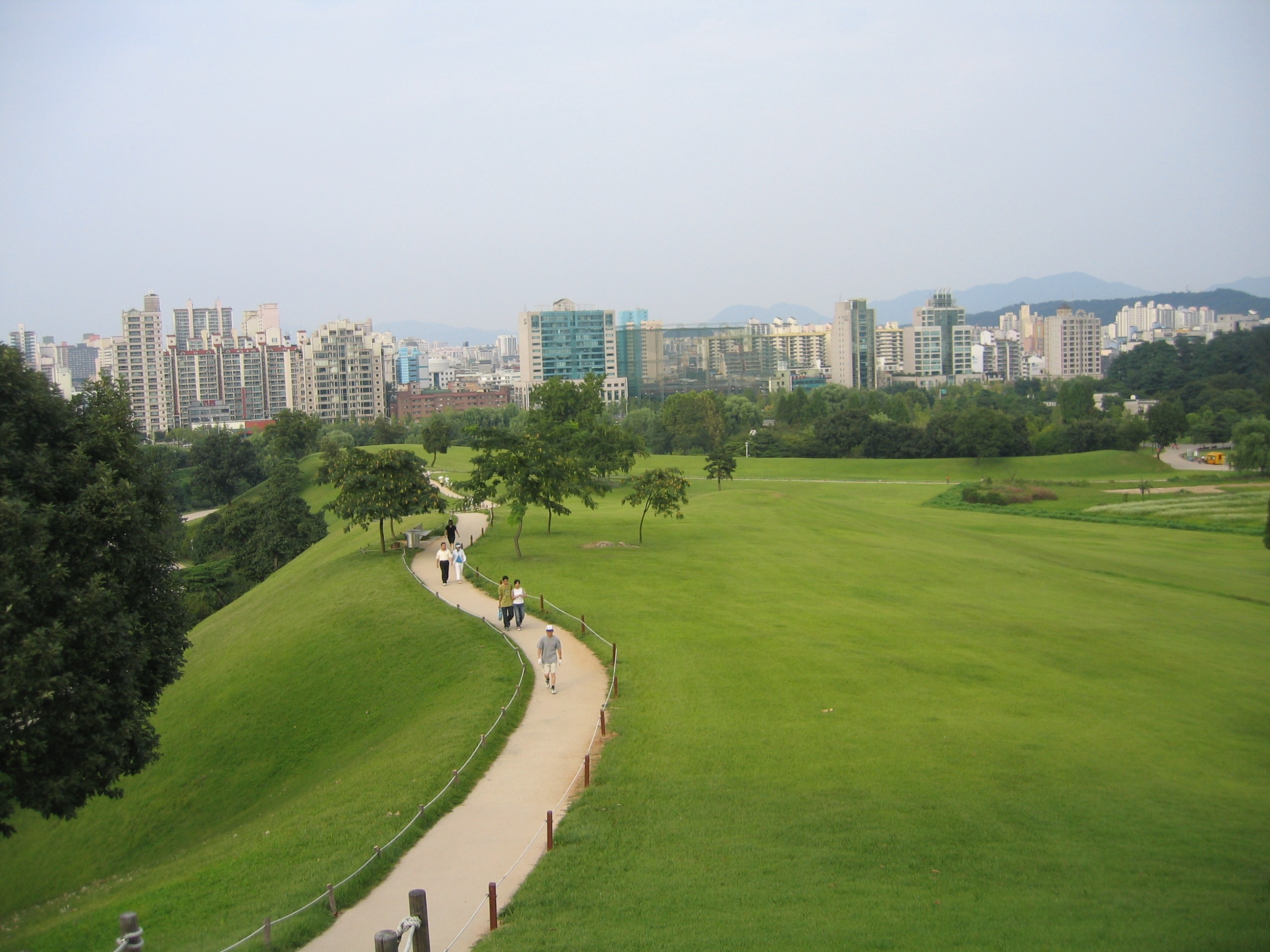
- The former site of Mongchontoseong (2011)
- Interactive map of Mongchontoseong
- 37°31′18″N 127°7′22″E
- Location: Seoul, South Korea

Historic Sites of South Korea
- Official name: Mongchontoseong Earthen Fortification, Seoul
- Designated: 1982-07-22
- Reference no.: 297

Korean name
- Hangul: 몽촌토성
- Hanja: 夢村土城
- RR: Mongchontoseong
- MR: Mongch'ont'osŏng

Mongchontoseong (Korean: 몽촌토성; Hanja: 夢村土城) is an ancient earthen rampart dating from the Baekje period. It is located what is now in the Olympic Park of Seoul, South Korea.

The fortification walls are estimated to have been about 2.7 km (1.7 mi) in length and approximately 6 to 7 m (20 to 23 ft) high. The fortifications of Mongch'ont'osŏng had a palisade atop the wall and a moat surrounding its base. They are part of Wiryeseong with Pungnaptoseong.

During the 1988 Summer Olympics, the running section of the modern pentathlon was held there. A number of important excavations of the site were conducted prior to the construction of the nearby Olympic Park.
