= Biryu of Baekje =

11th King of Baekje (r. 304–344)

Biryu 비류
- Eoraha

King of Baekje
- Reign: October 304 – October 344 A.D.
- Coronation: October 304 A.D.
- Predecessor: Bunseo
- Successor: Gye
- Born: Buyeo Biryu; Unknown
- Died: October 344 A.D.
- Consort: Lady Hae; Lady Jin
- Issue: Chan; Hwi; San; Go; Mong
- House: Buyeo
- Dynasty: Baekje
- Father: Gusu
- Occupation: King

- Biryu of Baekje
- Hangul: 비류왕
- Hanja: 比流王
- RR: Biryuwang
- MR: Piryuwang

King Biryu (died 344, r. 304–344) was the eleventh king of Baekje, one of the Three Kingdoms of Korea.

== Background ==
He was the second son of the 6th king King Gusu and the younger brother of the 7th king Saban. However, since this would make him rule until at least the age of 110, modern historians commonly assume that Biryu was in fact the son or grandson of Saban's younger brother. After the preceding king Bunseo was assassinated in the 7th year of his reign in 304 by Chinese agents, Biryu ascended to the throne because Bunseo's sons were deemed too young to rule. This appears to have been part of a power struggle between the two branches of the Baekje royal family, the descendants of the 5th king Chogo (Biryu's ancestor) and that of the 8th king Goi.

The Samguk sagi records that "his character was generous and benevolent, and he was powerful and skilled with a bow. For a long time, he resided among the people, and he was praised far and wide. After the death of Bunseo, all his children were too young to succeed. Therefore, at the recommendation of the ministers and people, he took the throne".

== Reign ==
In 312, he appointed Hae Gu to head the military. In 327, he stopped a rebellion by his half-brother Buyeo Ubok. In 337, he received a mission from the neighboring Silla.

Samguk sagi:

- 308 AD, spring, first month, first day of the year. There was a solar eclipse.
- 312 AD, spring, second month. The king sent ministers to make a tour and listen to the grievances of the people. The widowed and alone could not provide for themselves, and they were given three sok of grain. Summer, fourth month. The king visited Dongmyeong shrine. Bae Hae Gu was made Minister of the Military.
- 313 AD, spring, first month. Sacrifices were made to heaven and earth in south of the city. The king himself slew the animals.
- 316 AD, spring. There was a drought. A great star shot in the west. Summer, fourth month. The wells of the capital overflowed. A black dragon was seen inside of it.
- 320 AD, autumn, eighth month. A tower for shooting was made in the west of the palace. Every month on the first day of the month, he practiced shooting.
- 321 AD, spring, first month. The king's half-brother, Buyeo Ubok, was made Minister of the Interior. Autumn, seventh month. Venus was seen during the day. In the south of the country, locusts damaged the grain.
- 325 AD, winter, tenth month. There was a sound in heaven like the wind and the waves were smashing against each other. 11th month. The king went hunting north of Guwon and shot a deer.
- 327 AD, autumn, seventh month. There was a cloud like a red crow that came toward the sun. Ninth month. The Minister of the Interior, Buyeo Ubok, took control of the fortresses north of the Han River and rebelled. The king dispatched soldiers to attack him.
- 331 AD, In the spring and summer, there was a great drought. The grass and trees withered, and the rivers ran dry until autumn, when it rained in the seventh month. That year there was a famine, and there were incidents of cannibalism.
- 333 AD, summer, fifth month. A star fell. There was a fire in the king's palace. It spread to the houses of the people. Autumn, seventh month. They repaired the palace. Bae Jin Yi was made Minister of the Interior. Winter, 12th month. There was thunder.
- 335 AD, winter, first day of the month. There was a solar eclipse.
- 336 AD, spring, first month. On "辛巳", a comet was seen in Kui, one of the 28 lunar mansions.
- 337 AD, spring, second month. Silla dispatched messengers with gifts for the court.
- 344 AD, winter, tenth month. The king died.

== Legacy ==
He was father of the 13th king King Geunchogo who would become the most famous of all of the kingdom's monarchs bringing Baekje to its pinnacle of power.

Japanese historians suspect Biryu, like Saban, as the progenitor of certain aristocratic clans of Yamato period Japan. Any genealogical records either did not exist or have been lost/destroyed for over a millennium.

== Popular culture ==
- Portrayed by Yoon Seung-won in the 2010–2011 KBS1 TV series The King of Legend.

== Family ==
- Father: Gusu of Baekje, because of date discrepancies most scholars believe he is not a son but a descendant.
- Consorts and their respective issue(s):
1. Queen, of the Hae clan (解氏)
  1. Buyeo Chan
  2. Buyeo Hwi
  3. Buyeo San
2. Queen, of the Jin clan (眞氏)
  1. Buyeo Gu (扶餘句, 324–375) – 13th King of Baekje, Geunchogo of Baekje.
  2. Buyeo Mong
- Others:
  - Buyeo Sai (扶餘沙伊, ?–234) – first son, 7th King of Baekje, Saban of Baekje
  - Buyeo Ubok (扶餘優福, ?–?) – in 321 he was appointed Minister of the Interior (Naesin-jwa'pyeong, 內臣佐平) and in 327 he rebelled against his half-brother, the king.

== See also ==
- List of monarchs of Korea
- History of Korea

Biryu of Baekje House of Buyeo Cadet branch of the House of Go Died: 344
Regnal titles
Preceded by Bunseo	King of Baekje; 304–344	Succeeded by Gye
