= Byeokgolje ssangnyongnori =

Annual folk event in South Korea

Byeokgolje ssangnyongnori (Korean: 벽골제 쌍룡놀이; Hanja: 碧骨堤 雙龍놀이) is a major event of the Byeokgol Cultural Festival held annually in mid-October (September 9 on the lunar calendar). It is a folk game that takes place in Byeokgolje (a reservoir during the Baekje period) in Buryang-myeon, Gimje, South Korea. It is also held in honour of the spirit of Danyanangja, who became a sacrifice to protect the Byeokgolje festival in Yonggol Village, Yonggol-ri, Buryang-myeon, Gimje, Jeollabuk-do on September 9 of the lunar calendar.

Byeokgolje ssangnyongnori is said to have developed into a folk game of the present day by a fight between two dragons, Baengnyong and Cheongnyong and an event to comfort the soul of Danya, the daughter of Tae-soo Kim, who was sacrificed in the process. The story of the fight came to the later generations and became a game as they intertwined with the affectionate conflict of humans.

== Legend ==
According to legend, two dragons, one white, named Baengnyong, and one blue, Cheongnyong, lived near the Byeokgol Embankment. Baengnyong was gentle in nature and guarded the embankment, but Cheongnyong was violent, mischievous and often harmed people. In the end, it led to the two dragons' fight, which resulted in the bank collapsing due to the loss of Baengnyong. As a result, the villagers worked together to protect Byeokgolje, but in the process, Tae-soo's daughter Danya was sacrificed, and the event to comfort Danya's soul Byeokgolje Ssangnyong Nori developed into a folk game.

== Byeokgolje ==
Byeokgolje ssangnyongnori was formed on the basis of Byeokgolje, one of the oldest reservoirs in Korea. It is related to rice farming and dragon faith in the Kim Man (Gimje, Mangyeong) Plain (Jingge Maenggyeong Outfield Fields), which has the only horizon, and was dramatized based on the legend of Danya, which belongs to the legend of the human god. It is the core performing art of the Horizon Festival.

In the history and culture of Byeokgolje, ssangnyongnori was formed and passed down. Byeokgolje is a symbol of the rice farming culture in Gimje, and testifies to the history of exploitation and opportunity that changed from Mahan to Baekje and then to Silla. In the Gimje region, a province with rice farming developed from around the 5th century BC, and in the Mahan period there was a country called Byeokbiriguk (辟卑離國). However, as Baekje pursued the Mahan annexation policy, Gimje was incorporated into Baekje's market and took on the role of a logistical base for the South Jinan gang of Baekje. Byeokgolje was built in 330 (the 27th year of King Biryu), and together with the Hwangdeungje Hwang Dynasty and the Gobunulje 高阜訥堤, it formed the golden belt of artificial irrigation facilities for rice cultivation. However, after Silla's annexation of Baekje, the area became Wansan District, and the centre of military administration moved from Gobu to Jeonju. As a result, the name of Byeokgolje was changed to Gimje, and became Gimje-gun under the jurisdiction of Jeonju. In addition, renovation work was carried out in 790 (6th King Wonseong in Silla), 1143 (21st Goryeo Injured), and 1415 (15th Taejong of Joseon).

The structure of Byeokgolje was five ditches. From the north to the south, it was in the order of 水餘渠 ─ Jangsaenggeo 長生渠 ─ Central 心渠 ─ Gyeongjanggeo 經藏渠 ─ Distribution 流通渠. Standing room only bar bridge groups tales for including folk beliefs and legends, such as West Wing are both with regard to rice cultivation in the province of Gimje reservoir embankment indicates the fact that the construction and worshipped the spirits of the water yongsin. The legend of Danya is related to the repair work in the days of King Wonseong. Therefore, the historical and folklore origin of Ssangryong nori, established on the basis of the Danya legend, has a deep history of play that dates back to the Silla period.

== Significance ==
This was a folklore of local shrines that occurred in the early days of rice paddy farming, and targeted 'dragons' related to water irrigation. Beings that perform heroic acts of removing evil spirits are animals such as toads or are seen in heroic stories. It shows the characteristics of a passive pottery culture in that the evil spirit was concealed by the sacrificial act of a mortal woman rather than a forceful opposition.

In addition, as human wisdom develops, it can be interpreted in a form in which the complex loyalty, filial piety, and heat appearing in Shimcheongjeon, Chunhyangjeon are refracted and accepted.

It was designated as a North Jeolla Province folk data in 1975, and in September 1975, it was awarded the Minister of Culture, Sports and Tourism Award (now the Minister of Culture and Tourism), the most prestigious prize in the folk play category at the 16th National Folk Art Contest.

== Present-day ==
At the Byeokgol Cultural Festival of the annual Gimje Horizon Festival, it is dramatized as Ssangryong Nori unfolding a folk play.

Byeokgolje Ssangryong Nori has a very strong legendary element and is thought to be a local shrine that occurred in the early days of the rice field farming era. Survival irrigation has occurred since the Three Kingdoms period, and Byeokgolje, located in the middle of the Honam Plain, the largest in the country, was particularly important. It is also held every year as a major event of the Byeokgol Cultural Festival, receiving the best prize, the Minister of Education, Culture and Sports Award at the 16th National Folklore Contest held in September 1975. It was designated as Folk Cultural Property No. 10 on April 2, 1976, and the transferee was Gimje High School.
