= Chaekgye of Baekje =

9th King of Baekje (r. 286–298)

Chaekgye 책계
- Eoraha

King of Baekje
- Reign: 286 – 298 A.D.
- Coronation: 286 A.D.
- Predecessor: Goi
- Successor: Bunseo
- Born: Buyeo Chaekgye; Unknown; Wiryeseong
- Died: 298 A.D. Wiryeseong
- Consort: Lady Bogwa
- Issue: Buyeo Bunseo
Regnal name
- Cheonggye Eoraha; Chaegchan Eoraha
- House: Buyeo
- Dynasty: Baekje
- Father: Goi
- Mother: Lady Bogwa
- Occupation: King

- Chaekgye of Baekje
- Hangul: 책계왕
- Hanja: 責稽王
- RR: Chaekgyewang
- MR: Ch'aekkyewang

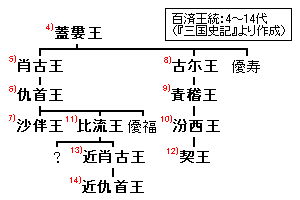
Genealogy of the king, helpful for understanding the dynasty.

King Chaekgye (died 298, r. 286–298) was the ninth king of Baekje, one of the Three Kingdoms of Korea.

== Background ==
He was the eldest son of King Goi. He became king upon Goi's death in 286 which was the 53rd year of his reign. The Samguk sagi records that "his stature was tall and great, and he was spirited and heroic".

== Reign ==
His wife, whose name is recorded as Bogwa (보과; 寶菓), was a daughter of the governor of Daifang commandery. This marital alliance contributed to friction between the northern Korean kingdom Goguryeo and Baekje, after Goguryeo attacked Daifang in 286 and Chaekgye sent troops to Daifang's aid. Chaekgye fortified the Wiryeseong, Acha Mountain Fortress and Sa-seong to defend the Han River valley against expected retaliation.

In 298, Baekje was invaded by Maek-in (맥인, 貊人, probably referring to Dongye) and the Lelang commandery, and Chaekgye was killed.

Samguk sagi: "The King conscribed adult males to repair the fortress of Wirye. Goguryeo attacked Daifang. Daifang sought help from us. Previously, the king had married the daughter of the Daifang, Bogwa, and made her his concubine. Therefore he said, "Daifang is the country of my relatives, how can I not hearken this summons?" Then he led a force out to rescue them. Goguryeo resented this, and the king feared a reprisal attack, and so had the fortresses of Acha and Saseong repaired and provisioned."

- 287 AD, spring, first month. The king visited Dongmyeong shrine.
- 298 AD, autumn, ninth month. People from Han and Yemaek invaded. The king led a force to defend, and his enemies killed him.

== Family ==
- Father: Goi of Baekje
- Mother: daughter of the Governor of Daifang commandery.
  - Queen: Lady Bogwa (보과부인; 寶菓夫人) – daughter of the Governor of Daifang commandery.
    - Son: Buyeo Bunseo (扶餘汾西, ?–304) – 10th King of Baekje, Bunseo of Baekje.

== See also ==
- History of Korea

Chaekgye of Baekje House of Buyeo Cadet branch of the House of Go Died: 298
Regnal titles
Preceded by Goi	King of Baekje; 286–298	Succeeded by Bunseo
