= Buyeo Ubok =

4th century Korean Baekje royal prince

- Hangul: 부여우복
- Hanja: 扶餘優福
- RR: Buyeo Ubok
- MR: Puyŏ Ubok

Buyeo Ubok (扶餘優福, ? – ?) a member of the royal family of Baekje, one of the Three Kingdoms of Korea. He was a son of descendant of the 6th king, Gusu of Baekje.

The Samguk Sagi records:

In 321 he was appointed Minister of the Interior (Naeshinjoapyung, 內臣佐平).

In 327 he started a rebellion against his "half-brother" Biryu and took control of the fortresses north of the Han River. The king dispatched soldiers to attack him and the rebellion was stopped.

== Family ==
- Father: Gusu of Baekje - this is controversial but he is at least a descendant of Gusu.
- Mother: unknown
  - Brother: Buyeo Sai (扶餘沙伊, ?–234) - first son, 7th King of Baekje, Saban of Baekje.
  - Brother: Buyeo Biryu (扶餘比流, ?–344) - 11th King of Baekje, Biryu of Baekje; recorded as son of Gusu in the Samguk Sagi but because of date discrepancies scholars now believe he was a grandson of Gusu.
  - Wife: unknown
    - Children: unknown

== See also ==
- History of Korea
- Three Kingdoms of Korea
