= Gwalleuk =

Korean Buddhist monk from Baekje

- Hangul: 관륵
- Hanja: 觀勒
- Revised Romanization: Gwalleuk
- McCune–Reischauer: Kwallŭk

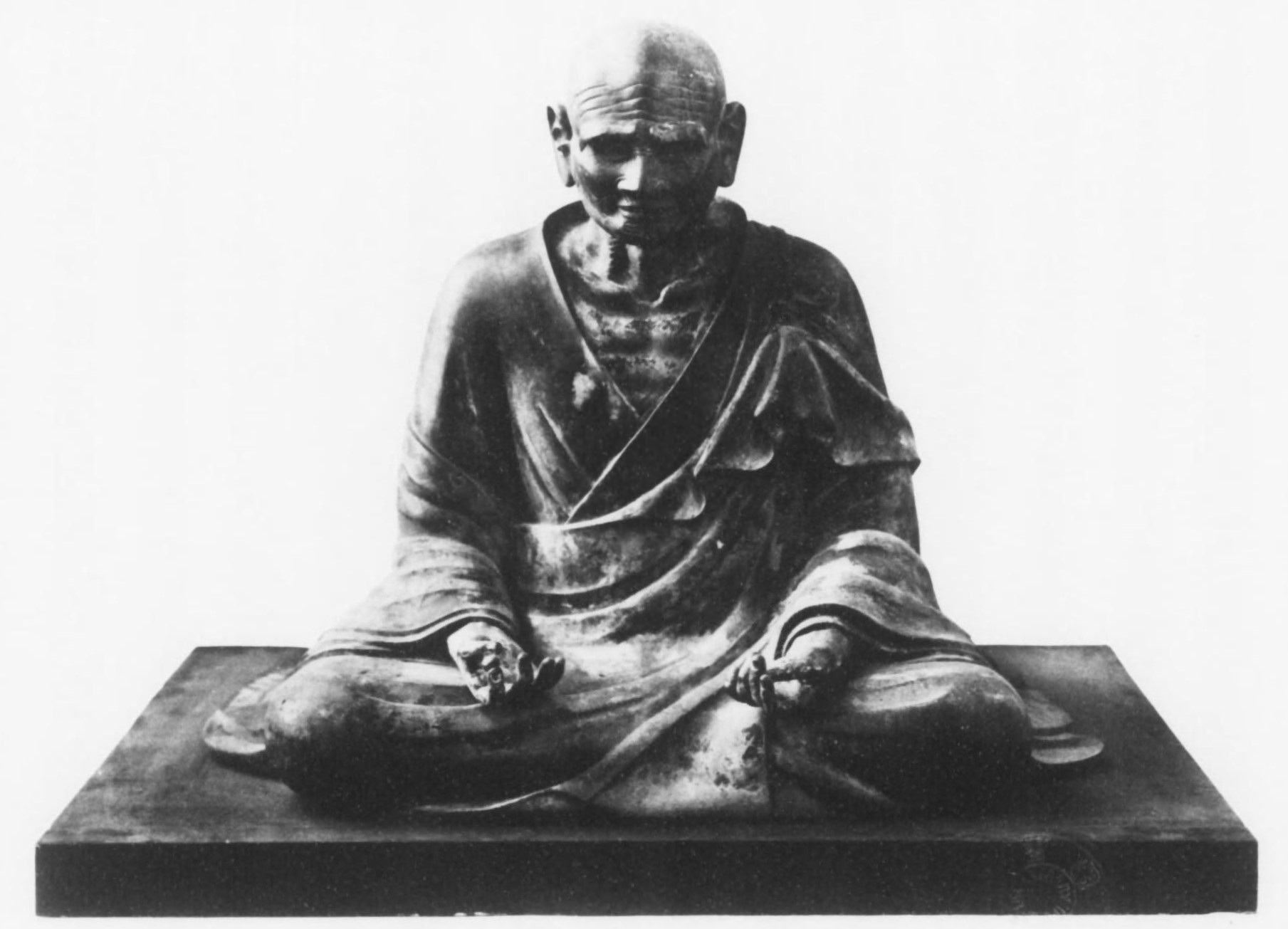

Gwalleuk was a Korean Buddhist monk from the kingdom of Baekje who lived during the time of King Wideok. In 602, he travelled to Japan and is known for helping to spread the teachings of Taoism and Buddhism to Japan. In particular, he brought over fangshu texts related to the likes of geomancy and onmyōdō (yinyang-based sorcery and divination), as well as a calendar, according to the Nihon Shoki. In 624, he was made a high priest (僧正 sōjō), possibly of Gangō-ji, for the rest of his life.

He is mentioned several times in Buddhist records in Japan, where he was known as Kanroku, the Japanese reading of his name.

== Asteroid ==
The asteroid 4963 Kanroku discovered on 18 February 1977 by Hiroki Kosai and Kiichirō Furukawa of the Tokyo Astronomical Observatory was named after him.

== See also ==
- List of Baekje-related topics
- Korean Buddhism
- Three Kingdoms of Korea
