= Ko Hung =

Ko Hung may represent the romanization of:

- Ge Hong (283–343), Chinese Taoist philosopher and alchemist of the fourth century
- Go Heung, historian of the ancient Korean kingdom of Baekje
