= Baekje Cultural Land =

Historical theme park in Buyeo, South Korea

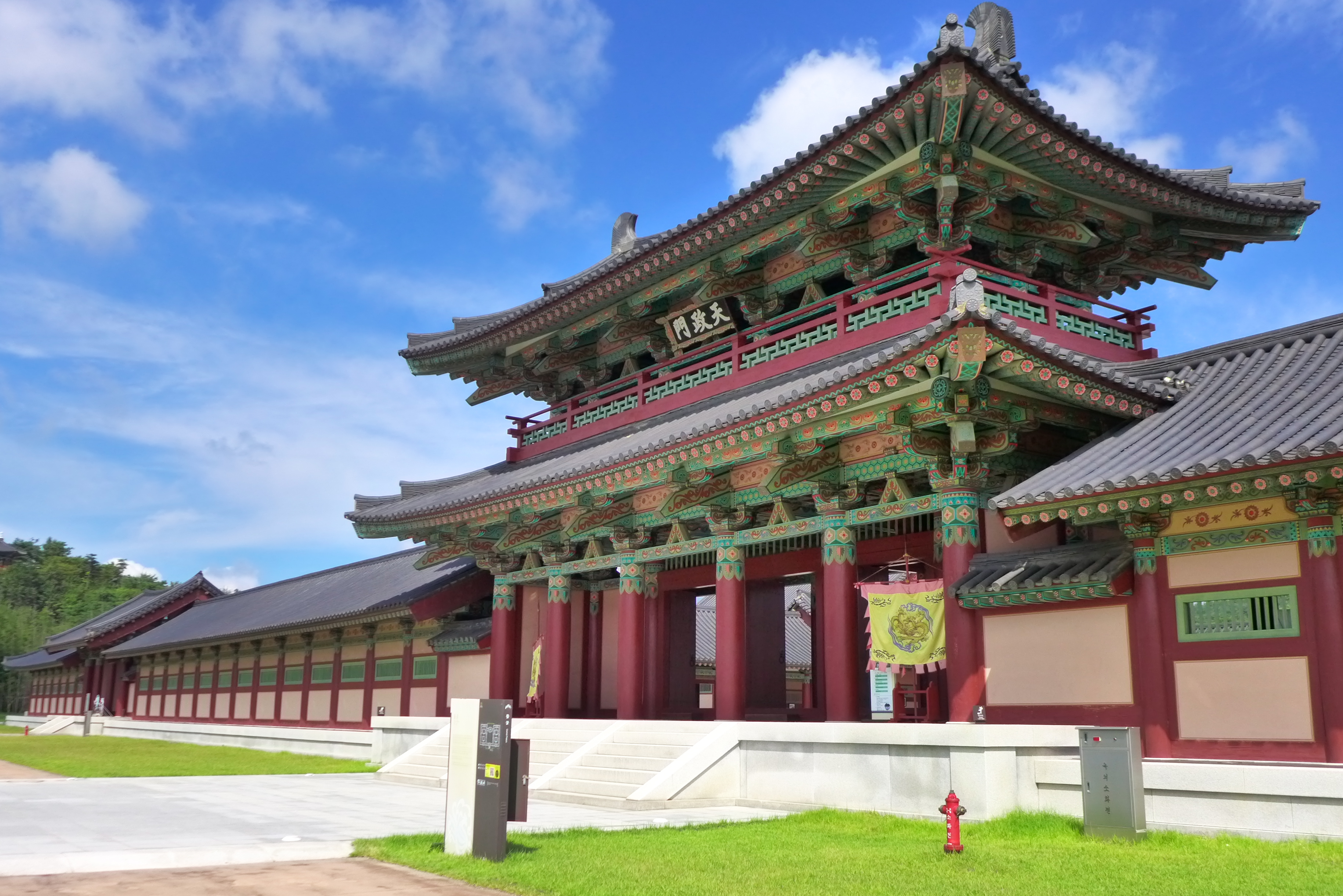
- Interactive map of Baekje Cultural Land
- Coordinates: 36.3069°N 126.9066°E
- Opened: October 18, 2010
- Theme: Baekje historical period
- Area: 3,305,785 m^{2}

Korean name
- Hangul: 백제문화단지
- Hanja: 百濟文化團地
- RR: Baekje munhwa danji
- MR: Paekche munhwa tanji

Baekje Cultural Land (Korean: 백제문화단지) is a Korean historical theme park located in Buyeo County in South Chungcheong province, South Korea. It is the largest historical theme park in the country, built to preserve the history and culture of the Baekje kingdom (18 BC – 660 AD). The theme park is one of the locations of the annual Baekje Cultural Festival. The location has been used for filming sageuk films and television series, for example Moon Lovers: Scarlet Heart Ryeo was partially shot here, as well as an episode of Running Man.

== History and attractions ==
The Baekje Cultural Land project commenced in 1994 and the groundbreaking ceremony was done in 1998. The Baekje Historical Museum opened first in 2006, and the theme park opened to visitors in 2010.

During construction, historically important buildings were rebuilt as replicas of the original, including Neungsa (능사), one of the most important Buddhist temples of the period, and Sabi Palace. The theme park features a "living village", consisting of noblemen's, middle class and lower class model houses, with a replica of general Gyebaek's home. A replica of how the first Baekje capital, Wiryeseong might have looked like was also included in the theme park. Besides featuring palaces, houses, and other functional buildings, the park showcases noblemen's tombs of the Sabi period, which were moved from their original locations in Buyeo County to the park.

The park holds a permanent performance, "The Birth of Chiljido" twice every day.
