= Geunchogo of Baekje =

13th King of Baekje (r. 346–375)

Geunchogo 근초고
- Eoraha
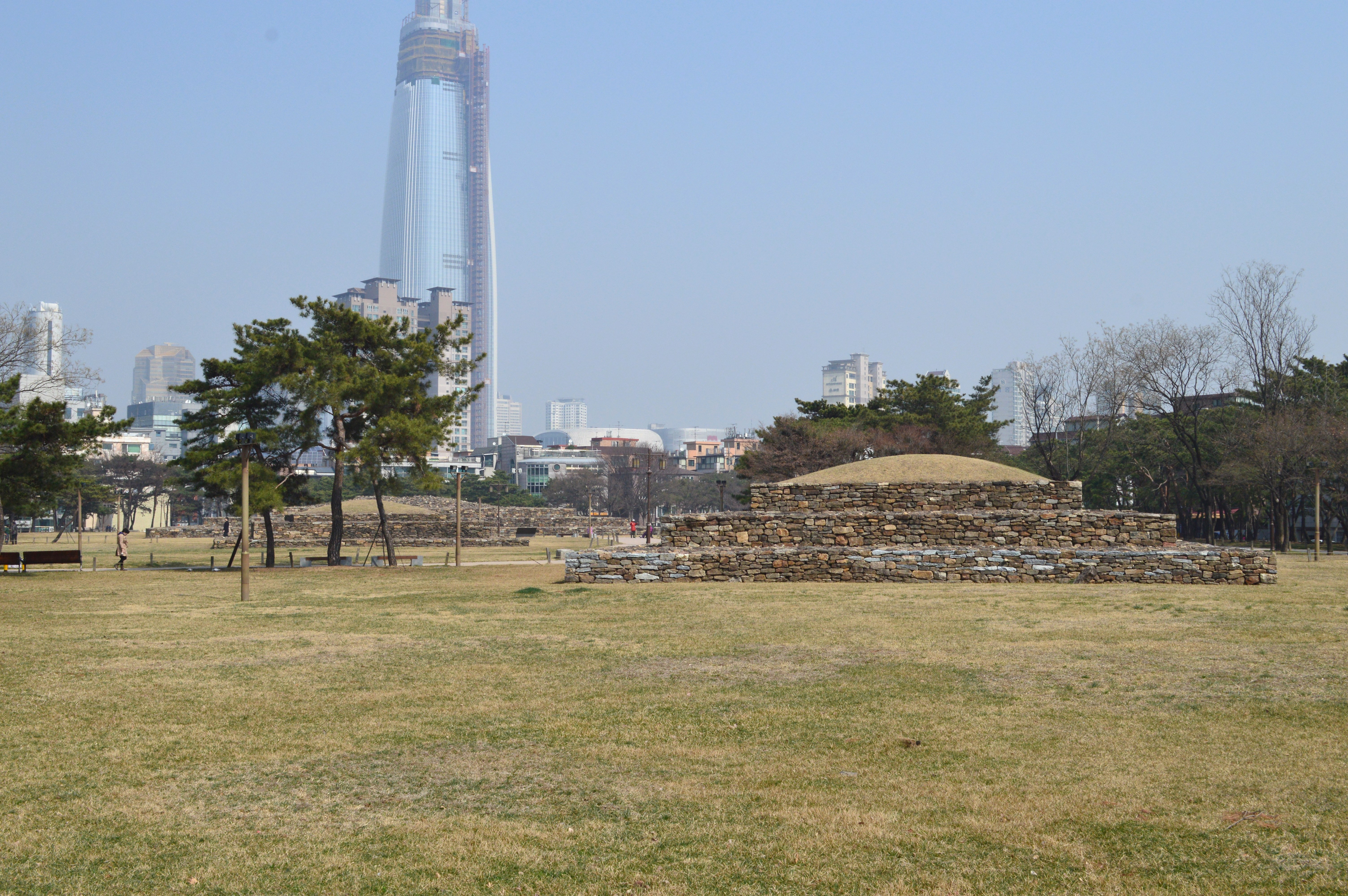
- Tomb No. 3 Seokjong-dong; Possible tomb of King Geunchogo

King of Baekje
- Reign: 346 – 375 A.D.
- Predecessor: Gye
- Successor: Geungusu
- Born: Buyeo Go; 324 A.D. Wiryeseong
- Died: 375 A.D. Wiryeseong
- Spouse: Wi Heungran; Buyeo Hwa
- Issue: Geun; Su
- House: Buyeo
- Dynasty: Baekje
- Father: Biryu
- Mother: Lady Jin
- Occupation: King

- Geunchogo of Baekje
- Hangul: 근초고왕
- Hanja: 近肖古王
- RR: Geunchogowang
- MR: Kŭnch'ogowang

King Geunchogo, Chogo II (324–375, r. 346–375) was the 13th king of Baekje, one of the Three Kingdoms of Korea. He is claimed as the King reigned over the apex of Baekje's powers.

== Background ==
Geunchogo was the fourth son of the 11th king Biryu and became king upon the death of the 12th king Gye. His reign seems to have marked the permanent ascendancy of the descendants of the 5th king Chogo (reflected in Geunchogo's name) over those of the 8th king Goi, and ended the alternating kingship of the two lines.

== Strengthening royal power ==
Upon ascending the throne, he set out to solidify the royal power within the Baekje state. He reduced the power of the aristocracy and set up a system of local government with regional heads appointed by the court. He married a wife from the Jin clan, setting a precedent for his successors, and he moved the capital to Hansan, today's southeast Seoul.

== Territorial expansion ==
Under Geunchogo, the kingdom reached its greatest geographic extent and political power. The remaining tribes of Mahan were annexed in 369, completing Baekje's control over all of present-day Jeolla Province. Gaya confederacy states west of the Nakdong River were also made Baekje dependencies.

In 369, Baekje was invaded by Goguryeo, but counterattacked in force at the Battle of Chiyang. In 371, the Baekje army of 30,000, led by Crown Prince Geungusu, took the fortress of Pyongyang and killed Gogugwon of Goguryeo.

At the end of these conquests, Baekje ringed the Yellow Sea, and controlled much of the Korean Peninsula, including all of Gyeonggi Province, Chungcheong, and Jeolla Province and parts of Gangwon and Hwanghae Provinces.

== Foreign relations ==
In 366, Geunchogo allied with Silla, which bordered Baekje on the east, maintaining a rough balance of power among the Three Kingdoms.

At its greatest extent, Baekje control reached north into what is now China. The kingdom also established diplomatic relations with the early Jin China in 345 and Japan in 367. According to both Korean and Chinese sources, the first diplomatic contact between Baekje and China took place in 372, when Geunchogo sent a mission to the court of Jin. In the same year, the Jin court sent a mission granting him the title of the "General Stabilizing the East and the Administrator-General of Lelang" (진동장군 영낙랑태수; 鎭東將軍領樂浪太守).

During his reign, Baekje activated and led the commercial trading among China, Korean Peninsula and Japan; known as the triangle trade. Traditionally the commerce was mostly dominated by Chinese emperors; however, after China lost control of Lelang, northern China came under the rule of the "Five Barbarians", all of whom were inexperienced at sea. Baekje established commanderies in the Liaoxi regions of China and advanced into Kyūshū of Japan, and rose as the new trading center of East Asia.

Baekje also exported culture to Baekje's allies in the Wa kingdom of Yamato period Japan. The evidence of friendly relationship of Baekje with Japan is the Seven-Branched Sword which Geunchogo gave to the Yamato ruler. According to Nihon Shoki, Geunchogo also sent scholars Wang In and Ajiki to Japan to spread knowledge of Baekje culture: Confucianism and Chinese characters. Then Wani taught Confucian classics to emperor's heir Ujinowakiiratuko.

== Seogi ==
During his reign a history of Baekje titled Seogi (서기; 書記) was compiled by the scholar Go Heung (고흥; 高興). Its purpose was not only to record history, but also to justify his rule and to display the power of Baekje. No known copy of Seogi has survived to the modern era.

== Samguk sagi ==
"King Geunchogo was the fourth son of king Biryu. His body and countenance were unusually robust, and he possessed far-reaching knowledge. When King Gye died, he succeeded him."

- 347 AD, spring, first month. Sacrifices were made for gods of heaven and earth. Bae Jin Jeong was made Minister of the Court: he was the queen's relative. His character was vicious and perverse, and he was not benevolent. He turned himself toward petty matters, and he relied on force to make his case. The people hated him.
- 366 AD, spring, third month. Messengers were dispatched to present gifts to Silla.
- 368 AD, spring, third month, first day of the month. There was a solar eclipse. Messengers were dispatched to Silla, sent with two good horses.
- 369 AD, autumn, ninth month. King Sayu of Goguryeo, at the head of 20,000 men on foot and horse, came to the village of Chiyang, and divided his forces to attack and sack the houses of the people. The king dispatched the crown prince with soldiers directly to Chiyang, and they quickly attacked and defeated them. They captured more than 5,000, and these prisoners were presented as gifts to the general and his warriors. Winter, 11th month. A great examination was made [of the troops] in the area south of the Han river. The flags used were all yellow.
- 371 AD, Goguryeo raised soldiers and came. The king heard this, and his men hid in the ditches and canals. Then they suddenly rushed out and attacked them. The soldiers of Goguryeo were defeated. Winter. The king and the crown prince led 30,000 spirited troops to attack Goguryeo at the fortress of Pyongyang. The King of Goguryeo, Sayu, fought powerfully to repel them, but was hit by a stray arrow and died. Our king led his men to retreat, and we moved our capital to Mt. Hansan.
- 372 AD, spring, first month. Messengers were dispatched to the Jin court with tribute. Autumn, seventh month. There was an earthquake.
- 373 AD, spring, second month. Messengers were dispatched to the Jin court with tribute. Autumn, seventh month. A fortress was built at Mt. Cheongmok. The master of Doksan Fortress led 300 men and fled to Silla.
- 375 AD, autumn, seventh month. Goguryeo came and attacked the northern lowlands at the fortress of Sugok, and took it. The king dispatched men to repel the invasion, but they were not successful. The king also had a general raise a large army to revenge themselves, but that year there was a drought and so the plan did not succeed. Winter, 11th month. The king died. The Goki [Record of Ancient Matters] says, when Baekje was founded, they did not keep written records. However, in this period they go the services of the scholar Go Heung, and he first began writing history. However, Go Heung is not made clear in any other records, and so it is not known who he was.

== Family ==
- Father: Biryu of Baekje
- Mother: Queen, of the Jin clan (眞氏)
  - Queen: Queen, of the Jin clan (眞氏)
    - Son: Buyeo Gusu (扶餘須, ? – 384) – 14th King of Baekje, Geungusu of Baekje.
    - Son: Buyeo Geun
    - Daughter: Buyeo Jin

== Popular culture ==
- Portrayed by Kam Woo-sung in the 2010–2011 KBS1 TV series The King of Legend.
- Portrayed by Jung Seung Kyo in the 2017 KBS TV series Chronicles of Korea.

== See also ==
- List of monarchs of Korea
- History of Korea

Geunchogo of Baekje House of Buyeo Cadet branch of the House of Go Died: 375
Regnal titles
Preceded by Gye	King of Baekje; 346–375	Succeeded by Geungusu
