= Saban of Baekje =

7th King of Baekje (r. 234)

Saban 사반
- Eoraha

King of Baekje
- Reign: 234 – 234 A.D. (2 months)
- Coronation: 234 A.D.
- Predecessor: Gusu
- Successor: Goi
- Regent: Buyeo Goi
- Born: Buyeo Saban; Unknown; Wiryeseong
- Died: 234 A.D. Wiryeseong
- Spouse: Unknown
- Issue: Unknown
Regnal name
- Saban Eoraha; Sabi Eoraha; Sai Eoraha
- House: Buyeo
- Dynasty: Baekje
- Father: Gusu
- Occupation: King

- Saban of Baekje
- Hangul: 사반왕; 사비왕; 사이왕
- Hanja: 沙伴王; 沙沸王; 沙伊王
- RR: Sabanwang; Sabiwang; Saiwang
- MR: Sabanwang; Sabiwang; Saiwang

King Saban (?–?, r. 234) was the seventh king of Baekje, one of the Three Kingdoms of Korea.

== Background ==
He was the eldest son of Gusu, the previous king. He became king upon Gusu's death in 234 which was the 21st year of his reign.

The only record of Saban in the Samguk sagi is that Saban was found too young to rule and was quickly succeeded by King Goi, the younger brother of the 5th king Chogo.

"King Gusu died in the 21st year of his reign. His eldest son, Saban, succeeded him. However, he was too young and could not manage the government. King Chogo's younger brother, who had the same mother, became king."

This is interpreted by scholars as a power struggle within the court, and the rise of the Jin clan over the Hae clan; the Samguk yusa says that he was deposed.

Nothing is known of the birth, later life, or death of Saban. However, he is recorded in some Japanese chronicles, including Shinsen Shōjiroku, as the progenitor of certain clans of Yamato period Japan. This may indicate that he spent the later part of his life in that country.

== Family ==
- Father: Gusu of Baekje
- Mother: unknown
  - Brother: 11th King, Biryu of Baekje (比流王, ?–344) – before he was king he was known as Buyeo Biryu (扶餘比流); recorded as son of Gusu in the Samguk sagi but because of date discrepancies scholars now believe he was a grandson of Gusu.
  - Brother: Buyeo Ubok (扶餘優福, ?–?) – in 321 he was appointed Minister of the Interior (Naeshinjoapyung, 內臣佐平) and in 327 he helped put down a rebellion.
  - Queen(s): unknown
    - Children: unknown, but Saban is listed as progenitor of several Japanese clans.

== See also ==
- History of Korea

Saban of Baekje House of Buyeo Cadet branch of the House of Go
Regnal titles
Preceded by Gusu	King of Baekje; 234	Succeeded by Goi
