= Gusu of Baekje =

6th King of Baekje (r. 214–234)

- Hangul: 구수왕; 귀수왕
- Hanja: 仇首王; 貴須王
- RR: Gusuwang; Gwisuwang
- MR: Kusuwang; Kwisuwang

Gusu (died 234, r. 214–234) was the sixth king of Baekje, one of the Three Kingdoms of Korea.

== Background ==
He was the eldest son of the 5th king Chogo. He became king upon Chogo's death in 214 which was the 49th year of his reign. The Samguk sagi records that "he was seven feet tall and unusually exceptional in his power".

== Reign ==
Even assuming that the dates given in the Samguk sagi are accurate, Baekje through Gusu's reign was probably a confederacy, not yet a kingdom.

In 216, he prevailed against the Mohe forces at Sado Castle, and in 222, he destroyed a 5,000-strong force of Silla, the rival Korean kingdom. However, the Samguk sagi records many Baekje defeats against the Mohe and Silla, as well as natural disasters towards the end of Gusu's reign.

Samguk sagi:

- 216 AD, autumn, eighth month. The Mohe came and surrounded Jeokhyeon Fortress. The lord of the fortress repelled them, and the bandits retreated. The King led 800 choice cavalry in pursuit of them, and fought them near Sado Fortress, and broke them. Many of them were killed or captured.
- 217 AD, spring, second month. Twin palisades were constructed alongside Sado Fortress, and from east to west they ran in parallel for 10 ri. The people of Jeokhyeon were divided and some made to defend the palisade.
- 218 AD, the king led soldiers to surround Jangsan Fortress of Silla. The king of Silla (Naehae of Silla) himself led and army out to attack them, and the Baekje army was defeated.
- 221 AD, summer, fifth month. In the east of the country there was great rainfall, and the mountains collapsed in more than 40 places. Sixth month, last day of the month. There was a solar eclipse. Autumn, eighth month. There was a great examination of the area to the west of the Han River.
- 222 AD, spring, second month. Commissioners were ordered to repair the dikes and embankments. Third month. The king made a proclamation encouraging production of agriculture. Summer, sixth month. It rained fish in the capital. Winter, tenth month. Soldiers were dispatched to Udujin in Silla, and the inhabitants were robbed and kidnapped. The Sillan general Chunghwon led 5,000 soldiers to counter-attack, and at Ungok Fortress they made a great rout of the Baekje forces. Only the cavalry escaped. 11th month, last day of the month, there was a solar eclipse.
- 224 AD, autumn, seventh month. The Sillan Ilgil XYeonchin came and invaded. Our army counter-attacked near Mt. Bongsan but could not overcome them. Winter, tenth month. Venus was seen.
- 227 AD, spring, third month. It hailed. Summer, fourth month. There was a great drought. The king prayed in the eastern court of Jumong, and it rained.
- 229 AD, winter, tenth month. The king hunted at a cold spring. 11th month. There was a great pestilence. The Mohe came to the borders of Ugok Fortress and kidnapped the people there. The King led 300 spirited soldiers to repel them. The bandits hid themselves, then came to attack, the Baekje army suffered a great defeat.
- 231 AD, summer, fourth month. There was hail the size of chestnuts. Some of the birds that were struck died.
- 234 AD, the king died.

== Legacy ==
Upon Gusu's death, his eldest son Saban briefly became the 7th king. Saban was dethroned by Goi, reported as Chogo's brother in the Samguk sagi, but believed to be of a rival royal line by modern scholars. Indicating continuing rivalry between the two lines, Gusu's second son became the 11th king Biryu, and the name of the 14th king Geungusu indicates descent from the Gusu line.

== Family ==
- Father: Chogo of Baekje
- Mother: unknown
  - Queen(s): unknown
    - 1st son: 7th King, Saban of Baekje (沙泮王, ?–234) – before he was king he was known as Buyeo Sai (扶餘沙伊).
      - Descendant: 11th King, Biryu of Baekje (比流王, ?–344) – before he was king he was known as Buyeo Biryu (扶餘比流); recorded as son of Gusu in the Samguk sagi but because of date discrepancies scholars now believe he was a grandson of Gusu.
      - Descendant: Buyeo Ubok (扶餘優福, ?–?) – in 321 he was appointed Minister of the Interior (Naeshinjoapyung, 內臣佐平) and in 327 he started a rebellion against his brother Biryu but it was stopped.

== See also ==
- List of monarchs of Korea
- History of Korea
- Three Kingdoms of Korea

Gusu of Baekje House of Buyeo Cadet branch of the House of Go Died: 234
Regnal titles
Preceded by Chogo	King of Baekje; 214–234	Succeeded by Saban
