= Gilt-bronze Incense Burner of Baekje =

South Korean national treasure

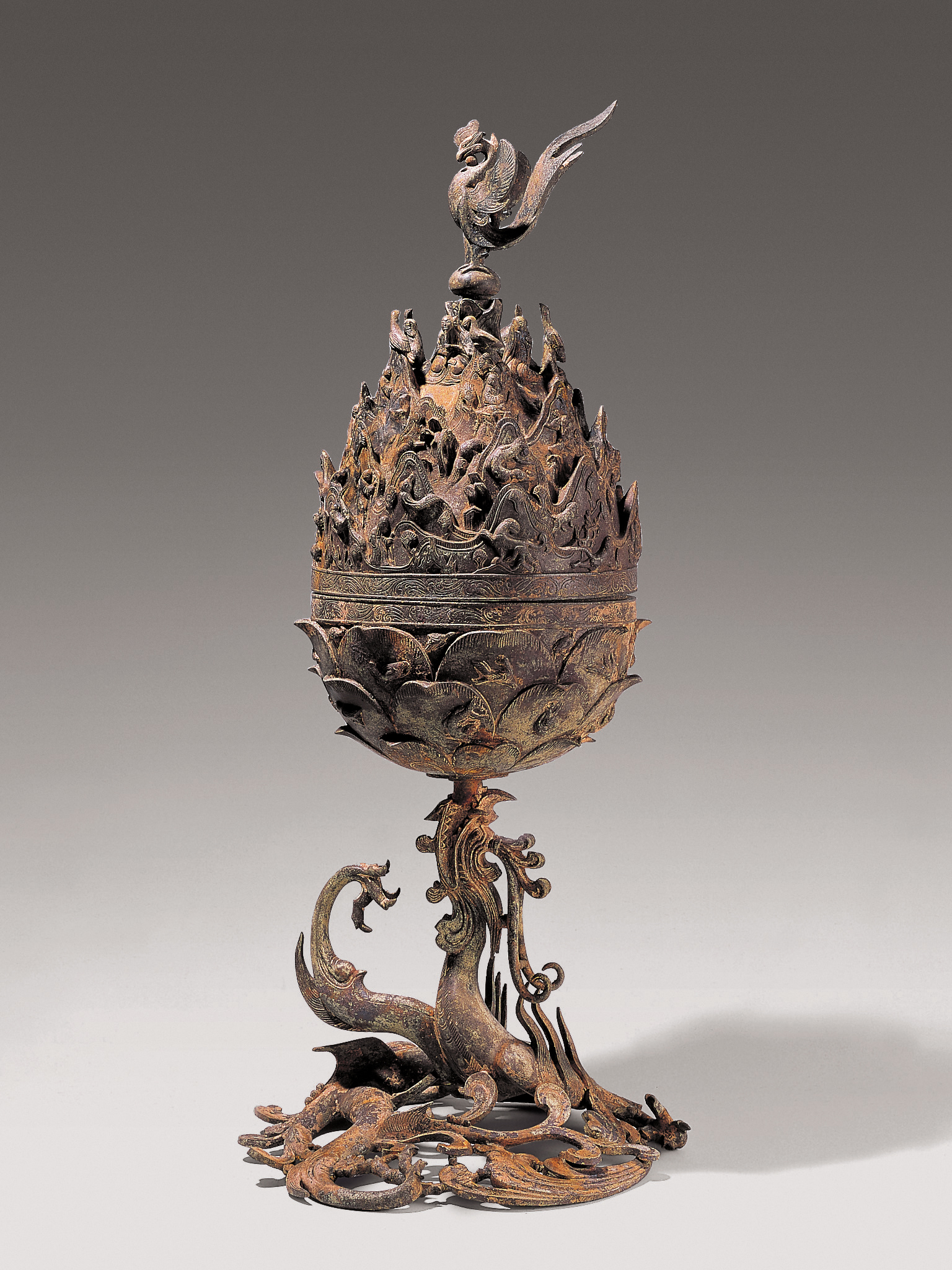

Korean name
- Hangul: 부여 능산리 출토 백제 금동 대향로
- Hanja: 扶餘陵山里出土百濟金銅大香爐
- RR: Buyeo Neungsan-ri chulto Baekje geumdong daehyangno
- MR: Puyŏ Nŭngsan-ri ch'ult'o Paekche kŭmdong taehyangno

The Gilt-bronze Incense Burner of Baekje was designated as the 287th National Treasure of Korea on May 30, 1996. Currently housed at the Buyeo National Museum, it was originally excavated at an ancient temple site in Neungsan-ri, Buyeo County in South Chungcheong Province in 1993. The incense burner was the largest find among the 450 artifacts excavated.

The Gilt-bronze Incense Burner of Baekje is a symbol of the artistry of the Baekje people and a masterpiece of Korean art.

The incense burner measures 64 centimeters in height, the body is 19 centimeters in diameter, and weighs 11.8 kilograms. It was probably made in the 6th century.

== History ==
"One of the crowning excavation achievements in the past century, the Baekje Gilt-Bronze Incense Burner, gave a critical turning point to the studies in the Baekje dynasty history. The Burner embraces the mind of the Baekje people who delicately chased their ideal world with exquisite techniques and keen appreciation. The Incense Burner of this kind has not been found anywhere in the world since then. It is no wonder that it can be really called a masterpiece", according to the Culture and Tourism website published by Chungcheongnam-do.

It had been widely believed the Baekje incense burner might have been copied from the Baksan (Korean: 박산 향로; Hanja: 博山香爐) burners of Han dynasty until recently when a Korean research team comprising historians and archaeologists made a great discovery that it differed from the ancient Chinese prototypes in its structure and designs, particularly in view of its five musicians in relief, which did not constitute the ornamental design element of the Han dynasty incense burners. In addition, one musical instrument in relief gave another clue to the study. The musical instrument called 'Wanham' (완함; 阮咸) was first introduced to the Tang dynasty in the 7th century after the Baekje kingdom disappeared into oblivion. The musical instrument came to be widely popular later in the 8th century, during the Tang dynasty, according to the New Book of Tang, which also showed the name of the instrument 'Wanham', named eponymically after a then-prominent artist of the Tang period about a century later than when the Baekje incense burner was made. The 'Wanham' originated from Kucha, where in the Kizil Caves the earliest form of this musical instrument can still be seen.

The Baekje burner uses realism and is three-dimensional. The incense burner incorporates Buddhist and Taoist themes but some theorize that the burner symbolizes themes of Northeast Asian culture. The dragon and phoenix suggest a yin and yang motif, and because it was excavated from what was probably a Buddhist temple, this theory has some weight. However, the uniqueness of the artifact suggests that the burner may have been used for ancestral rites or other unique ceremonies.

But in her paper "A Re-examination of the Top of Baekje Incense Burner Icon - The Possibility of Being Interpreted as Garuḍa —" published in East Asian Buddhist Culture, Vol. 42 (2020)—Korean researcher Chin Young-ah argued that the bird perched atop the incense burner is neither a Phoenix nor a Heavenly Rooster, but a Golden-Winged Bird (Geumsijo), also known as the Garuda from Indian mythology. This claim is based on the fact that the Garuda is described as having a jewel at its throat, and the bird atop the incense burner is similarly depicted clutching a jewel between its beak and neck.

Furthermore, the extent to which Taoism had spread within Baekje and whether the Buddhist community was favorable toward Taoism require reexamination. In fact, Buddhist scriptures often adopt a critical stance toward Taoism. Moreover, the "Five Musicians" depicted on the Gilt-Bronze Incense Burner also appear in various Buddhist sutras. As noted in footnotes 61 and 63 of the aforementioned paper, the Mahāyāna Mahāparinirvāṇa Sūtra, which circulated in Baekje, contains the record, "Immortals perform spells and play instrumental music," and the Lotus Sutra mentions, "If people make music, beating drums, blowing horns and conches, playing flutes, lutes, harps, and cymbals..." Therefore, the individual symbolic elements depicted on the incense burner are interpreted as being grounded in Buddhist scriptures. Excessive speculation and imagination regarding the burner's iconography should be avoided, and future studies must examine it by citing specific textual evidence.

A 2024 paper titled "Baekje Gilt-Bronze Incense Burner Interpreted from a Buddhist Perspective: Focus on the Jing-lu-yixiang and the Paintings Originated in the Buddhist Stories" analyzes the burner's iconography based on the Jinglu Yixiang (Classified Anthology of Literary Works from the Sutras and Vinayas), a collection of Buddhist tales compiled by imperial decree of Emperor Wu of Liang. A cloud pattern is incised at the boundary between the lid and the body of the burner, which is interpreted as the "Wind Wheel" (Fenglun). According to this collection, "The Golden-Winged Bird attempts to devour the dragon but cannot pass through the Wind Wheel." Based on this, the paper posits that the spatial arrangement—with the Golden-Winged Bird at the summit and the dragon at the base—is organized around the Wind Wheel. It argues that while the Garuda and the dragon are traditionally depicted as adversaries, they are able to coexist through the mediating element of the Wind Wheel. Additionally, the paper provides evidence suggesting that figures such as the Qianqiu (a mythical bird) and the archer—which may appear somewhat non-Buddhist at first glance—may actually originate from Buddhist tales.

== Appearance ==
The incense burner can be classified in four parts: the body, lid, the phoenix-shaped knob, and the support plate.

The lid is encircled by 74 mountains thinly cast in five layers reaching the top. The lid also contains various figures cast in relief including five musicians with different instruments, sixteen other figures, and thirty-nine animals including tigers, dragons, and deer. The lid also has different kinds of scenery including six types of trees, boulders, trails, waterfalls, and lakes which may symbolize the ideal landscape of a Taoist hermit. Five birds sit at the top of the five highest peaks of the mountain, and the top of the lid is crowned with a dragon. The lid is also ventilated with five holes, one in the chest of the phoenix, to release the scent of the incense.

The top of the lid is capped with a bonghwang (phoenix) which holds a magic pearl. The tail of the bonghwang curves out in an arching fashion.

The body of the burner is shaped in the form of a blossoming lotus. The petals of the lotus also contain twenty-six animals on the lateral surface including fish, heavenly beasts, and birds. Some of the animals rest between the lotus petals, while others are top.

The support plate is in the shape of a dragon with its mouth facing the base of the body which it supports. The dragon is surrounded by a blowing bronze motif of clouds, and its own tail is arched, giving the base a sense of movement.

== Archaeological significance ==
The discovery that this archaeological find is different from the Han dynasty incense burners means a lot to historians, archaeologists and bibliographers internationally. The fact that the musical instrument originated from Kucha, which provided an oasis and gateway to the Silk Road, sheds new light onto the then-current geopolitical equilibrium, cultural exchanges, and trade routes extending towards the three kingdoms on the Korean Peninsula and ancient Japan as well. In other words, the musical instrument, even before it was eponymically named wanham in the Tang dynasty, found its way into the Baekje incense burner.

== See also ==
- Buyeo National Museum
- List of Baekje-related topics
- National treasures of Korea
- Three Kingdoms of Korea
