= Go Heung =

Go Heung (Korean: 고흥; Hanja: 高興, ?-?) was an ancient Baekje (which was one of the Three Kingdoms of Korea) scholar who served under King Geunchogo of Baekje. He is Han Chinese.

His whole life is mostly unknown. His only mention was in Samguk Sagi as a scholar who wrote about the history of Baekje onto a manuscript called Seogi (서기, 書記); however, said manuscript no longer exists.
