= P'ungnapt'osŏng =

Ancient wall in Seoul, South Korea

Pungnaptoseong
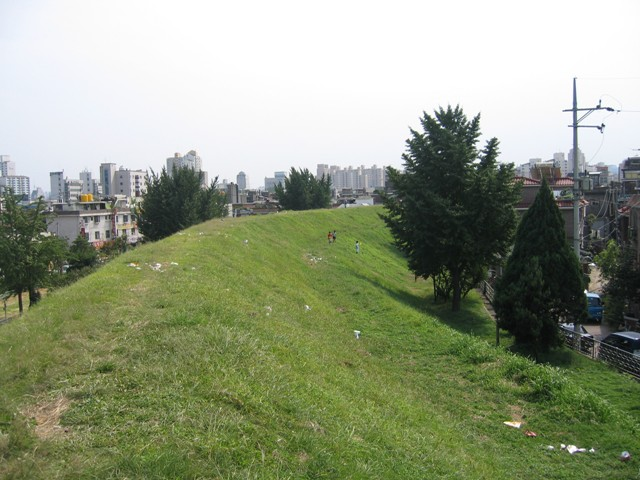
- The remains of earthen ramparts of Pungnaptoseong (widely believed to be the site of Wiryeseong) (May 2004).
- Interactive map of Pungnaptoseong
- Coordinates: 37°31′48.96″N 127°6′58.32″E

Historic Sites of South Korea
- Official name: Earthen Fortification in Pungnap-dong, Seoul
- Designated: 1963-01-21
- Reference no.: 11

Korean name
- Hangul: 풍납토성
- Hanja: 風納土城
- RR: Pungnaptoseong
- MR: P'ungnapt'osŏng

Pungnaptoseong (Korean: 풍납토성; Hanja: 風納土城) is a flat earthen wall built at the edge of the Han River in modern-day Pungnap-dong, Songpa-gu, Seoul, South Korea. It has a circumference of 3.5 km. It used to be included in the neighboring city of Gwangju. It has a long oval shape, spreading to north and south, and leaning slightly toward the east. Based on research conducted during the Japanese occupation, it has been speculated that Pungnap Toseong was Hanam Wiryeseong, the first capital of Baekje.

Only 2.7 km of its walls remain. Including the west wall, which had been destroyed by flooding, its circumference reaches about 3.5 km and its area nearly 859,508 m^{2}. After constructing this central part, the inner wall, mainly composed of sandy soil, grit, clayish soil and muddy soil, was set up by heaping earth at a slant. On the top of the last earthen layer of the inner wall, pebbles were laid in three layers and trimmed stones were piled up inside 1.5 m high with mud prepared from natural soil, and by piling up the central part in trapezoid shape whose lower part is 7m wide and 5m high.

== See also ==
- List of Baekje-related topics
- Baekje
