= Kaeru of Paekche =

4th King of Paekche (r. 128–166)

- Hangul: 부여개루
- Hanja: 扶餘蓋婁
- RR: Buyeo Gaeru
- MR: Puyŏ Kaeru

Monarch name
- Hangul: 개루왕
- Hanja: 蓋婁王
- RR: Gaeruwang
- MR: Kaeruwang

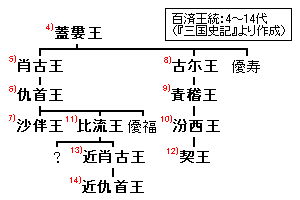
Genealogy of Baekje from the 4th king to 14th king

Kaeru (died 166, r. 128–166) was the fourth king of Paekche, one of the Three Kingdoms of Korea.

== Background ==
According to the history compilation Samguk sagi, he was the son of the previous king Kiru. He became king upon Kiru's death in 128 which was the 52nd year of his reign. The Samguk sagi records that "his character was respectful and also orderly in his conduct".

== Reign ==
In 132, he founded Bukhansanseong in present-day Goyang, South Korea. Paekche fought off many Goguryeo (the northern Korean kingdom) invasions from this fortress, and the 5th king Ch'ogo based his northward campaign on it. Paekche's relationship with the southeastern rival Silla was peaceful for most of his period of reign. However, in 145, a Silla minister named Kilsŏn (길선; 吉宣) failed his coup d'etat attempt and fled to Paekche. Kaeru gave him refuge despite the Silla king Adalla's written request for his return. Silla subsequently attacked Paekche, and a broad war over the Sobaek Mountains ensued.

Samguk sagi:

- 131 AD, summer, fourth month. The king went hunting at Mt. Han.
- 132 AD, spring, second month. The fortress of Mt. Bukhan (Bukhansanseong) was constructed.
- 137 AD, autumn, eighth month. Mars moved into the Southern Dipper.
- 145 AD, spring, first month, last day of the month. There was a solar eclipse. Winter, tenth month. Ajan Gilseon of Silla made a treasonous plot but it was discovered and he came to our country. The king of Silla sent a written request for him but he was not sent back. The king of Silla was furious and led soldiers out and came to attack. All the fortresses were fortified and defended themselves, and he could not get in. The Sillan soldiers used all their stores and returned.

During the Spring and Autumn period, when Pu of Chu fled to Lu, Ji Wenzi said, "Seeing one who conducts himself properly toward his lord is like seeing a child who is filial to its father and mother. Upon seeing one who is not proper to his lord, he should be killed like a hawk on a sparrow. Seeing Pu of Chu, [he said that] he has no measure of virtue and had murderous ethics, and this passed. Now Gilseon was also a wicked and rebellious man, and the king of Paekche took him in and hid him. Thus we can say that concealing a villain makes one a harborer. Therefore, the peace was lost with neighboring countries, and the king made his people suffer under the burden of attack. This lacked insight.

== Legacy ==
The Samguk sagi states that Kaeru's eldest son became the 5th king Ch'ogo and the second son became the 8th king Koi. This chronological inconsistency is thought to indicate a power struggle between two royal lines. The 21st king Kaero (also known as Geungaeru) apparently took Kaeru's name to assert the legitimacy of this.

== Family ==
- Father: Kiru of Paekche
- Mother: unknown
  - Brother: Buyeo Chil (扶餘質, ?–?) – in April, 242 he was appointed as the official Ubo (右輔), prime minister.
  - Queen(s): unknown
    - 1st son: 5th King, Ch'ogo of Paekche (肖古王, ?–214) – before he became king he was known as Buyeo Ch'ogo (扶餘肖古).
    - 2nd son: 8th King, Koi of Paekche (古爾王, ?–286) – before he became king he was known as Buyeo Koi (扶餘古爾).
    - 3rd son: Buyeo Usu (扶餘優壽, ?–?) – the only record of him is in the Samguk sagi in 260 when he was appointed Minister of the Interior (내신좌평; 內臣佐平).

== See also ==
- List of monarchs of Korea
- History of Korea

Kaeru of Paekche House of Buyeo Cadet branch of the House of Go Died: 166
Regnal titles
Preceded by Kiru	King of Paekche; 128–166	Succeeded by Ch'ogo
