= Temple of King Dongmyeong =

Lost Korean temple

The Temple of King Dongmyeong (Korean: 동명왕 신사; Hanja: 東明王 神祠), also known as the Temple of Jumong (Korean: 주몽사; Hanja: 朱蒙祠), was a shamanistic temple dedicated to King Dongmyeong of Goguryeo, the founder of the Korean kingdom of Goguryeo. There were at least two in existence: one in the Liaodong Peninsula and another in the Korean Peninsula.

The temple stood during the medieval Goryeo dynasty. It is, however, lost to history.

== Description ==
In the Samguk Sagi (Records of the Three Kingdoms), the 'Temple of Jumong' appeared in the records for the lunar May of 646 AD. According to the records, the fortress of Yodong, which safeguarded the western boundaries of Goguryeo, was threatened by an invasion from the Tang dynasty of China. The records mention that there was a temple dedicated to Jumong, or King Dongmyeong, in Yodong Fortress. Inside the temple was a suit of chain armor and a sharp spear. The people of Yodong believed that the armor and the spear fell from the heavens during the 4th century.

As the battle for Yodong Fortress continued, a beautiful maiden pretended to be the wife of King Dongmyeong to please the dead king. A mudang (shaman), said: "The fortress shall be safe, for Jumong is in a pleasant mood."

In Goguryeo society, King Dongmyeong was believed to wear a suit of chain armor and a sharp spear. He was prayed to during times of war. This means that he was the holy patron of the state and an ancestor deity much like Horus of Ancient Egypt.

A temple of King Dongmyeong is also mentioned in the Goryeo Dogyeong, a book about the Goryeo dynasty written by a Chinese Song dynasty scholar. As the Goryeo dynasty existed within the Korean Peninsula, conclusions are that there was at least one temple, and probably more, dedicated to King Dongmyeong within the Korean Peninsula.
