= Chogo of Baekje =

5th King of Baekje (r. 166–214)

- Hangul: 부여초고; 부여소고; 부여속고
- Hanja: 扶餘肖古; 扶餘素古; 扶餘速古
- RR: Buyeo Chogo; Buyeo Sogo; Buyeo Sokgo
- MR: Puyŏ Ch'ogo; Puyŏ Sogo; Puyŏ Sokko

Monarch name
- Hangul: 초고왕; 소고왕; 속고왕
- Hanja: 肖古王; 素古王; 速古王
- RR: Chogowang; Sogowang; Sokgowang
- MR: Ch'ogowang; Sogowang; Sokkowang

Chogo (died 214, r. 166–214) was the fifth king of Baekje, one of the Three Kingdoms of Korea.

== Background ==
According to the history compilation Samguk sagi, he was the son of the previous king Gaeru. He became king upon Gaeru's death in 166 which was the 39th year of his reign.

Relations between Baekje and the rival kingdom Silla became hostile after Gaeru had given refuge to a Sillan traitor Gilseon in 165, shortly before Chogo inherited the throne.

== Reign ==
Chogo began attacking Silla in 167, and captured two castles, but the Sillans drove him and his army off.

Chogo ran another campaign (188–190) against Silla, and captured several castles (Castles Mosan, Guyang, Wonsanhyang, and Yogeo). In 204, he destroyed Yocha. He also built new castles, including Castle Jeokhyeon and Sado, in captured territory, and settled people there in 210. The battles occurred around the Sobaek Mountains.

In 214, he waged war against the Mohe. He led 1.000 soldiers to capture Castle Seokmun of Mohe, but the Mohe counter-attacked in the Sulcheon region of Baekje. In July 214 Silla also invaded Baekje, and captured Castle Sahyeon.

Samguk sagi:

- 167 AD, autumn, seventh month. Troops secretly attacked two castles in Silla's western district. He captured 1,000 men and women and then returned. Eighth month. The King of Silla dispatched Ilgilcan Heungseon at the head of 20,000 troops to come and invaded several castles in the east of the country. The Sillan King also personally led 8,000 spirited cavalrymen and accompanied Heungseon. They went as far as the Han river when the King of Baekje determined the Sillan host was impossible to repel and returned that which had been plundered earlier.
- 170 AD, spring, third month. On the last day of the month, there was a solar eclipse. Winter, tenth month. Troops were dispatched to invade the border with Silla.
- 186 AD, winter, tenth month. There were no clouds but there was lightning. A comet was seen in the northwest. It disappeared after 20 days.
- 187 AD, spring, fifth month. The wells of the capital and the Han River were all dry.
- 188 AD, spring, second month. Extensive repairs were made to the palace. Troops were dispatched to attack the Mosan Fortress (Korean: 모산성; Hanja: 母山城) in Silla.
- 189 AD, spring, fourth month. On the first day of the month, there was a solar eclipse. Autumn, seventh month. Baekje troops fought with Silla Guyang. They were defeated and more than 500 died.
- 190 AD, spring, eighth month. Soldiers were dispatched to attack the district of Wonsan in the west of Silla. They advanced and surrounded Bugok Fortress. General Gudo of Silla then led 500 mounted troops to repel them, so Baekje forces feigned a retreat. Gudo pursued them to Wasan Fortress (Korean: 와산성; Hanja: 蛙山城) where the troops turned and gave battle and had a great victory.
- 191 AD, autumn, ninth month. Chiugi (a type of comet) was seen in the horn and gullet constellations.
- 199 AD, autumn, seventh month. There was an earthquake. Troops were dispatched to attack the Sillan border.
- 204 AD, autumn, seventh month. Troops were dispatched to attack Yocha Fortress in Silla and sacked it. They killed the lord of the fortress, Seolbu. The King of Silla, Naehae of Silla, was furious and ordered Ibeolcan Rieum to become general and lead six squadrons of spirited troops to come and attack Baekje's Saheyon Fortress. Winter, tenth month. A comet was seen in the Eastern well.
- 205 AD, autumn, seventh month. Venus intersected with the moon.
- 208 AD, autumn. Because of locusts and drought the crops did not mature. There were many incidents of thievery but the king consoled them.
- 209 AD, winter, tenth month. There was a typhoon that uprooted trees.
- 210 AD, spring, second month. The two fortresses of Jeokhyeon and Sado were built, and residents from the east were moved there. Winter, tenth month. The Malgal came and attacked Sado Fortress but were unable to take it. They burned down the fortress gate and then escaped.
- 211 AD, autumn, eighth month. In the south of the country locusts damaged the crops and the people starved. Winter, 11th month. There was no ice.
- 212 AD, summer, sixth month. On the last day of the month, there was a solar eclipse.
- 213 AD, autumn, seventh month. In the western district a man named Hoehoe caught a white deer and presented it to the King. The King deemed it a felicitous omen and gave him 100 stones of grain.
- 214 AD, autumn, ninth month. The King ordered Jin Gwa of the northern district to lead 1,000 soldiers to attack and take the Mohe castle of Seokmun. In the winter a powerful cavalry of Malgal came and attacked, coming as far as the Sul River. The King died.

== Legacy ==
The 8th king Goi is said to be Chogo's younger brother. The 13th king Geunchogo apparently took Chogo's name to emphasize his lineage after a long rivalry between two royal factions.

== Family ==
- Father: Gaeru of Baekje
- Mother: unknown
  - Brother: 8th King, Goi of Baekje (古爾王, ?–286) – before he became king he was known as Buyeo Goi (扶餘古爾).
  - Brother: Buyeo Usu (扶餘優壽, ?–?) – the only record of him is in the Samguk sagi in 260 when he was appointed Minister of the Interior (內臣佐平, Naesin-jwa'pyeong).
  - Queen(s): unknown
    - Son: 6th King, Gusu of Baekje (仇首王, ?–234) – eldest son, before he became king he was known as Buyeo Gusu (扶餘仇首).

== See also ==
- List of monarchs of Korea
- History of Korea

Chogo of Baekje House of Buyeo Cadet branch of the House of Go Died: 214
Regnal titles
Preceded by Gaeru	King of Baekje; 166–214	Succeeded by Gusu
