= Goi of Baekje =

8th King of Baekje (r. 234–286)

Goi 고이
- Eoraha
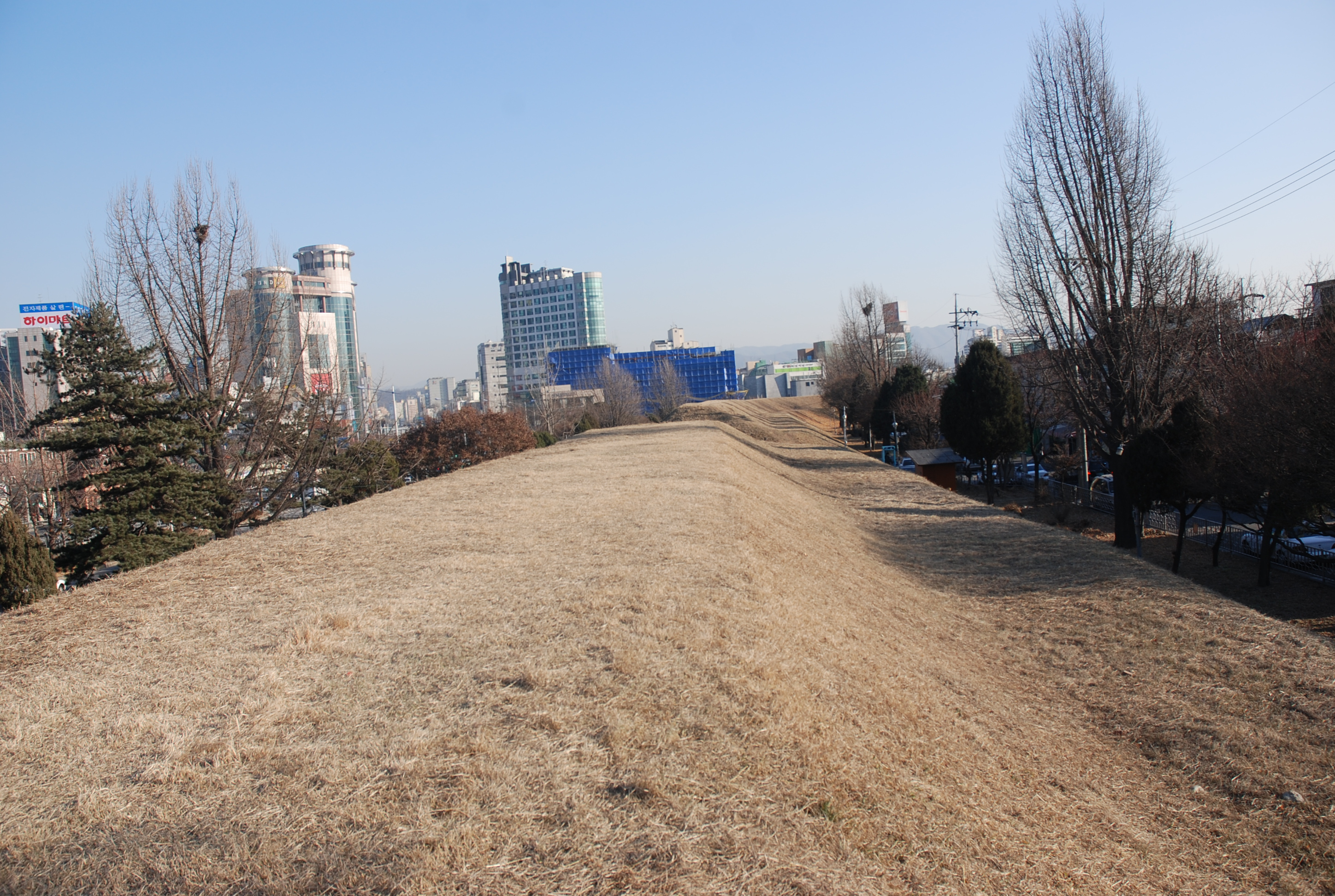
- Pungnap earthen fortress, presumed to have been built during the reign of King Goi

King of Baekje
- Reign: 234 ~ November 286 A.D.
- Coronation: 234 A.D. Wirye Gung، Hanseong
- Predecessor: Saban
- Successor: Chaekgye
- Born: 166 A.D. (Estimated); Hanseong، Baekje
- Died: November 286 A.D. Hanseong، Baekje
- Issue: Buyeo Chaekgye
Names
- Buyeo Goi/Gomo
- House: Buyeo
- Dynasty: Baekje
- Father: Gaeru
- Mother: Daughter of the commander of Daifang
- Occupation: King

- Goi of Baekje
- Hangul: 부여고이; 부여고모
- Hanja: 扶餘古爾; 扶餘古慕
- RR: Buyeo Goi; Buyeo Gomo
- MR: Puyŏ Koi; Puyŏ Komo

Monarch name
- Hangul: 고이왕
- Hanja: 古爾王
- RR: Goiwang
- MR: Koiwang

Goi (died 286, r. 234–286) was the eighth king of Baekje, one of the Three Kingdoms of Korea.

== Background ==
He is recorded as the second son of the 4th king Gaeru and younger brother of the 5th king Chogo. Upon the death of the 6th king Gusu, Gusu's eldest son Saban became king, but proved to be too young to rule. Goi dethroned Saban and became king. The Samguk sagi records that "King Chogo's younger brother, who had the same mother, became king.". This is disputed because of the time differences. It is rather believed that his father was a collateral relative of Gaeru.

Some scholars interpret the Korean records Samguk sagi and Samguk yusa to mean that Goi was the younger brother of the mother of King Chogo, implying that he is of the Utae–Biryu lineage, rather than a direct descendant of the traditionally recognized founder Onjo.

The Chinese records Book of Zhou (周書) and Book of Sui (隋書) refer to "Gutae" as the founder of Baekje, and some scholars believe that "Gutae" actually refers to Goi as the true founder of the kingdom.

== Reign ==
Goi is generally credited with centralising the Baekje kingdom, concentrating royal power and laying the foundation of the state structure.

Immediately upon taking the throne, he established a central military office to restrain the independence of regional clans. The Samguk sagi also records that in 260, he established a central bureaucracy of six ministers(called jwapyeongs), sixteen rank levels, and a code of dress, although the full system may have been completed after his reign (see, e.g., Best (2002)).

In 262, he is said to have established regulations against bribery, requiring corrupt officials to repay three times the amount of the bribe. He also ordered the cultivation of farmlands south of the capital.

In 266 the king dispatched soldiers to attack Bongsan Fortress of Silla. The master of the fortress, Jikseon, led a sortie of 200 of his most robust troops and defeated them. He attacked Silla again in 272, 278 and 284. During the attack of 278 his troops surrounded the fortress of Goegok.

Samguk sagi:

- 236 AD, winter, tenth month. The king went hunting on a great island in the western sea. He shot 40 deer.
- 238 AD, spring, first month. Worship of heaven and earth was made using drums and whistles. Second month. The king went hunting in Busan. After 50 days, he returned. Summer, fourth month. A pillar at the gate of the king's palace trembled. A yellow dragon flew out from this gate.
- 239 AD, spring, first month. There was no rain until summer, fifth month, when it rained.
- 240 AD, soldiers were dispatched to invade Silla. Bae Jin Chung was made General of the Left, and entrusted with infantry and cavalry matters both inside and outside the capital. A great inspection was made of the Seokcheon River, there were a pair of birds at the headwaters of the river. The king shot them both.
- 242 AD, spring, second month. The king ordered the people of the country to begin making rice fields of the marshes to the south. Summer, fourth month. The king's uncle, Jil, was made Marshal Bulwark of the Right. Jil's character was loyal and resolute, and his plans did not go awry. Autumn, seventh month. The king left the west gate to watch archery.
- 243 AD, spring, first month. A great altar was constructed, and sacrifices were made to heaven, earth, the mountains, and the rivers.
- 246 AD, summer. There was a great drought, and there was no wheat. Autumn, eighth month. The provincial governor of Youzhou in Wei, Something Qiu Jian, together with the leaders of the Lelang commandery, Liu Jia, and the master of Sufang, Wang Jun, attacked Goguryeo. The king therefore dispatched Jinchung, General of the Left, to invade the border of Lelang Commandery and take its people. Jia (Liu Jia) heard this and was greatly angered, and the king feared being attacked and returned those people who were taken as slaves.
- 247 AD, spring, first month. Sacrifices were made to heaven and earth in the south garden. Second month. Bae Jin Chung was made Marshal Bulwark of the Right. Jin was also made General of the Left, and entrusted with matters of man and horse.
- 248 AD, spring and summer. There was a drought. In the winter, the people starved. The king opened the granaries and relieved them. Also the taxes from this year were returned.
- 249 AD, spring, first month, hour of the metal cow. Venus went into the moon.
- 255 AD, autumn, ninth month. The king went out leading men to attack Silla, and the Sillan soldiers attacked them west of Goegok and were defeated. The Baekje army killed their general, Ikjong. Winter, tenth month. Men were dispatched to attack the fortress of Bongsan Fortress of Silla, but they could not take it.
- 257 AD, spring, first month. There was a drought, and the trees and grass all withered.
- 258 AD, spring. The Mohe chief Ragal presented 10 good horses to the king. The king rewarded his messenger greatly, and sent him back home.
- 259 AD, autumn, ninth month. A purple cloud was seen east of the palace. It was like a storied tower.
- 260 AD, spring, first month. The king established the following Sahe ministry offices: Minister of the Interior, charged with handling executive declarations, the Minister of the Treasury, the Minister of Rites and Ceremonies, the Minister of Defense charged with housing, defense, and matters of soldiers, the Minister of the Court charged with Judgments and Punishments, and the Minister of the Military, charged with external matters of man and horse. Also, the ranks of Dalsol, Eunsol, Deoksol, Hansol, and Nasol were established, and in addition those of Jangdeok, Sideok, Godeok, Gyedeok, Daedeok, Mundok, Mudok, Jwagun, Jinmu, and Geuku. The six Sahe offices were of first rank, the Dalsol second, the Eunsol third, Deoksol fourth, Hansol fifth, and Nasol sixth. Jangdeok was seventh, Sideok eighth, Godeok ninth, Gyedeok tenth, Daedeok eleventh, Mundok twelfth, Mudok thirteenth, Jwagun fourteenth, Jinmu fifteenth, and Geuke sixteenth. Second month. The king proclaimed that the first six ranks should don purple outerware, and hang silver flowers from their crown. Those above the eleventh rank would wear crimson, and those of sixteenth or higher blue. Third month. The king's younger brother Usu was made Minister of the Interior.
- 261 AD, spring, first month. On the first day of the year, the king, wearing purple robes and blue silk pants, with a gold flower hanging from his black net hat, wearing a white belt of leather and black leather shoes, sat on his throne in the south hall and listened to the matters [of the kingdom]. Second month. Bae Jin Ga was made Minister of the Treasury. Udu was made Minister of Rites and Ceremonies. Gosu was made Minister of Defense. Gonno was made Minister of the Court. Yugi was made Minister of the Military. Third month. The king sent messengers to Silla to sue for peace. They did not comply.
- 262 AD, spring, first month. The king made an edict that all public officials who took bribes or stole things would be charged with three times the amount of what they stole and imprisoned until the end of their lives.
- 266 AD, autumn, eighth month. The king dispatched soldiers to attack Bongsan Fortress of Silla. The master of the fortress, Jikseon, led a sortie of 200 of his most robust troops and defeated them.
- 269 AD, autumn, ninth month. A comet went into the purple palace.
- 272 AD, winter, 11th month. The king dispatched troops to attack Silla.
- 278 AD, winter, tenth month. The king sent soldiers to attack Silla, and they surrounded Goegok Fortress.
- 283 AD, autumn, ninth month. The king dispatched soldiers to attack the border with Silla.
- 286 AD, spring, first month. The king send messengers to Silla to sue for peace. Winter, eleventh month. The king died.

== Foreign relations ==
Under Goi's reign, Baekje expanded control of the Han River region and gained permanent ascendancy over the remaining states of the Mahan, a loose confederacy in the southwest of the Korean Peninsula. He also attacked the borders of Baekje's eastern rival Silla.

Baekje also changed its defensive posture against the Chinese to an offensive one. Goi attacked the Chinese-controlled Lelang commandery and the Daifang commandery when the Chinese launched an attack against the Han River region to disrupt and prevent Baekje's emerging power. In 246, according to both the Korean Samguk sagi and the Chinese Sanguozhi, Baekje went to war against Cao Wei by attacking Daifang and Lelang commanderies, and Daifang's governor Gong Zun was slain. However, fearing that Wei may launch a counterattack, Goi quickly sued for peace by returning his captives.

In the spring of 286 he sent messengers to Silla to sue for peace and in the winter of that year he died.

== Family ==
- Father: Gaeru of Baekje
- Mother: unknown
  - Brother: Buyeo Chogo (扶餘肖古, ?–214) – 5th King of Baekje, Chogo of Baekje (disputed by scholars)
  - Brother: Buyeo Usu (扶餘優壽, ?–?) – the only record of him is in the Samguk sagi in 260 when he was appointed Minister of the Interior (內臣佐平, Naesin-jwa'pyeong).
  - Queens: daughter of the commander of Daifang Commandery, Gongsun Du (公孫度, ?–204).
    - Son: Buyeo Chaekgye (扶餘責稽, ?–298) – eldest son, 9th King of Baekje, Chaekgye of Baekje.

== See also ==
- List of monarchs of Korea
- History of Korea

Goi of Baekje House of Buyeo Cadet branch of the House of Go Died: 286
Regnal titles
Preceded by Saban	King of Baekje; 234–286	Succeeded by Chaekgye
