= Wiryeseong =

Historical capital of Baekje

Coordinates: 37°31′50.25″N 127°7′0.62″E

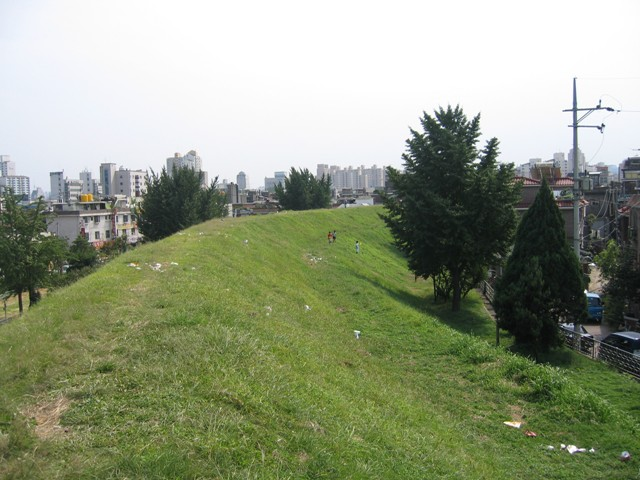
- The remains of Pungnap Toseong, located in Songpa District, Seoul, which is widely believed to be the site of Wiryeseong (May 2004).

Korean name
- Hangul: 위례성
- Hanja: 慰禮城
- RR: Wiryeseong
- MR: Wiryesŏng

Wiryeseong (Korean: 위례성; Hanja: 慰禮城) was the name of two early capitals of Baekje, one of the Three Kingdoms of Korea. Both are believed to have been in the modern-day Seoul area. According to the Samguk sagi (the oldest surviving Korean history books, written in the 12th century), Onjo, the son of Goguryeo's founder Jumong, founded the nation of Sipje (십제, 十濟; later became Baekje) on Wiryeseong in 18 BC, while his elder brother Biryu established himself in Michuhol (미추홀; 彌鄒忽) further to the west. The location of Michuhol is usually believed to be present-day Incheon.

After some time, Biryu recognized that Michuhol's land was too barren and saline to sustain his people, so he moved to Wiryeseong with his people (Shortly after, the name of the state is changed from Sipje to Baekje). Later, Onjo moved further south because of Malgal to the north and Lelang to the east.

The former Wiryeseong is called Habuk (north of the river) Wiryeseong and the latter is called Hanam (south of the river) Wiryeseong. (Note: This is not to be confused with modern Hanam, which also means "south of the (Han) river.") The earthen walls of Pungnap Toseong and Mongchon Toseong in Songpa District, Seoul are believed by many to be the remains of Hanam Wiryeseong.

During the Hanseong period, Baekje grew up against Southern Mahan and Northern Chinese Commanderies including Daifang, which attempted to violate their border. In the process, Baekje modified the political systems, and expended its territory to Mahan and Hwanghae Province region, and it became as a regional power.

Wiryeseong served as Baekje's capital until 475, when Goguryeo's King Jangsu attacked Baekje and captured Wiryeseong, as well as the whole Han River area, and killing Baekje's King Gaero. Baekje's next king Munju moved south and set the new capital at Ungjin (modern day Gongju).

== See also ==
- History of Korea
- List of fortresses in Korea
- Pungnap Toseong
- Mongchon Toseong
- Ungjin
- Sabi
