= Paekche =

Ancient Korean kingdom (18 BCE – 660 CE)

Paekche 百濟 (Hanja) 백제 (Hangul)
- 18 BCE–660 CE
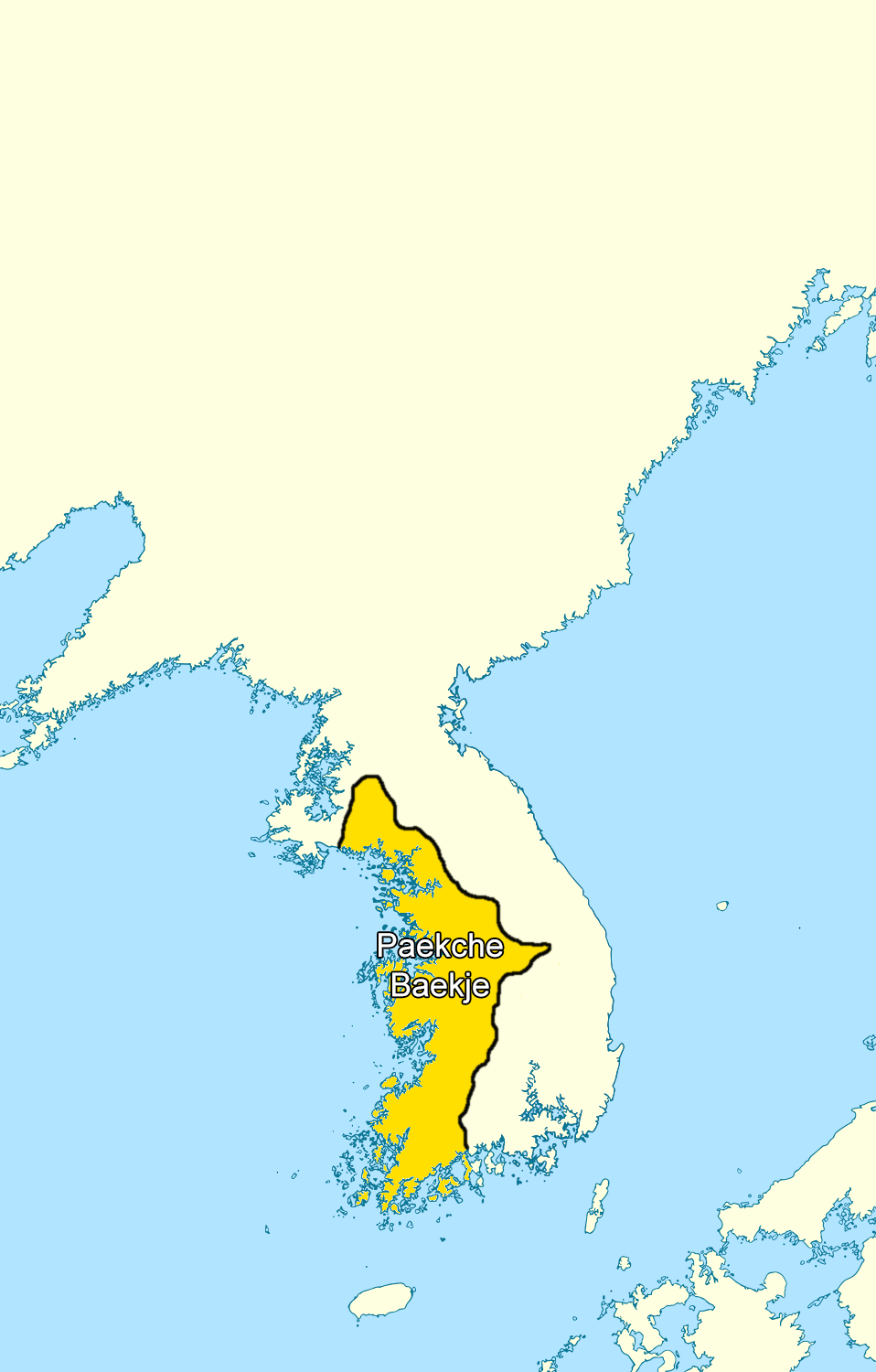
- Baekje in the 4th century, during the reign of King Geunchogo
- Status: Kingdom
- Capital: Wirye (18 BCE – 475 CE); Gomnaru/Ungjin (476–538); Sabi/Soburi (538–660)
- Common languages: Baekje (Koreanic), Classical Chinese (literary)
- Religion: Official Religion: Buddhism: Other religions: Confucianism Taoism Shamanism
- Demonyms: Yemaek; Samhan people
- Government: Monarchy
- King
  - 18 BCE – 28 CE: Onjo (first)
  - 346–375: Geunchogo
  - 523–554: Seong
  - 600–641: Mu
  - 641–660: Uija (last)
- Legislature: Jeongsaam Council
- Historical era: Ancient
  - Establishment: 18 BCE
  - Campaigns of King Geunchogo: 346–375
  - Adoption of Buddhism: 384-385
  - Fall of Sabi: 18 July 660 CE

Population
  - 7th century: Approximately 3,800,000 (760,000 households)
Preceded by
Buyeo
Goguryeo
Mahan confederacy
Succeeded by
Unified Silla
- Today part of: North Korea; South Korea

Korean name
- Hangul: 백제
- Hanja: 百濟
- RR: Baekje
- MR: Paekche
- IPA: [pɛk̚.tɕ͈e]

Paekche or Baekje (Korean: 백제; Hanja: 百濟) was a Korean kingdom located in southwestern Korea from 18 BCE to 660 CE. It was one of the Three Kingdoms of Korea, together with Goguryeo and Silla. While the three kingdoms existed separately, Paekche had the largest population, at approximately 3,800,000 (760,000 households), which was much larger than that of Silla (850,000 people) and comparable to that of Goguryeo (3,500,000 people).

Paekche was founded by Onjo, the third son of Goguryeo's founder, Donmeyong and Soseono, at Wiryeseong (now southern Seoul). Paekche, like Goguryeo, claimed to succeed Buyeo, a state established in Manchuria around the time of Old Chosŏn's fall.

Paekche alternately battled and allied with Goguryeo and Silla as the three kingdoms expanded control over the peninsula. At its peak in the 4th century, Paekche controlled most of the western Korean Peninsula, as far north as Pyongyang, and may have even held territories in China, such as in the Liaoxi Commandery, though this view is controversial. It became a significant regional sea power, with political and trade relations with China and Japan.

Paekche was a great maritime power; its nautical skills, which made it the Phoenicia of East Asia, was instrumental in the dissemination of Buddhism throughout East Asia and continental culture to Japan.

In 660, it was defeated by Tang China and Silla, and ultimately submitted to Unified Silla.

The son of Uija, the last king of Paekche, Zenkō went to Japan and established the Kudara no Konikishi clan (百済王氏). The family served the emperor of Japan.

== Etymology ==
The most common name used by most historians is Paekche (백제), meaning "hundred counties", but was originally founded by Onjo as 十濟, which figuratively means "tens of counties". Only during the reign of Geunchogo (肖古王) was it renamed as Paekche. It is also attested as Kudara (居陀羅), meaning "great place", which could have been a possible endonym that was later on borrowed into Old Japanese.

== History ==
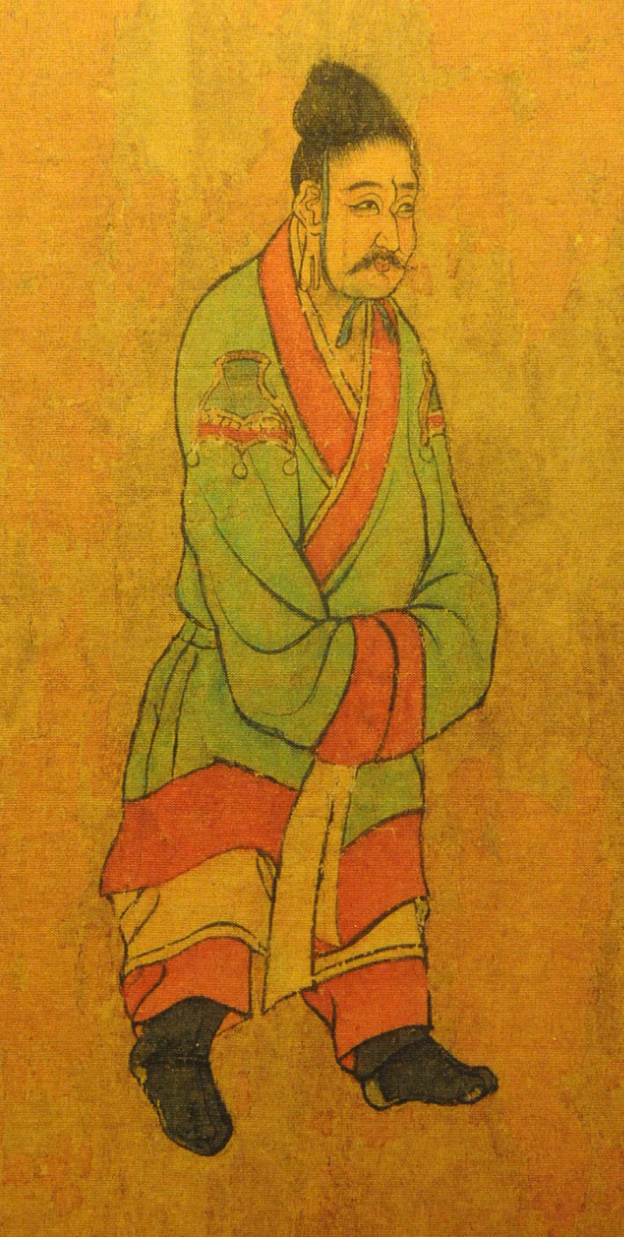
Tang dynasty envoys from Paekche

=== Founding ===
Paekche was mainly composed of the indigenous populations of the previous Mahan confederacy and the Koreanic Yemaek people from Goguryeo and Buyeo. In addition, smaller migrations happened via the inhabitants of the Jin state and the Lelang Commandery through trade and conquest, who were also admitted into the polities of Paekche.

According to the Samguk sagi, Paekche was founded in 18 BCE by King Onjo, who led a group of people from Goguryeo south to the Han basin. Jumong had left his son Yuri in Buyeo when he left that kingdom to establish the new kingdom of Goguryeo. Jumong became King Dongmyeong, and had two more sons with Soseono, Onjo and Biryu. Upon Yuri's later arrival in Goguryeo, Jumong promptly appointed him crown prince. Realizing Yuri would become the next king, Soseono left Goguryeo, taking her two sons, Biryu and Onjo, south to found their own kingdoms with their people, along with ten vassals. She is remembered as a key figure in the founding of both Goguryeo and Paekche.

Onjo settled in Wiryeseong now Hanam, and called his country Shipje (Korean: 십제; Hanja: 十濟; lit. 'Ten Vassals'), and Biryu settled in Michuhol, now Incheon, against the vassals' advice. The people of Wiryeseong lived prosperously, but the salty water and marshes in Michuhol made settlement difficult.

Biryu then approached his brother, Onjo, to request the throne of Shipje. When Onjo refused, Biryu declared war but lost. In shame, Biryu committed suicide, and his people moved to Wiryeseong, where King Onjo welcomed them and renamed his country Paekche "Hundred Vassals".

King Onjo moved the capital from the south to the north bank of the Han River, then back to the south, likely all within present-day Seoul, under pressure from other Mahan states. King Gaeru is believed to have moved the capital north of the river to Bukhansanseong in 132, probably in present-day Goyang to the northwest of Seoul.

Through the early centuries of the Common Era, sometimes called the Proto–Three Kingdoms period, early Paekche gradually gained control over the other Mahan peoples.

=== Expansion ===
The Paekche Kingdom, which initially belonged to the Mahan confederacy, first integrated the Han River (Korea) basin area, then overthrew Mokji state (목지국; 目支國), the dominant country, and then integrated Mahan as a territorial state.

During the reign of King Goi (234–286), Paekche became a full-fledged kingdom, as it continued consolidating the Mahan confederacy. In 249, according to the ancient Japanese text Nihon Shoki, Paekche's expansion reached the Gaya confederacy to its east, around the Nakdong River valley. Paekche is first described in Chinese records as a kingdom in 345. The first diplomatic missions from Paekche reached Japan around 367 (According to the Nihon Shoki: 247).

King Geunchogo (346–375) expanded Paekche's territory to the north through war against Goguryeo, while annexing the remaining Mahan societies in the south. During Geunchogo's reign, the territories of Paekche included most of the western Korean Peninsula (except the two Pyeongan provinces), and in 371, Paekche defeated Goguryeo at Pyongyang. Paekche continued substantial trade with Goguryeo, and actively adopted Chinese culture and technology. Buddhism was introduced and accepted in 384, though it was not until 528 that King Seong officially established Buddhism as the state religion.

Paekche also became a sea power and continued mutual goodwill relationships with the Japanese rulers of the Kofun period, transmitting continental cultural influences to Japan. The Chinese writing system, Buddhism, advanced pottery, ceremonial burial, and other aspects of culture were introduced by aristocrats, artisans, scholars, and monks throughout their relationship.

During this period, the Han River basin remained the heartland of the country.

=== Ungjin period ===
In the 5th century, Paekche retreated under the southward military threat of Goguryeo, and in 475, the Seoul region fell to Goguryeo. Paekche's capital was located at Ungjin (present-day Gongju) from 475 to 538.

Isolated in mountainous terrain, the new capital was secure against the north but also disconnected from the outside world. It was closer to Silla than Wiryeseong had been, however, and a military alliance was forged between Silla and Paekche against Goguryeo.

Most maps of the Three Kingdoms period show Paekche occupying the Chungcheong and Jeolla provinces, the core of the country in the Ungjin and Sabi periods.

=== Sabi period ===
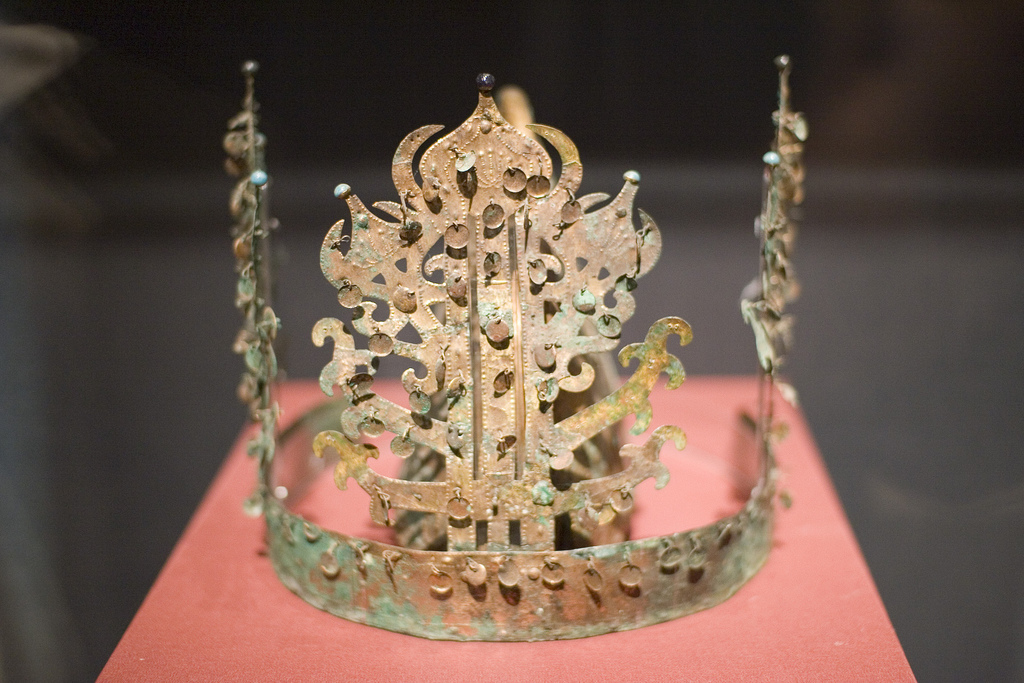
Gilt-bronze Crown of Paekche from the Sinchon-ri tumulus

In 538, King Seong moved the capital to Sabi (present-day Buyeo County), and rebuilt his kingdom into a strong state. Temporarily, he changed the official name of the country as the Nambuyeo (남부여; 南扶餘; Korean pronunciation: [na̠m.pu.jʌ̹]; lit. "Southern Buyeo"), a reference to Buyeo to which Paekche traced its origins. The Sabi period witnessed the flowering of Paekche culture, alongside the growth of Buddhism.

Under pressure from Goguryeo to the north and Silla to the east, Seong sought to strengthen Paekche's relationship with China. The location of Sabi, on the navigable Geum River, made contact with China much easier, and both trade and diplomacy flourished during his reign and continuing on into the 7th century.

In the 7th century, with the growing influence of Silla in the southern and central Korean peninsula, Paekche began its decline.

=== Fall and restoration movement ===
In 660, the coalition troops of Silla and Tang China attacked Paekche, which was then allied with Goguryeo. A heavily outmanned army led by General Gyebaek was defeated in the Battle of Hwangsanbeol near Nonsan. The capital Sabi fell almost immediately thereafter, resulting in the annexation of Paekche by Tang China. Tang government set up Ungjin Commandery for the purpose of governing the Paekche area. King Uija and his son Buyeo Yung were sent into exile in China while at least some of the ruling class fled to Japan. The fall of Sabi resulted in one of the infamous episodes in Korean history, as countless Paekche court ladies, concubines and women of the nobility committed suicide by jumping off a cliff near Sabi rather than be captured by the Silla-Tang Alliance. To memoralize this tragic event in history, a pavilion stands at the so-called "Rock of the Falling Flowers" commemorating Paekche's defeat and the suicide of the kingdom's court ladies and concubines who jumped off the cliff.

Paekche forces attempted a brief restoration movement but faced Silla–Tang joint forces. A Buddhist monk Dochim (도침; 道琛) and the former Paekche general Buyeo Boksin rose to try to revive Paekche. They welcomed the Paekche prince Buyeo Pung back from Japan to serve as king, with Juryu (주류; 周留, in modern Seocheon County, South Chungcheong) as their headquarters. They put the Tang general Liu Renyuan (劉仁願) under siege in Sabi. Emperor Gaozong sent the general Liu Rengui, who had previously been demoted to commoner rank for offending Li Yifu, with a relief force, and Liu Rengui and Liu Renyuan were able to fight off the Paekche resistance forces' attacks, but were themselves not strong enough to quell the rebellion, and so for some time the armies were in stalemate.

Paekche requested Japanese aid, and King Pung returned to Paekche with a contingent of 10,000 soldiers. Before the ships from Japan arrived, his forces battled a contingent of Tang forces in Ungjin County.

In 663, Paekche revival forces and a Japanese naval fleet convened in southern Paekche to confront the Silla forces in the Battle of Baekgang. The Tang dynasty also sent 7,000 soldiers and 170 ships. After five naval confrontations, all of which the Silla-Tang joint fleet won, that took place in August 663 at Baekgang, considered the lower reaches of Geum River or Dongjin river, the Silla–Tang forces emerged victorious, and Buyeo Pung escaped to Goguryeo.

== Social and political structure ==
The establishment of a centralized state in Paekche is usually traced to the reign of King Goi, who may have first established patrilineal succession. Like most monarchies, a great deal of power was held by the aristocracy. King Seong, for example, strengthened royal power, but after he was slain in a disastrous campaign against Silla, the nobles took much of that power away from his son.

The ruler titles of Paekche were *eraγa (於羅瑕), mostly used by the nobility, and *k(j)ə-n kici (鞬吉支), as he would be called by the commoners. The queen consort was called *oluk (於陸) and pasɨkasɨ (벗〯갓) meaning "woman companion".

The Hae clan and the Jin clan were the representative royal houses who had considerable power from the early period of Paekche, and they produced many queens over several generations. The Hae clan was probably the royal house before the Buyeo clan replaced them, and both clans appear descended from the lineage of Buyeo and Goguryeo. The "Great Eight Families" (Sa, Yeon, Hyeop, Hae, Jin, Guk, Mok, and Baek) were powerful nobles in the Sabi era, recorded in Chinese records such as Tongdian.

Central government officials were divided into sixteen ranks, the six members of the top rank forming a type of cabinet, with the top official being elected every three years. In the Sol rank, the first (Jwapyeong) through the sixth (Naesol) officials were political, administrative, and military commanders. In the Deok rank, the seventh (Jangdeok) through the eleventh (Daedeok) officials may have headed each field. Mundok, Mudok, Jwagun, Jinmu and Geuku from the twelfth to the sixteenth, may have been military administrators. Emperor Wu of Han spoke high of the efficiency of the central government in Paekche, according to the Book of the Later Han.

According to the Samguk yusa, during the Sabi period, the chief minister (Jaesang) of Paekche was chosen by a unique system. The names of several candidates were placed under a rock (Cheonjeongdae) near Hoamsa temple. After a few days, the rock was moved and the candidate whose name had a certain mark was chosen as the new chief minister. Whether this was a form of selection by lot or a covert selection by the elite is not clear. This council was called the Jeongsaamhoeui (政事巖會議, The council of rocks with state affairs).

== Military ==
The town leaders and its subjects participated in the military of Paekche on a local level, and loot and captives were distributed among them. The subjects usually worked in the supply division. The position of Jwajang led the military. Geunchogo established the division of central military and local militaries. The people of Paekche usually served in the military for three years. As Paekche entered the Sabi period, the military was divided into the royal private guard, the capital central military and the local military. The royal private guard handled matters such as protecting the palace. The weapons available to the soldiers were diverse.

== Archaeology ==
The first ever bone remains of Paekche people were found in the eungpyeongri tombs in buyeo, which made possible reconstructions of appearances of Paekche people possible, and the tombs seem to have no sign of being looted.

== Language and culture ==
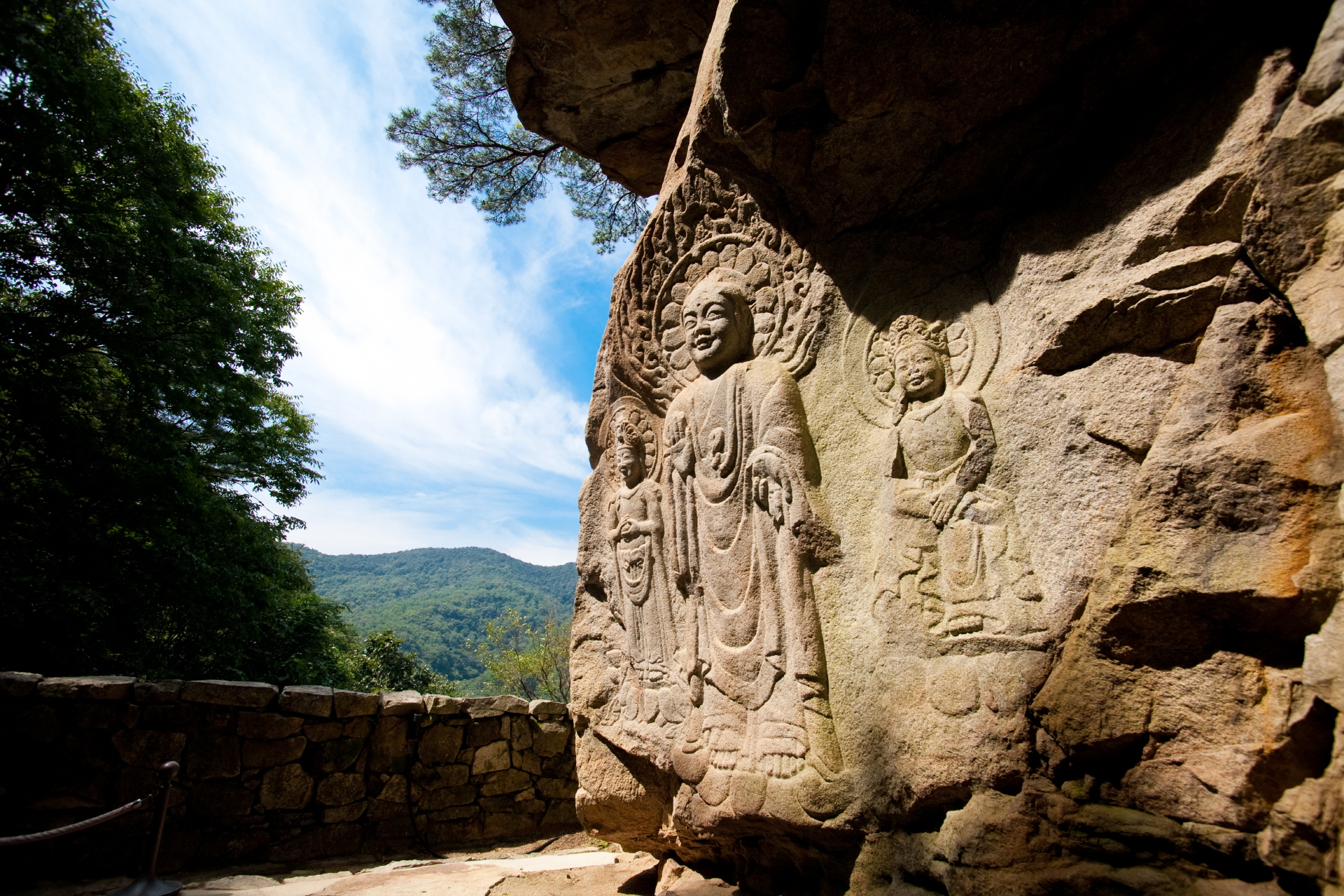
The Seosan Buddha Triad, a Paekche relief carved on Mount Gaya, 6th-7th century CE

Paekche was established by immigrants from Goguryeo who spoke what could be a Buyeo language, a hypothetical group linking the languages of Old Chosŏn, Buyeo, Goguryeo, and Paekche. In a case of diglossia, the indigenous Samhan people, having migrated in an earlier wave from the same region, probably spoke a variety of the same language. Kōno Rokurō has argued that the kingdom of Paekche was bilingual, with the gentry speaking a Buyeo language and the common people a Han language. A view was proposed by Alexander Vovin, who noted that Japonic languages were spoken in the Tamna Kingdom on modern-day Jeju before the arrival of Koreanic, noting the presence of a Japonic substratum in the Jeju language.

Wooden tablets dated to the late Paekche era have been discovered by archaeologists, and some of them involve the rearrangement of Classical Chinese words according to native syntax. From this data, the word order of Paekche appears to have been similar to that of Old Korean. However, no uncontroversial evidence of non-Chinese grammatical morphemes has been found. Compared to Silla tablets, Paekche tablets are far more likely to employ conventional Classical Chinese syntax and vocabulary without any native influence. Buddhism, a religion originating in what is now India, was transmitted to Korea via China in the late 4th century. The Samguk yusa records the following 3 monks among first to bring the Buddhist teaching, or Dharma, to Korea: Malananta (late 4th century) – an Indian Buddhist monk who brought Buddhism to Paekche in the southern Korea, Sundo – a Chinese Buddhist monk who brought Buddhism to Goguryeo in northern Korea and Ado monk who brought Buddhism to Silla in central Korea.

Paekche artists adopted many Chinese influences and synthesized them into a unique artistic tradition. Buddhist themes are extremely strong in Paekche artwork. The beatific Baekje smile found on many Buddhist sculptures expresses the warmth typical of Paekche art. Taoist influences are also widespread. Chinese artisans were sent to the kingdom by the Liang dynasty in 541, and this may have given rise to an increased Chinese influence in the Sabi period.

The tomb of King Muryeong (501–523), although modeled on Chinese brick tombs and yielding some imported Chinese objects, also contained many funerary objects of the Paekche tradition, such as the gold crown ornaments, gold belts, and gold earrings. Mortuary practices also followed the unique tradition of Paekche. This tomb is seen as a representative tomb of the Ungjin period.

Delicate lotus designs of the roof-tiles, intricate brick patterns, curves of the pottery style, and flowing and elegant epitaph writing characterize Paekche culture. The Buddhist sculptures and refined pagodas reflect religion-inspired creativity. A splendid gilt-bronze incense burner (백제금동대형노, Baekje Geumdong Daehyeongno) excavated from an ancient Buddhist temple site at Neungsan-ri, Buyeo County, exemplifies Paekche art.

Little is known of Paekche music, but local musicians were sent with tribute missions to China in the 7th century, indicating that a distinctive musical tradition had developed by that time.

== Foreign relations ==
=== Relations with China ===
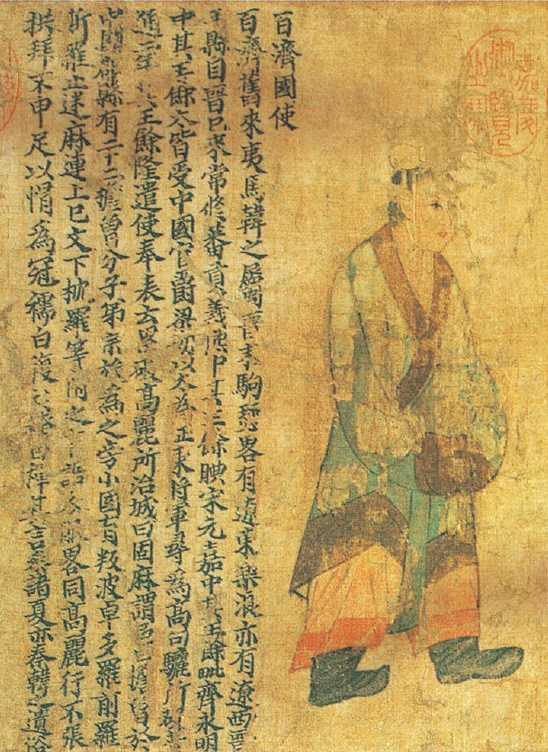
Ambassador of Paekche at the Chinese court of Emperor Yuan of Liang in his capital Jingzhou in 516–520 CE, with explanatory text. Portraits of Periodical Offering of Liang, 11th century Song copy.

In 372, King Geunchogo paid tribute to the Jin dynasty of China, located in the basin of the Yangtze River. After the fall of Jin and the establishment of Song dynasty in 420, Paekche sent envoys seeking cultural goods and technologies.

Paekche sent an envoy to Northern Wei of Northern Dynasties for the first time in 472, and King Gaero asked for military aid to attack Goguryeo. Kings Muryeong and Seong sent envoys to Liang several times and received titles of nobility.

Tomb of King Muryeong is built with bricks according with Liang's tomb style.

=== Relations with Japan ===
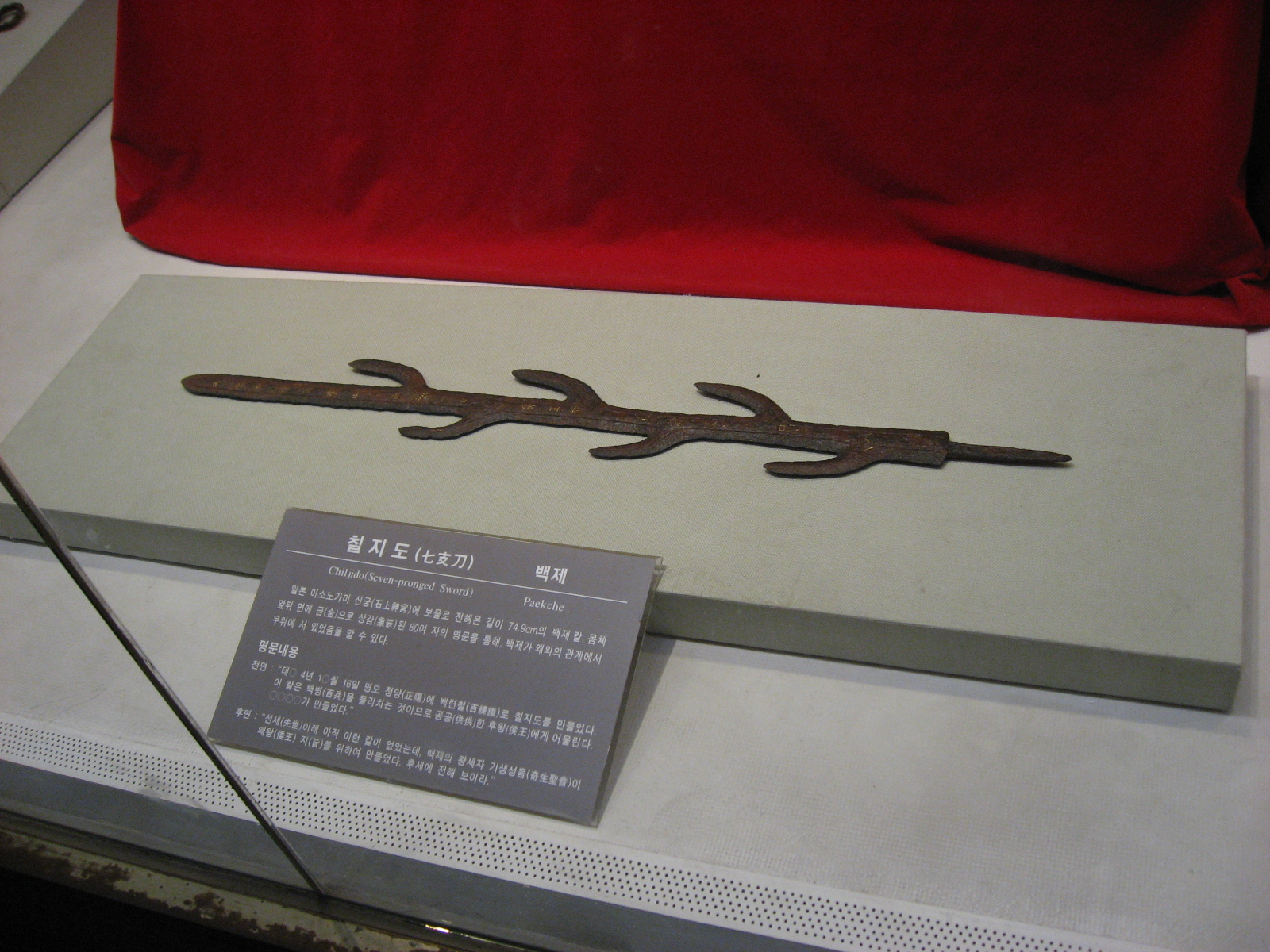
Replica of the Seven-pronged Sword Paekche gave to Yamato

==== Cultural impact and military assistance ====
To confront the military pressure of Goguryeo to its north and Silla to its east, Paekche (Kudara in Japanese) established close relations with Japan. According to the Korean chronicle Samguk sagi, Paekche and Silla sent some princes to the Japanese court as hostages. Whether the princes sent to Japan should be interpreted as diplomats as part of an embassy or literal hostages is debated. Due to the confusion on the exact nature of this relationship (the question of whether the Paekche Koreans were family or at least close to the Japanese Imperial line or whether they were hostages) and the fact that the Nihon Shoki, a primary source of material for this relationship, is a compilation of myth, makes it difficult to evaluate. The Samguk sagi, which also documents this, can also be interpreted in various ways and at any rate it was rewritten in the 13th century, easily seven or eight centuries after these particular events took place. Adding to the confusion is the discovery (in Japan) that the "Inariyama sword, as well as some other swords discovered in Japan, utilized the Korean 'Idu' system of writing". The swords "originated in Paekche and that the kings named in their inscriptions represent Paekche kings rather than Japanese kings". The techniques for making these swords were the apparently similar to styles from Korea, specifically from Paekche. In Japan, the hostage interpretation is dominant.

Other historians, such as those who collaborated on 'Paekche of Korea and the Origin of Yamato Japan' and Jonathan W. Best, who helped translate what was left of the Paekche annals, have noted that these princes set up schools in Yamato Japan and took control of the Japanese naval forces during the war with Goguryeo, taking this as evidence of them being more along the lines of diplomats with some kind of familial tie to the Japanese imperial family and as evidence against any hostage status.

As is with many long-histories and competing records, very little can be definitively concluded. Further research has been difficult, in part due to the 1976 restriction on the study of royal tombs in Japan (to include tombs such as the Gosashi tomb, which is allegedly the resting place of Empress Jingū). Prior to 1976, foreign researchers did have access, and some found Korean artifacts in Japanese dig sites. Recently in 2008, Japan has allowed controlled limited access to foreign archaeologists, but the international community still has many unanswered questions. National Geographic has written that Japan "the agency has kept access to the tombs restricted, prompting rumors that officials fear excavation would reveal bloodline links between the "pure" imperial family and Korea – or that some tombs hold no royal remains at all."

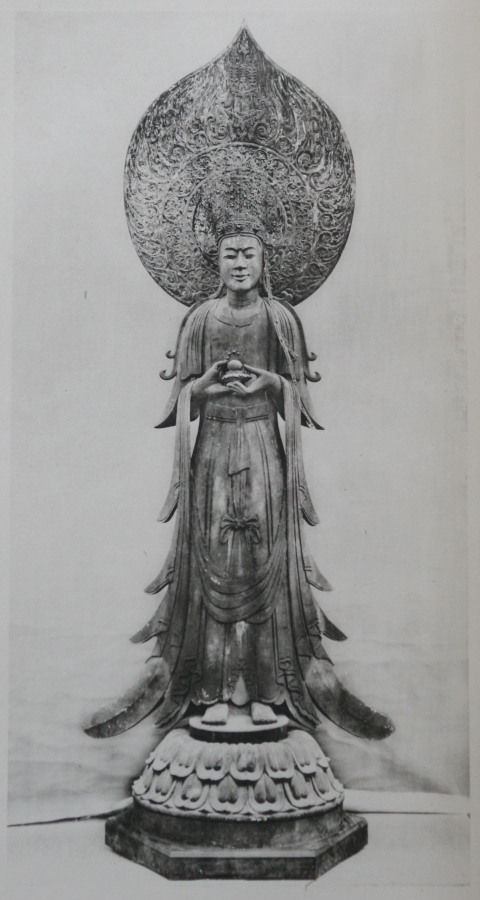
Guze Kannon is a buddhist statue made in the image of King Seong (Note: 聖冏抄 ... 故威德王恋慕父王状所造顕之尊像 即救世観音像是也) in the Korean style. The statue, originally come from Paekche, is kept in the Dream Hall at the Japanese temple Hōryū-ji.

In any case, these Koreans, diplomats and royal relatives or not, brought to Japan knowledge of the Chinese writing system, Buddhism, iron processing for weapons, and various other technologies. In exchange, Japan provided military support.

According to mythical accounts in the controversial Nihon Shoki, Empress Jingū extracted tribute and pledges of allegiance from the kings of Paekche, Silla, and Goguryeo. At the height of Japanese nationalism in the early 20th century, Japanese historians used these mythical accounts along with a passage in the Gwanggaeto Stele to establish ideological rationale to the imperialist outcry for invasion of Korea. Other historians have pointed out that there is no evidence of this Japanese account in any part of Korea, in addition to not being in any viable text in China or Korea. Regarding the Gwanggaeto Stele, because the lack of syntax and punctuation the text can be interpreted 4 different ways. Due to this problem in interpretation, nothing can be concluded. Also complicating the matter is that in the Nihongi a Korean named Amenohiboko is described in Nihon Shoki as a maternal predecessor of Tajima-no-morosuku (但馬諸助), This is highly inconsistent and difficult to interpret correctly.

Scholars believe that the Nihon Shoki gives the invasion date of Silla and Paekche as the late 4th century. However, by this time, Japan was a confederation of local tribes without sophisticated iron weapons, while the Three Kingdoms of Korea were fully developed centralized powers with modern iron weapons and were already utilizing horses for warfare. It is very unlikely that a developing state such as Yamato had the capacity to cross the sea and engage in battles with Paekche and Silla. The Nihon Shoki is widely regarded to be an unreliable and biased source of information on early relations with Korea, as it mixes heavy amounts of supposition and legend with facts.

Some Japanese scholars interpret the Gwanggaeto Stele, erected in 414 by King Jangsu of Goguryeo, as describing a Japanese invasion in the southern portion of the Korean peninsula. However, Mohan claims that Goguryeo fabricated the Japanese invasion in order to justify its conquest of Paekche. If this stele was a dedication to a Korean king, it can be argued that it would logically highlight Korea's conquests and not dedicate it to a strange incident regarding Japan. In any case, because of these various possible interpretations, the circumstances surrounding the stele are still highly debated and inconclusive.

Chinese scholars participated in the study of the Stele during the 1980s. Wang Jianqun interviewed local farmers and decided that no intentional fabrication occurred, adding that the lime on the Stele was pasted by local copy-making workers to enhance readability. Xu Jianxin of the Chinese Academy of Social Sciences discovered the earliest rubbed copy which was made before 1881. He also concluded that there was no evidence the Japanese had intentionally damaged any of the characters on the Stele.

Today, most Chinese and Japanese scholars contradict the conspiracy theories, based on the study of the Stele itself and advocate Japanese intervention in the era, although its size and effect are disputed.

In the project of writing a common history textbook, Kim Tae-sik of Hongik University (Korea) denied Japan's theory. But, Kōsaku Hamada of Kyushu University (Japan) reported their interpretations of the Gwanggaeto Stele text, neither of them adopting the intentionally damaged stele theory in their interpretations.

==== Fall of Paekche and military support from Japan ====
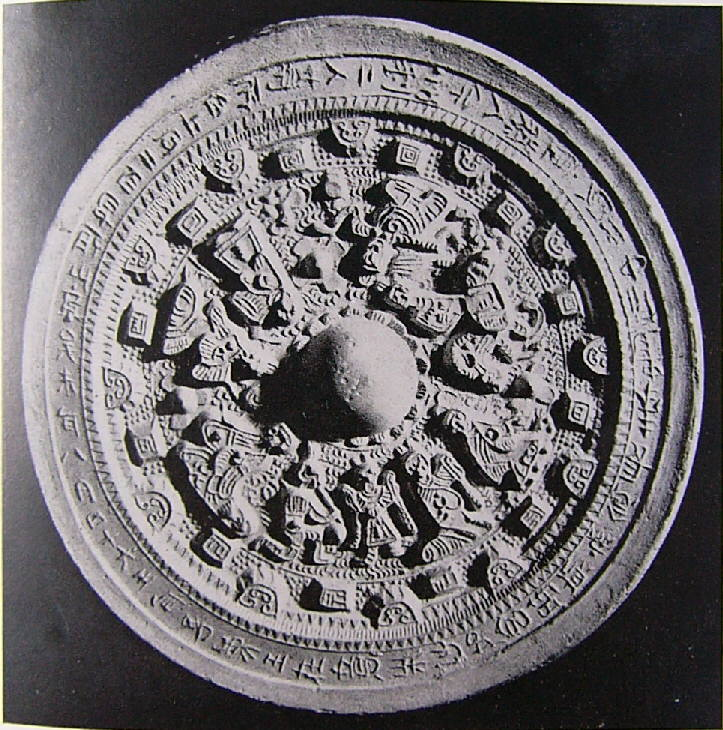
Suda Hachiman Shrine Mirror looks like mirrors of Paekche.

Some members of the Paekche nobility and royalty emigrated to Japan even before the kingdom was overthrown. In response to Paekche's request, Japan in 663 sent the general Abe no Hirafu with 20,000 troops and 1,000 ships to revive Paekche with Buyeo Pung (known in Japanese as Hōshō), a son of Uija of Paekche who had been an emissary to Japan. Around August 661, 10,000 soldiers and 170 ships, led by Abe no Hirafu, arrived. Additional Japanese reinforcement, including 27,000 soldiers led by Kamitsukeno no Kimi Wakako (上毛野君稚子) and 10,000 soldiers led by Iohara no Kimi (廬原君) also arrived at Paekche in 662.

This attempt, however, failed at the Battle of Baekgang, and the prince escaped to Goguryeo. According to the Nihon Shoki, 400 Japanese ships were lost in the battles. Only half of the troops were able to return to Japan.

The Japanese army retreated to Japan with several thousand Paekche refugees. The former royal family members were initially treated as "foreign guests" (蕃客) and were not incorporated into the political system of Japan for some time. Buyeo Pung's younger brother Seon'gwang (Zenkō in Japanese, 善光 or 禅広) used the family name Kudara no Konikishi ("King of Paekche", 百濟王; they are also called the Kudara clan, as Paekche was called Kudara in Japanese).

== Legacy ==
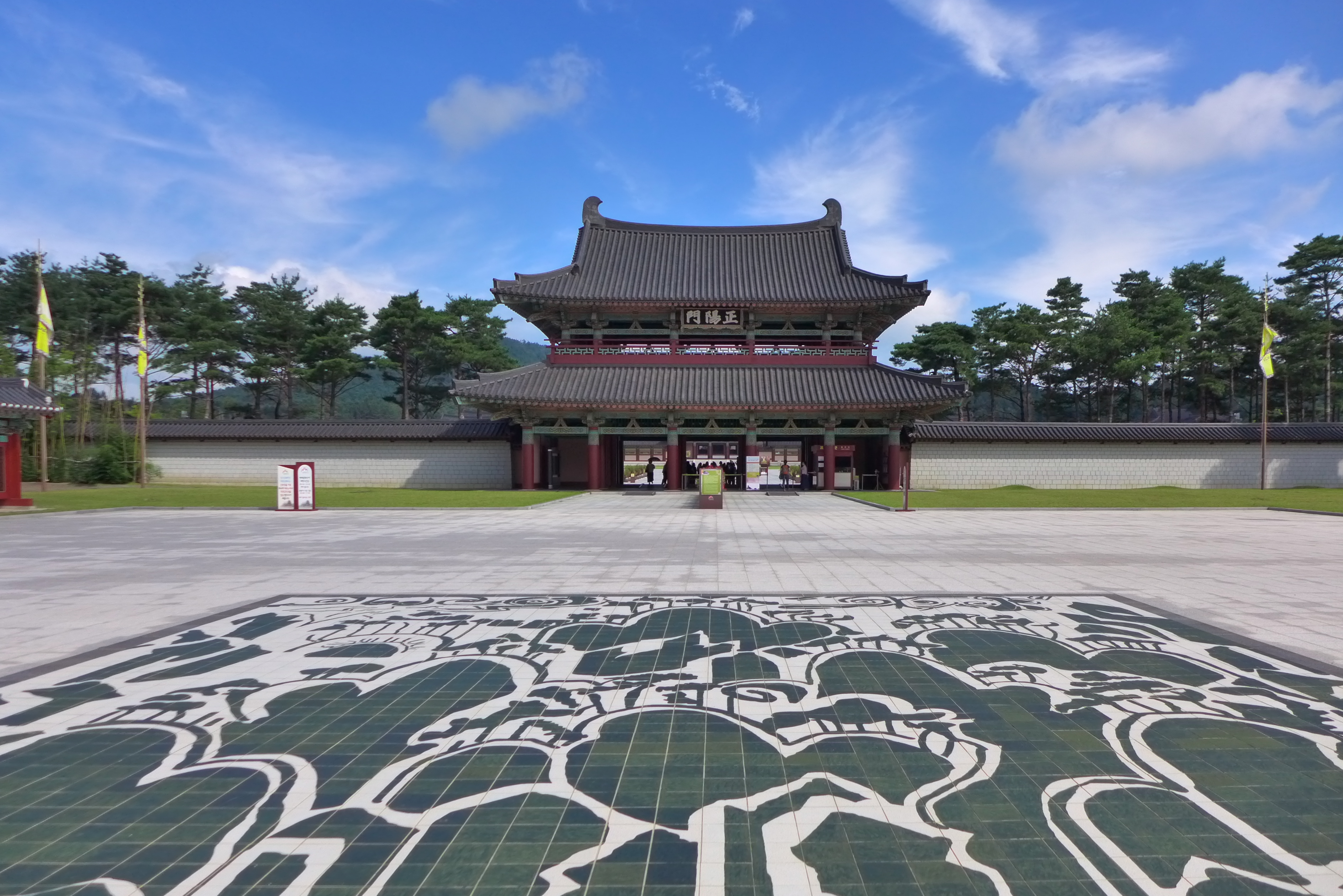
Baekje Cultural Land

Paekche was briefly revived in the Later Three Kingdoms of Korea period, as Unified Silla collapsed. In 892, General Kyŏn Hwŏn established Later Paekche, based in Wansan (present-day Jeonju). According to the Samguk Sagi, Kyŏn Hwŏn vowed to avenge King Uija and Paekche's defeat when he established his state and capital's location. Although Kyŏn Hwŏn rallied the Paekche people and won numerous victories against Silla and Goryeo, Later Paekche later fell in 936 to King Taejo of Goryeo.

In contemporary South Korea, Paekche relics are often symbolic of the local cultures of the southwest, especially in Chungnam and Jeolla. The gilt-bronze incense burner, for example, is a key symbol of Buyeo County, and the Paekche-era Buddhist rock sculpture of Seosan Maaesamjonbulsang is an important symbol of Seosan City.

Paekche is believed to have introduced the man'yōgana writing system to Japan, of which the modern hiragana and katakana scripts are descendants. Kojiki and the Nihon shoki both state this, and though direct evidence is hard to come by, most scholars tend to accept this idea.

On 17 April 2009, Ōuchi Kimio (大內公夫) of Ōuchi clan visited Iksan, Korea to pay tribute to his Paekche ancestors. The Ōuchi are descendants of Prince Imseong.

In 2010, Baekje Cultural Land was opened to visitors. The theme park aims to preserve Paekche architecture and culture.

Baekje Historic Areas, which feature locations with remains of the period, was designated a UNESCO World Heritage Site in 2015.

== See also ==
- Crown of Baekje
- Kudara no Konikishi clan
- Creation myth of Paekche
- List of Paekche people
- List of Baekje monarchs

== Bibliography ==
- Best, Jonathan W. (2007). A History of the Early Korean Kingdom of Paekche, together with an annotated translation of "The Paekche Annals" of the "Samguk sagi". Harvard East Asian Monographs. Massachusetts: Harvard University, Asia studies.
- Brown, Delmer M., ed. (1993). The Cambridge History of Japan. Cambridge University Press. ISBN 9780521223522.
- Ebrey, Patricia Buckley; Walthall, Anne & Palais, James B. (2006). East Asia: A Cultural, Social, and Political History. Houghton Mifflin. ISBN 9780618133840.
- Ebrey, Patricia Buckley; Walthall, Anne & Palais, James B. (2013). East Asia: A Cultural, Social, and Political History. Vol. I: To 1800. Cengage Learning. ISBN 978-1111808150. Archived from the original on 3 December 2016.
- Il-yeon (2006) [1281]. Samguk Yusa: Legends and History of the Three Kingdoms of Ancient Korea. Vol. Book Two. Translated by Tae-Hung Ha & Grafton K. Mintz. Silk Pagoda. ISBN 1-59654-348-5.
- Kim, Jinwung (2012). A History of Korea: From "Land of the Morning Calm" to States in Conflict. Indiana University Press. ISBN 0253000246.
- Kōzō, Yamamura (1997). The Cambridge history of Japan. John Whitney Hall. Cambridge University Press. ISBN 0-521-22354-7.
- Lee, Kenneth B (1997). Korea and East Asia : the story of a Phoenix. Praeger. ISBN 0-2759-5823-X.
