= Wife of Muryeong of Baekje =

Wife of King Muryeong

- Died: 526
- Spouse: Muryeong of Baekje
- Children: Seong of Baekje

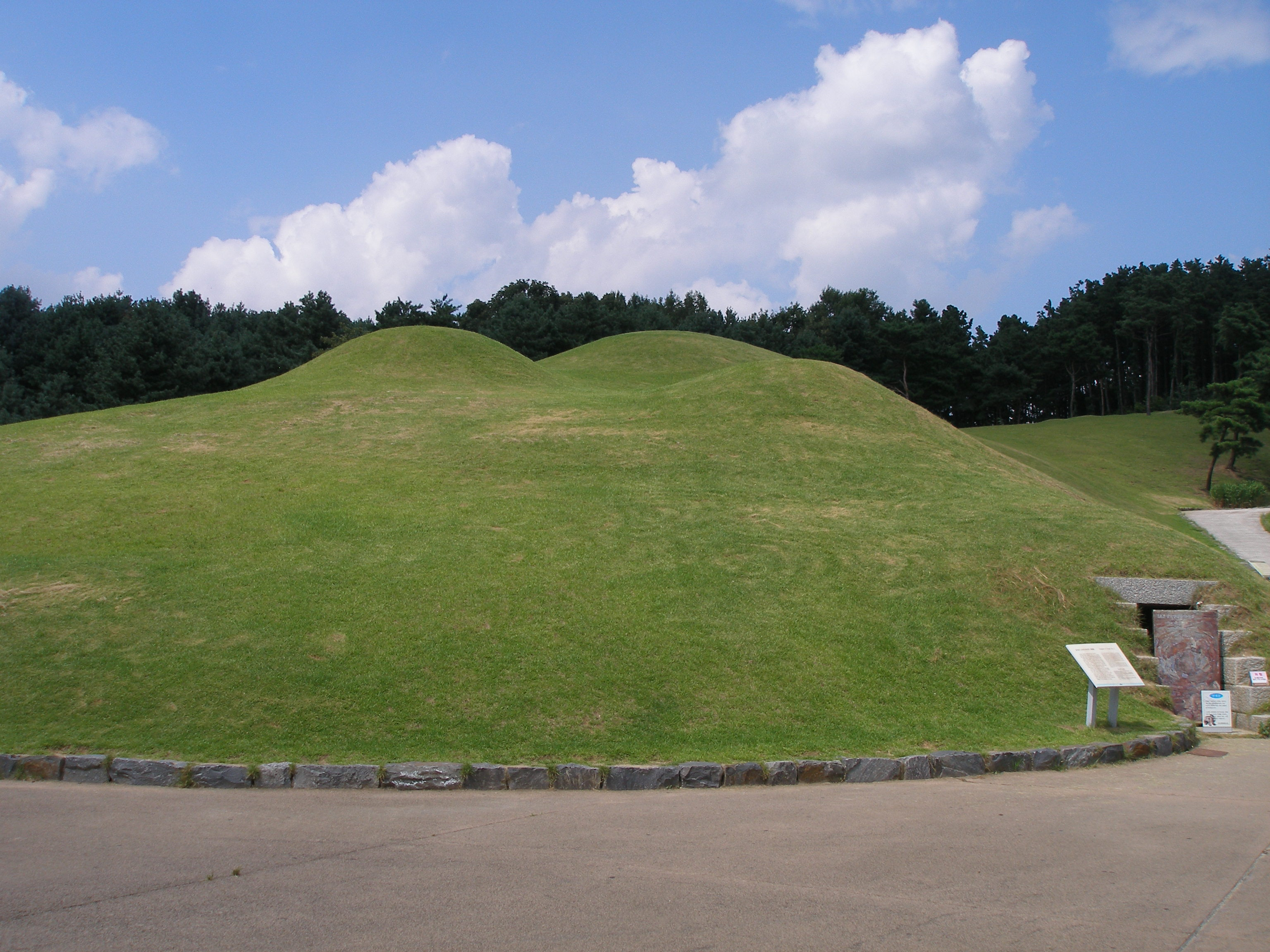
Muryeong tomb site

Grand Lady (Korean: 대부인; Hanja: 大夫人; died 526) or known as Wife of King Muryeong (무령왕대부인; 武寧王大夫人), was a Baekje consort as the wife of King Muryeong (Buyeo Sama) and the mother of his successor, King Seong (Buyeo Myeongnong). She was honoured as the Consort Dowager (왕태비; 태비; 王太妃; 太妃) during her son's reign.

She was also known as Queen Consort Muryeong (무령왕비; 武寧王妃; lit. Consort of the Martial and Serene King) since her coffin was found next to King Muryeong's. Although she was buried along with her husband in the "King Muryeong Tomb" (무령왕릉), but there are no evidence to proof if she was his primary wife or consort. Queen Muryeong's gold earrings and silver bracelet with her title–Grand Lady, engraved in Chinese characters were found. She was said to have died at a very old age since there is a phrase that said "Consort Dowager of Baekje Kingdom had a natural death" (백제국 왕태비 수종; 百濟國 王太妃 壽終).

In King Muryeong Tomb too, she was presumed to have died in 12th months 526 (in Lunar calendar) and might be temporarily buried in the current tomb's west or southwest side before later moved to Muryeong's tomb site.

== See also ==
- Muryeong of Baekje
- Seong of Baekje
- Tomb of King Muryeong
