= Seoksu =

Traditional animal statues in Korea

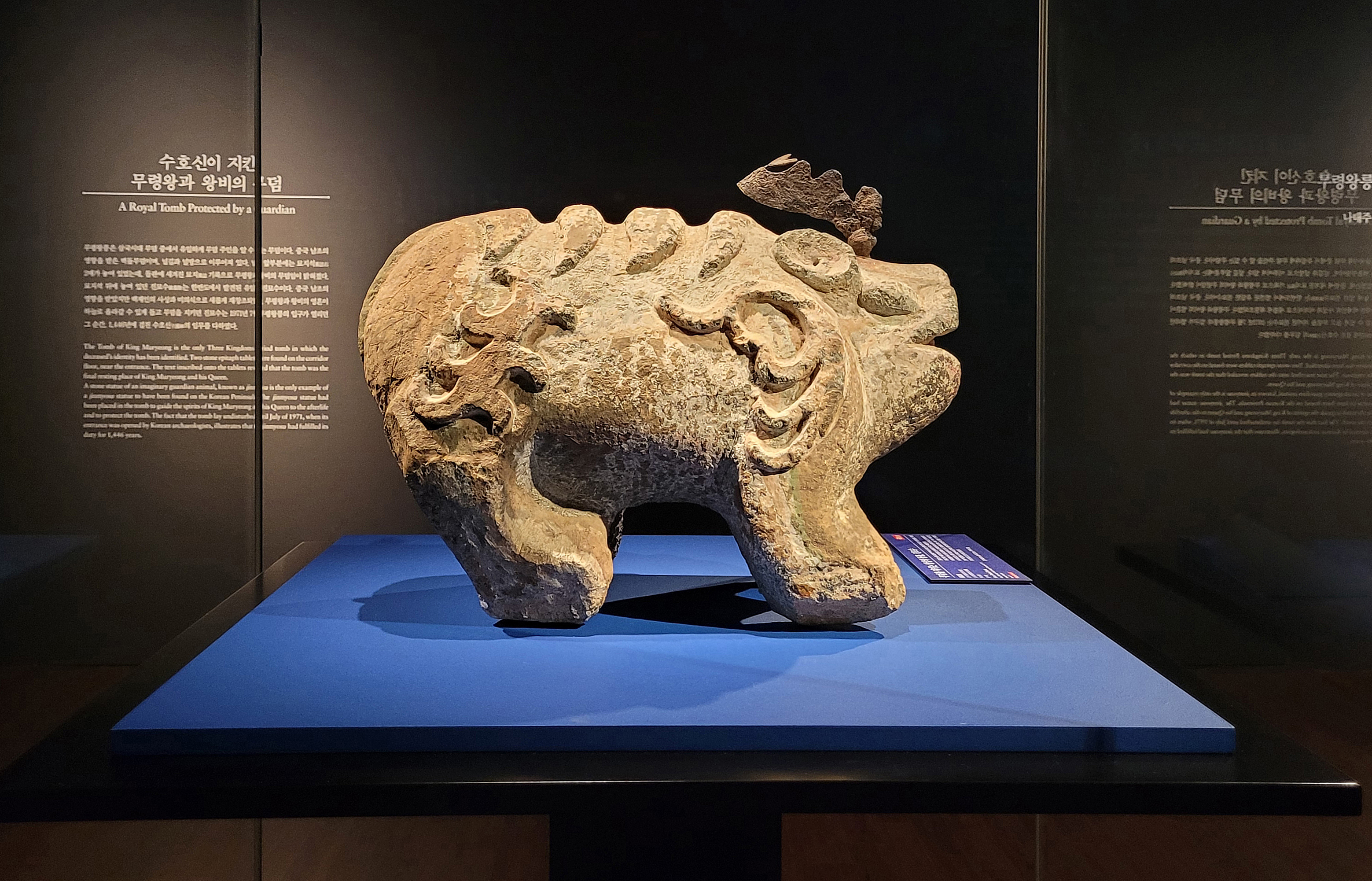
A seoksu at the Gongju National Museum.

Seoksu (Korean: 석수; Hanja: 石獸) are traditional Korean statues of beast, placed at or within a tomb or palace. This kind of protective stone animal originated from the funeral customs of the Eastern Han dynasty. Seoksu could also be placed in the pile of the stone and rubble used to surround the tomb and can be found carved on the bases of pagodas.

== Types ==
Stone animal statues, named seongmul (석물; 石物) came in various forms, including but not limited to lions, horses, oxen, elephants, pigs, tigers or the mythical animal haetae.

== King Muryong's tomb ==
One such figure was found in the center aisle of the tomb of King Muryeong. It is 30.8 centimetres (12.1 in) in height, 48 centimetres (19 in) in length, and 22 centimetres (8.7 in) in width. The animal is somewhat realistic, depicting a tail and anus. However, a steel horn shaped like a leaf and flame patterns depicting wings which run from the left and right of the body and on the legs show that it is not based on a real creature. The seoksu has a blunt mouth and a big nose without nostrils. The mouth has remnants of red paint on it, suggesting that the figure was once brightly painted.

Although this seoksu is of a lower quality than some of the other treasures found within the tomb, it is especially valuable because it is the first stone figure excavated buried with Baekje kings.

The figure is the 162nd National Treasure of Korea and was designated by the South Korean government on July 9, 1974. It is currently held in the Gongju National Museum.

== See also ==
- Tomb of King Muryeong
- National treasures of Korea
- National treasures of North Korea
