= Takano no Niigasa =

Japanese concubine

Takano no Niigasa (高野 新笠; c. 720 – 790) was a concubine of Emperor Kōnin of Japan and the mother of Emperor Kanmu. Her full name was Takano no Asomi Niigasa (高野朝臣 新笠).

== Life ==
Niigasa was a daughter of Yamato no Ototsugu (和乙継) who was a descendant of Prince Junda (c. 480–513). Prince Junda, the second son of King Muryeong of Baekje, was born in Japan and eventually became the ancestor of later known to be Yamato clan. Her mother was known to be Haji no Sukune Maimo (土師宿禰 真妹), whose surname is later, also known be Oe no Asomi (大枝朝臣). She became a concubine of Prince Shirakabe, grandson of Emperor Tenji, and bore Prince Yamabe in 737 and Prince Sawara in 750. Prince Shirakabe was married to Princess Inoe, a daughter of Emperor Shōmu in 744. When Empress Kōken died in 770, Shirakabe was appointed her successor and acceded to the throne as Emperor Kōnin. Princess Inoe and her son, Prince Osabe, were nominated as the Empress and the crown prince respectively, because of her noble birth.

The sons of Niigasa had not been considered to be successors until 772, when the Empress (Inoe) was suddenly stripped of her rank following accusations that she had cursed the Emperor. The crown prince, her son, was also disinherited. They were dead two years later. Subsequently, Niigasa's son Prince Yamabe was appointed as the crown prince and acceded to the throne as Emperor Kanmu.

== Legacy ==
In 2001, Emperor Akihito told reporters:

I, on my part, feel a certain kinship with Korea, given the fact that it is recorded in the Chronicles of Japan that the mother of Emperor Kammu [Niigasa] was one of the descendant of King Muryong of Baekje.

— Emperor Akihito

It was the first time that a Japanese emperor publicly referred to Korean blood in the imperial line.

In the same year, the Imperial Household Agency released an official statement that included Emperor Akihito's message in which he mentions Takano no Niigasa.

日本と韓国との人々の間には，古くから深い交流があったことは，日本書紀などに詳しく記されています。韓国から移住した人々や，招へいされた人々によって，様々な文化や技術が伝えられました。宮内庁楽部の楽師の中には，当時の移住者の子孫で，代々楽師を務め，今も折々に雅楽を演奏している人があります。こうした文化や技術が，日本の人々の熱意と韓国の人々の友好的態度によって日本にもたらされたことは，幸いなことだったと思います。日本のその後の発展に，大きく寄与したことと思っています。私自身としては，桓武天皇の生母が百済の武寧王の子孫であると，続日本紀に記されていることに，韓国とのゆかりを感じています。武寧王は日本との関係が深く，この時以来，日本に五経博士が代々招へいされるようになりました。また，武寧王の子，聖明王は，日本に仏教を伝えたことで知られております。

しかし，残念なことに，韓国との交流は，このような交流ばかりではありませんでした。このことを，私どもは忘れてはならないと思います。

It is said that the Japanese and Koreans had a deep connection according to the Nihon Shoki and other historical texts. Many cultural elements were introduced by immigrants and official envoys. Many musicians within the Imperial Household Agency descend from these immigrants and continue to play Gagaku to this day. This cultural exchange, in addition to the warm reception from Koreans bring joy to me. It is a step for the greater future of Japan. I, myself am glad of that fact that Emperor Kanmu's mother [Niigasa] descended from Muryeong of Baekje according to the Shoku Nihongi and feel a special connection with Korea. Muryeong has deep connection with Japan and even invited doctors to Japan in his reign. It is also said that Seong of Baekje introduced Buddhism to Japan as well.

However unfortunately, these were not the only exchange Japan had with Korea. We must not forget this fact.

— Emperor Akihito, Imperial Household Agency, Excerpt from 125th statement (December 8th 2001)
