= Jeongeupsa =

Traditional Korean folk song from the Baekje era

- Hangul: 정읍사
- Hanja: 井邑詞
- RR: Jeongeupsa
- MR: Chŏngŭpsa

Jeongeupsa (Korean: 정읍사; Hanja: 井邑詞, lit. "The Song of Jeongeup") is the only surviving gayo (가요) song from the Baekje kingdom.

Jeongeupsa is the oldest song recorded in Hangul, and is thought to be a popular folk song originating sometime after the rule of King Gyeongdeok of Silla. It was later used as court music during the Goryeo and Joseon dynasties.

== Background ==
Although not mentioned in the original composition, the title and commentary were recorded in "Akhak gwebeom" in the Goryeosa, although the lyrics themselves were not. The author and exact date of composition are both unknown, although the song is believed to have been written during the mid-7th century CE, and set to music sometime during the Goryeo era, likely during the 10th century CE. The lyrics were only recorded during the Joseon period; accordingly, the original lyrics likely differ significantly.

Reportedly, the song derives from a legend of a man from Changsha (now in the Haeri region of Gochang County, South Jeolla Province) who departed for military service and did not return for a long time, so his wife climbed Seonunsan to watch for him, and composed and sang the song. Another version of the legend say that the man was a peddler who went out to sell his wares and did not return, so his wife climbed the cliff and sang a prayer to the moon that it would light her husband's path back home. It is also said that a Mong Fu Shek can now be found in the place where the woman waited for her husband.

== Lyrics ==
Lee Chang-guy wrote:

"Jeongeupsa," the only surviving gayo (poetic song) from the Baekje period, starts with the line, "Oh, moon, up so high in the sky." Popular through the Goryeo and Joseon periods, it was sung, according to the "History of Goryeo," by the wife of a peddler as she waited for her husband who had gone to market to sell his wares. She went up on a rock and asked the moon to shine its light around so that her husband would not come to harm on his way back home. To commemorate this song, the municipal orchestra of Jeongeup city, in North Jeolla Province, holds various traditional Korean music performances every month around the time of the full moon.

The lyrics describe the woman's concern for her husband, praying to the moon to shine brighter and higher in the sky to light the way for her husband's safe return.

달하 노피곰 도다샤 / Moon, rise high up,

어긔야 머리곰 비취오시라 / And beam far away.

어긔야 어강됴리 / Eogui ya eogangdyoli,
아흐 아으 다롱디리 / Aheu a-eu darong diri.

져재 녀러신고요 / In the market, I fear,
어긔야 즌디랄 드리욜셰라 / You may step on mud.

어긔야 어강됴리 / Eogui ya eogangdyoli.

어느이다 노코시라 / Lay all down, I fear,
어긔야 내가논대 졈그랄 셰라 / Dark may fall on you.

어긔야 어강됴리 / Eogui ya eogangdyoli,
아으 다롱디리 / Ah-eu darong diri.

== In popular culture ==
Crossover vocal group Forestella used the poem on their second album, Mystique, in their song titled Dear Moon.

The song is also used as an OST soundtrack of Korean historical drama series called The King's Daughter, Soo Baek-hyang, sang by Seo Hyun-jin featuring Kim Nani and for pop version, sang by Lee Sang Eun.
