= Yamato clan =

Yamato clan may refer to:

- Yamato no Fuhito clan, an immigrant clan founded by Wani that originates from Baekje (Korea)
- Yamato no Aya clan, an immigrant clan that originates from Baekje (Korea)
- Yamato no Kuni no Miyatsuko, the local governing clan of the Yamato Province
- Yamato people
- Imperial House of Japan, also known as the House of Yamato or Yamato Dynasty
