= Prince Junda =

6th century Korean Japanese prince

- Hangul: 순타태자
- Hanja: 純陁太子
- RR: Sunta taeja
- MR: Sunt'a t'aeja

Prince Junda (純陁太子, Junda Taishi; ? – August 513?) was a member of the royal family of Baekje. He was a son of King Muryeong and the founder of the Yamato clan (和氏) (Takano clan (高野氏)) in Japan. Taishi (太子) of Junda Taishi is a title meaning Crown Prince, and Junda is the name.

== Biography ==
According to the Shoku Nihongi (797), Prince Junda was a son of King Muryeong, but his name cannot be found in Korean historical records. The Baekje's Records in the Samguk sagi (1145) mentions only King Seong as the son of King Muryeong. In the Samguk yusa (late 13th century), too, only King Seong is mentioned as a son of King Muryeong, and Prince Junda is not mentioned.

In the August section of the 7th year of Emperor Keitai's reign in Nihon Shoki (Chronicles of Japan, 720), there is an entry that states "Junda (淳陀), a prince of Baekje, died," (Note: The original text is "秋八月癸未朔戊申、百濟太子淳陀薨.") leading some to believe that Junda (純陀) and Junda (淳陀) were the same person.

Since the 7th year of Emperor Keitai is thought to be 513 A.D., and the year of King Muryeong's death is known to be 523 from a tombstone excavated from his tomb, Junda (純陀) and Junda (淳陀) may be the same person since they have the same Japanese pronunciation, although they use different Chinese characters.

The Nihon Shoki does not mention where Prince Junda died, but some researchers believe he died in Japan. In the April section of the 7th year (505?) of Emperor Buretsu in the Nihon Shoki, there is a description of Siga-kishi (斯我君), "a member of the family of the Lord of Baekje," who was sent from Baekje.

Shiga-kishi served the Japanese Imperial Court, and his son Hōshi-kishi (法師君) is described as the founder of the Yamato clan (倭君), leading some to speculate that Shiga-kishi was the same person as Prince Junda.

== Descendants ==
According to the Shoku Nihongi, one of Emperor Kōnin's concubines, Takano no Niigasa (高野新笠, ?–790), was a descendant of Prince Junda. Takano no Niigasa gave birth to Emperor Kanmu. Her father was Yamato no Ototsugu (和乙継), but his lineage to Prince Junda is unknown.

Some researchers doubt this lineage because there is a gap of more than 200 years from Prince Junda to Takano no Niigasa, and because Prince Junda is not mentioned by that name in Korean historical documents.

In 2001, Emperor Akihito made a comment in his speech regarding the Japan-Korea co-hosting of the Soccer World Cup scheduled for 2002 that Emperor Kammu's birth mother was a descendant of King Muryeong of Baekje, in relation to the friendship between Japan and Korea. This comment did not attract much attention in Japan, but was widely reported in Korea due to political concerns.

== See also ==
- Tomb of King Muryeong
- Koreans in Japan
- Monarchs of Korea
