= Korean glass art =

Korean glass art has a long history. The earliest glass discovered so far is of the 2nd century BCE and was found in Hapsongni, in the Mahan confederacy. Also, in the Tomb of King Muryeong was found the statuine of a shaved child, maybe a buddhist monk. Recent archaeological excavations hint that as early as the 7th century Silla kingdom, glassware was made in Korea. Contemporary glass art principally divides into religious installations of stained glass windows, and glassware. Art schools have had limited success in bringing glass art up to the standards of other Korean art.

== See also ==
- Korean art
- Korean culture
- Korean sculpture
