= Muryeong of Baekje =

25th King of Baekje from 501 to 523

King Muryeong 武寧王 무령왕

King of Baekje
- Reign: 501–523
- Coronation: 501
- Predecessor: Dongseong of Baekje
- Successor: Seong of Baekje
- Born: June 25, 461/July 14, 462; Kakarajima
- Died: June 7, 523; Baekje
- Burial: Tomb of King Muryeong
Posthumous name
- King Muryeong (武寧王, 무령왕)
- Father: Dongseong of Baekje
- Mother: unknown

- Muryeong of Baekje
- Hangul: 사마, 융
- Hanja: 斯摩, 隆
- RR: Sama, Yung
- MR: Sama, Yung

Monarch name
- Hangul: 무령왕
- Hanja: 武寧王
- RR: Muryeongwang
- MR: Muryŏngwang

Muryeong (461/462–523) was the 25th king of Baekje, one of the Three Kingdoms of Korea, reigning from 501 to 523. During his reign, Baekje remained allied with Silla against Goguryeo, and expanded its relationships with China and Japan. According to Samguk sagi, he was 8 cheok tall, kind and generous, whom people followed naturally.

== Background ==
The Tomb of King Muryeong calls him King Sama (斯麻), and records his birth year as 462. King surname is Mu.

The Samguk sagi calls him King Muryeong, with the personal name (휘) of Sama (斯摩). He is described as the second son of the 24th king Dongseong, though the Nihonshoki pertains that he was the son of Prince Gonji (곤지), and thus Dongseong's half brother. He became king when Dongseong was assassinated by the court official Baek Ga. The following year, he crushed a planned rebellion by Baek Ga.

=== Other records ===
China's Liang shu gives his surname as Yeo and personal name as Yung, and states that he restored Baekje into a strong nation.

== Reign ==
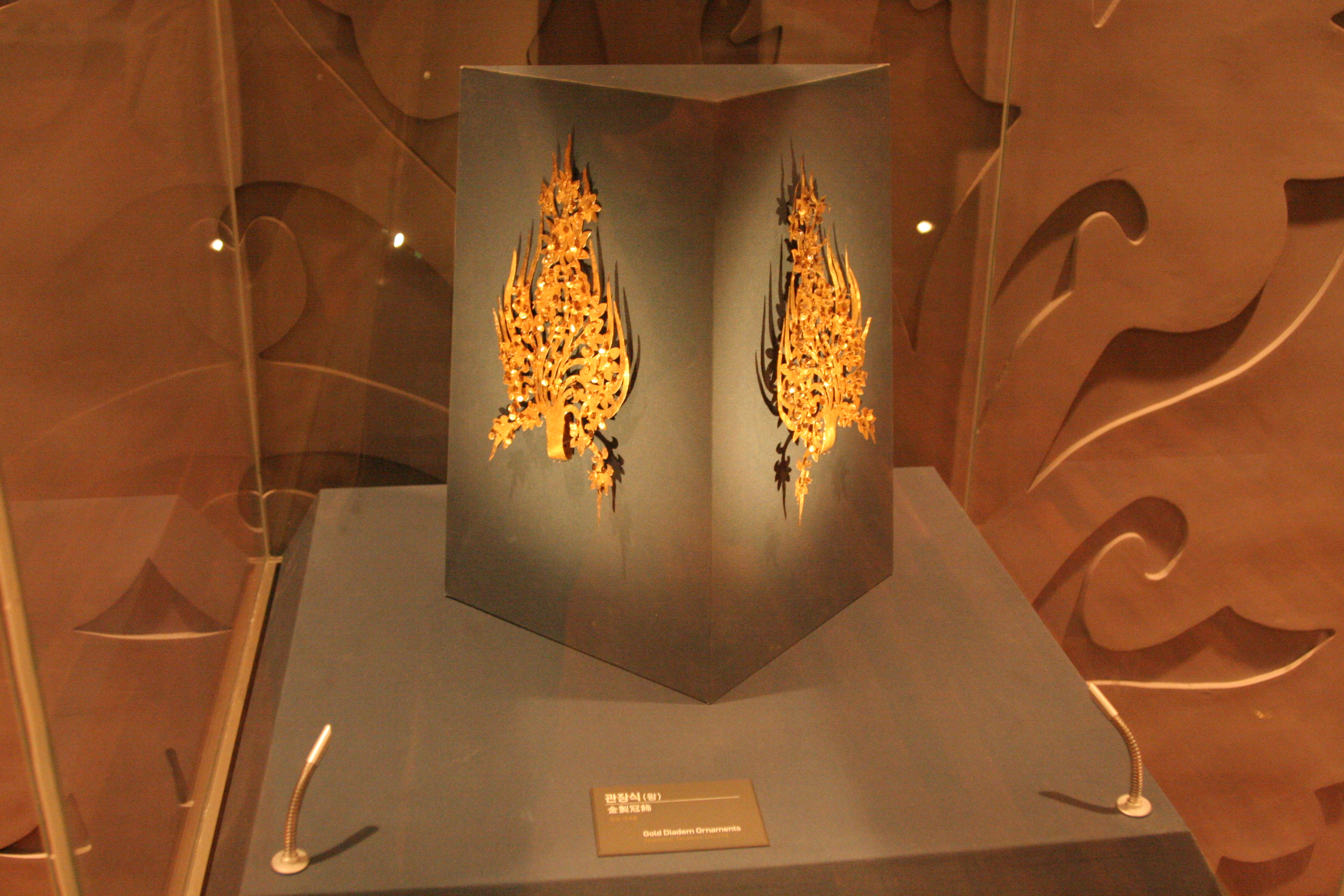
Muryeong's crown in his tomb

In 501, he sent an army to attack Goguryeo's Sugok-seong. In 503, he repelled an attack by the Mohe. In 507, he successfully countered another attack by Goguryeo and Mohe forces. In 512, Goguryeo conquered two castles, but Muryeong personally led 3,000 men to destroy the Goguryeo army. In 523, he ordered the building of a fortified wall to defend the northern border.

According to both historical and archeological sources, contact and trade between China and Baekje increased during Muryeong's reign. In 512, according to the Liang shu, Muryeong sent Baekje's first mission to the newly established court of the Chinese Liang Dynasty. A second mission was sent in 521, announcing various victories over Goguryeo. In reply, the Liang emperor bestowed various titles on him, including "Great General Tranquilizing the East (寧東大將軍)" and "King of Baekje". These titles were also found engraved on a tablet in King Muryeong's tomb.

In 503, he sent a bronze mirror, and in 513 and 516, Confucian scholars to Japan.

== Legacy ==
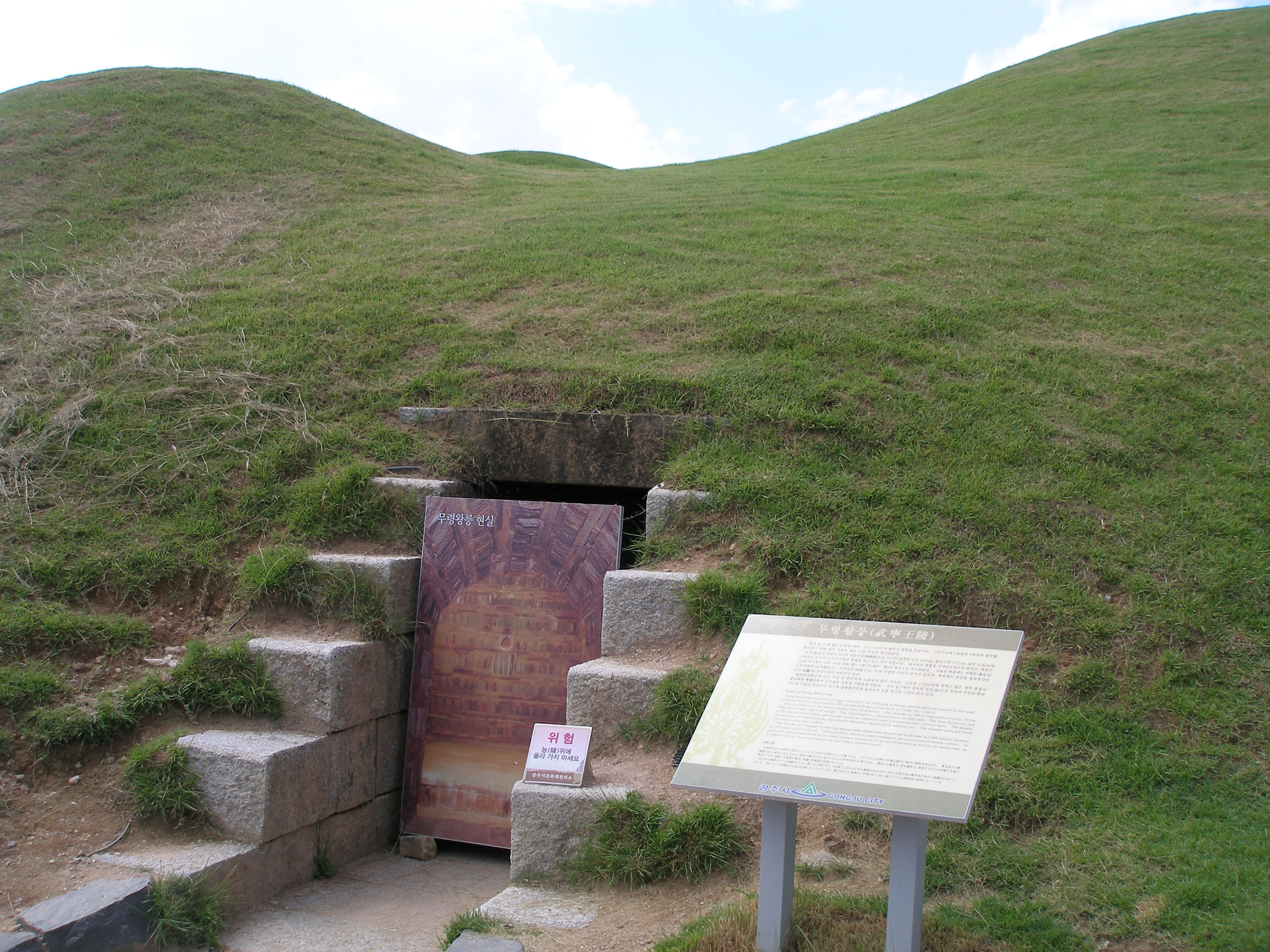
Tomb of Muryeong of Baekje

In 1971, King Muryeong's tomb was excavated in Songsan-ri, Gongju, South Korea, where he was buried with his queen.

In 2001, Japan's then emperor Akihito told reporters "I, on my part, feel a certain kinship with Korea, given the fact that it is recorded in the Chronicles of Japan that the mother of Emperor Kammu was of the line of King Muryong of Paekche." It was the first time that a Japanese emperor publicly referred to Korean blood in the imperial line. According to the Shoku Nihongi, Emperor Kanmu's mother, Takano no Niigasa (720 – 790) is a descendant of Prince Junda, son of Muryeong, who died in Japan in 513 (Nihon Shoki Chapter 17).

== Family ==
- Father: Dongseong of Baekje
- Mother: unknown
- Unnamed Queen
  - 1st son: 26th King, Seong of Baekje (聖王, ?–554) – before he was king he was known as Buyeo Myeong (扶餘明) or Buyeo Myeongnong (扶餘明禯).
  - 2nd son: Prince Junda (淳陀太子, ?–513) – known in Baekje as "Buyeo Junta", settled in Japan and became ancestor of the Yamato clan.
  - 3rd son: Shigakishi (斯我君, ?–?) – known in Baekje as Buyeo Sa'a. He was sent to Japan in 505 as a political hostage to Emperor Buretsu of Japan.

== Popular culture ==
- Portrayed by Lee Jae-ryong in the 2013 MBC TV series The King's Daughter, Soo Baek-hyang.

== See also ==
- List of monarchs of Korea
- History of Korea
- Tomb of King Muryeong

Muryeong of Baekje House of Buyeo Cadet branch of the House of Go Born: 462 Died: 523
Regnal titles
Preceded by Dongseong	King of Baekje; 501–523	Succeeded by Seong
