= Yamato no Fuhito clan =

Japanese immigrant clan with origin in Korea

Yamato no Fuhito clan 和
- Parent house: Buyeo clan (扶餘氏)
- Titles: Various
- Founder: Prince Junda
- Founding year: 6th century

The Yamato no Fuhito (和史), also known simply as Yamato clan (和氏), was an immigrant clan from Korea that was active in Japan since the Kofun period, according to the Nihon Shoki.

== History ==
They descended from Prince Junda who died in 513 in Japan. Prince Junda was supposedly a son of Mureyong, the 25th king of the Korean Kingdom of Paekche. His brother Seong became the 26th king of Paekche and his nephew Prince Imseong also settled in Japan.

The clan is best known for being the parent house of Takano no Niigasa, concubine of Emperor Kōnin and mother to Emperor Kanmu. Because of Takano no Niigasa, it became the second instance where Korean heritage was introduced into the Japanese imperial line (first being Amenohiboko).

Clan individuals claim of Korean descent, specifically of Paekche, and are believed to be related to other Paekche-originating clans such as the Kudara no Konikishi clan. In fact, Emperor Kanmu, who heavily identified himself to be of Korean, passed reform acts to incorporate more Korea-originating clans into the imperial family by stating that they were "relatives by marriage".

However, due to the fact that the Nihon Shoki contains folkloric elements, some researchers question the legitimacy of this clan's lineage as there is a gap of more than 200 years from Prince Junda to Takano no Niigasa (高野新笠, ?–790), and because Prince Junda is not mentioned in Korean historical documents. However, similar claims have been made within Shoku Nihongi in regards to the Yamato no Fuhito clan, therefore, it can be safely assumed that the ancestry (or at least the legend behind it) can be deemed plausible.

== Name ==
The name fuhito comes from their occupation as scribes.

Though the name "Yamato (和)" may be confused with the imperial house which uses the same name, the etymology behind Yamato no Fuhito clan's use of Yamato stems from the name of the capital at the time. Therefore, "Yamato no Fuhito" most likely meant "Scribes clan in the capital".

== Legacy ==
With the 2002 FIFA World Cup coming, an event hosted by Japan and South Korea, Emperor Akihito told reporters "I, on my part, feel a certain kinship with Korea, given the fact that it is recorded in the Chronicles of Japan that the mother of Emperor Kammu [Niigasa] was of the line of King Muryong of Paekche." According to the Shoku Nihongi, Niigasa was a descendant of Prince Junda, son of Muryeong.

It was the first time that a reigning Japanese emperor himself mentioned Korean blood in the imperial line, although it was nothing unknown at the time. During the Japanese Empire, the Imperial family and its connections to Korea were often used under the pretext of assimilating Koreans (see Nissen dōsoron). This was done in order to encourage Korean subjects of the Japanese Empire to embrace Japanization and the Japanese Emperor's divinity.

== Family tree ==
- King Mureyong of Baekje (武寧王) (462–523) – called Semakishi (嶋君)/King Shima (斯麻王) because he was born on the island of Kyushu.
- Prince Junda (淳陀太子) "Junda-taishi" (c. 480–513) – son of King Mureyong who settled in Japan.
- Yamato no Ototsugu (和乙継) (c. 690–?)
- Takano no Asomi Niigasa (高野新笠) (c. 720–90) – daughter of Ototsugu, concubine of Emperor Kōnin, mother of Emperor Kanmu.

== See also ==
- Toraijin
- Yamato people
- Tomb of King Muryeong
- Koreans in Japan
