= Gongju National Museum =

National museum in Gongju, South Korea

Coordinates: 36.465481°N 127.112161°E

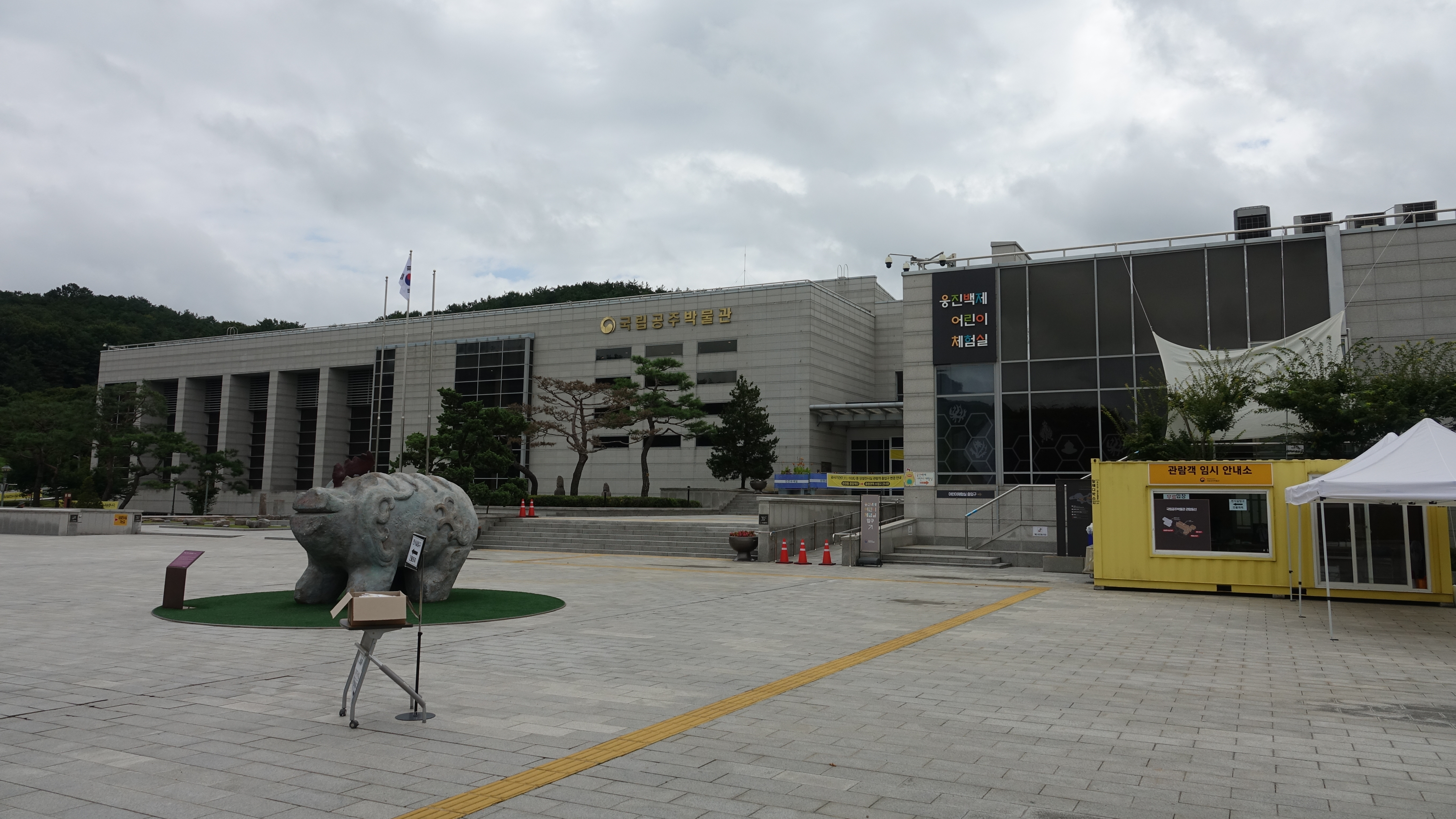

Korean name
- Hangul: 국립공주박물관
- Hanja: 國立公州博物館
- RR: Gungnip Gongju bangmulgwan
- MR: Kungnip Kongju pangmulgwan

Gongju National Museum (Korean: 국립공주박물관) is a national museum in Gongju, South Korea. The Gongju National Museum holds 10,000 artifacts including 19 national treasures and 3 treasures excavated in Daejeon and Chungcheongnam-do areas, especially artifacts from Tomb of King Muryeong.

== Gallery ==
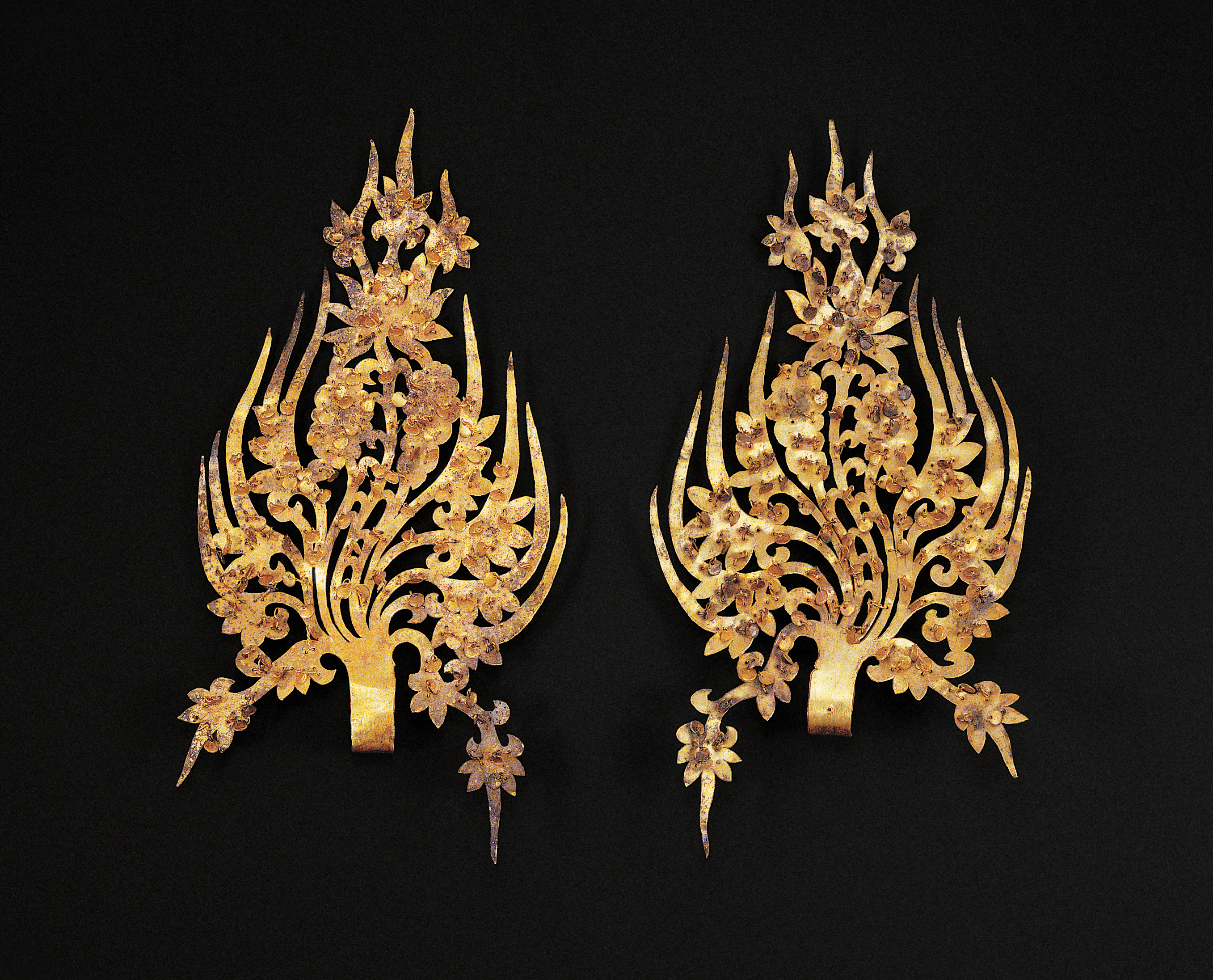
Geumje gwansik

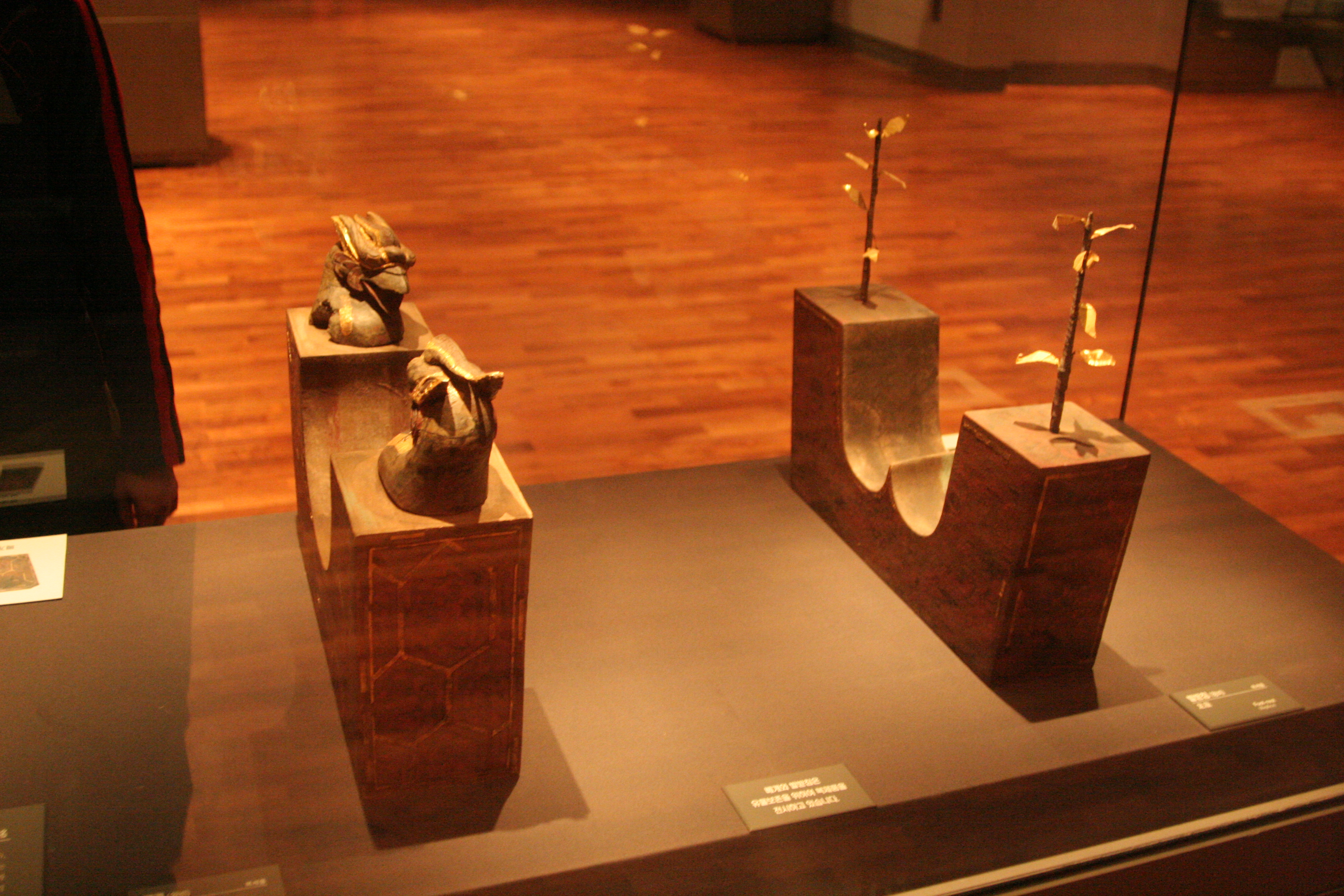
Royal foot and head rests from Tomb of King Muryeong

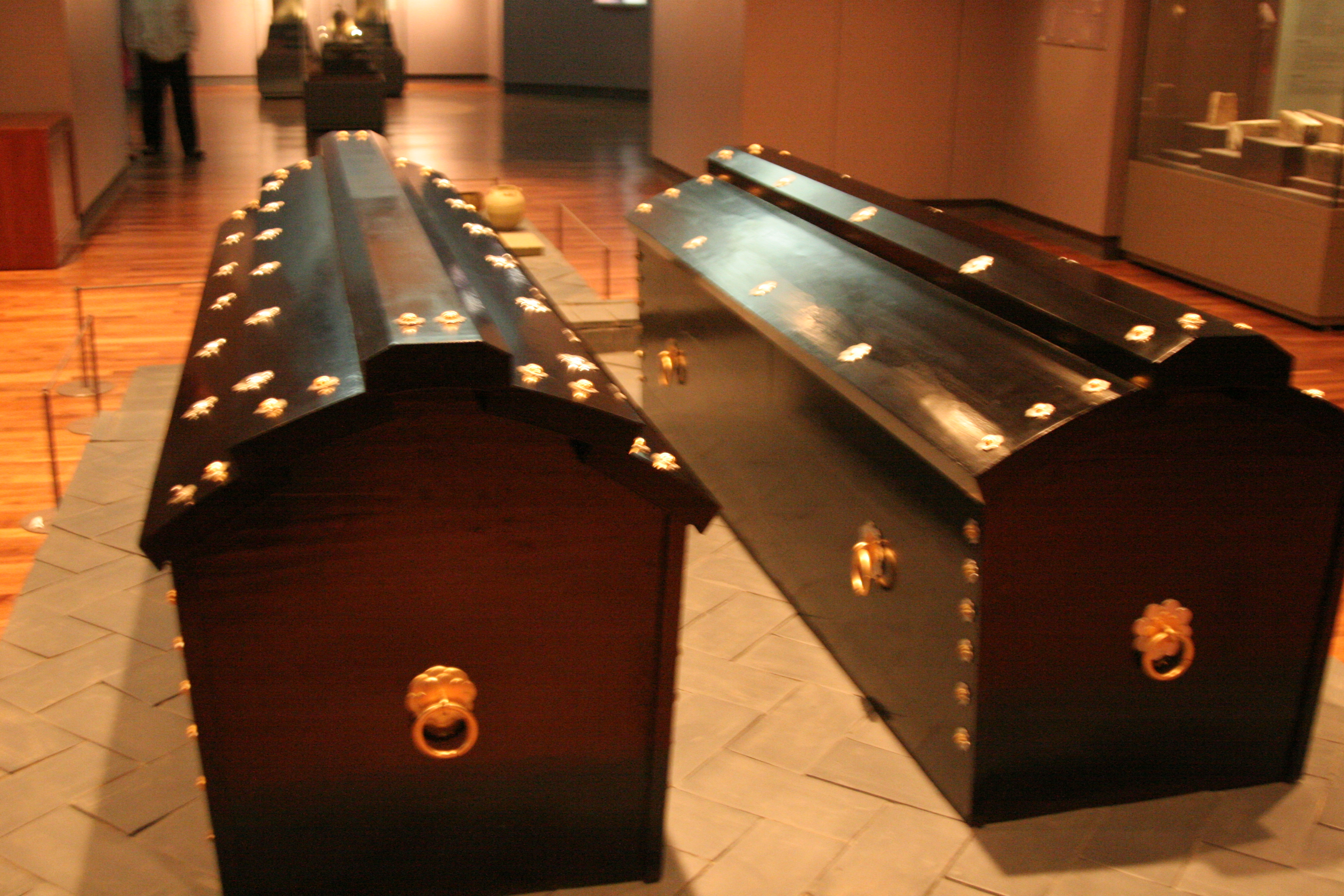

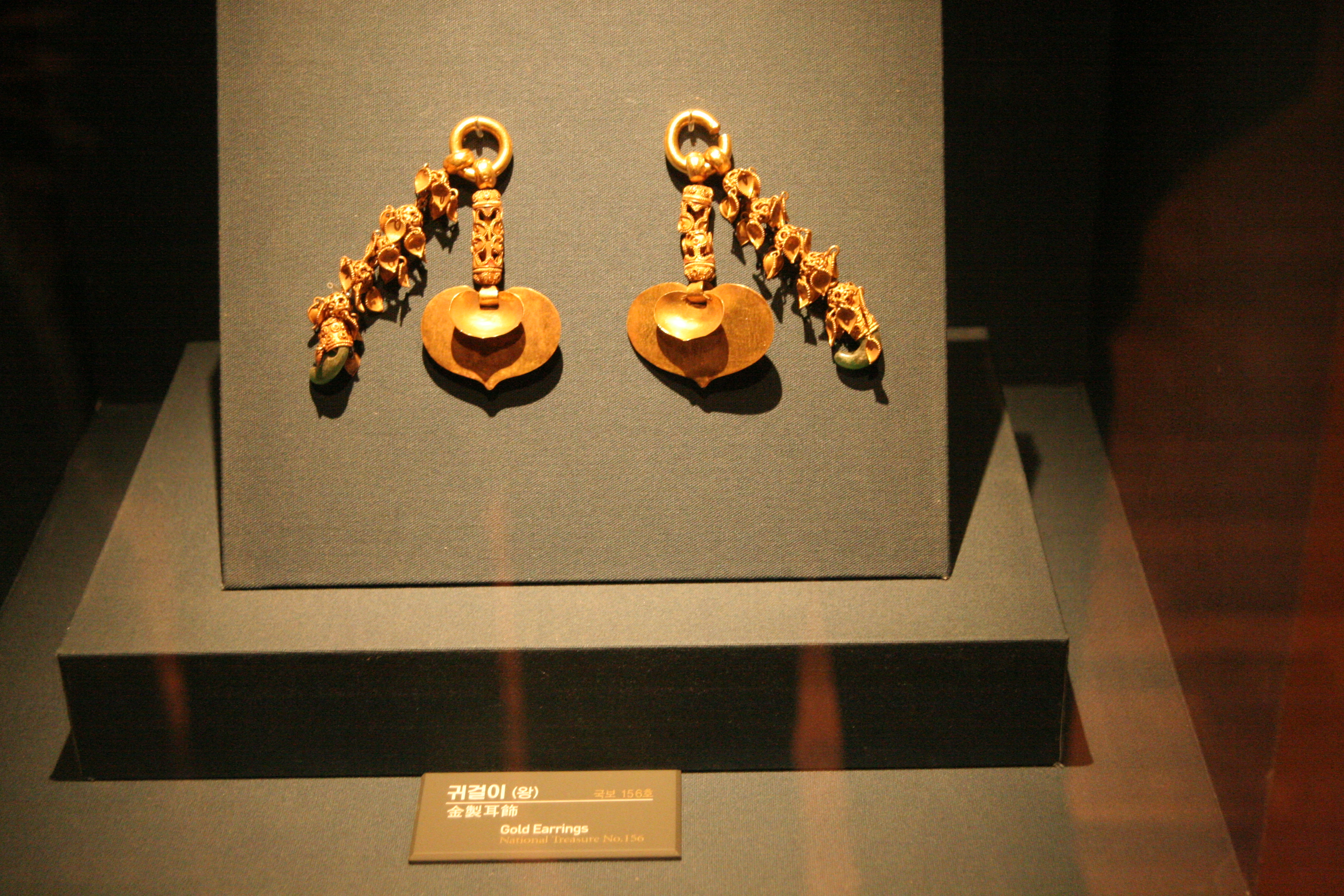
Earrings excavated from Tomb of King Muryeong

== See also ==
- List of museums in South Korea
- National museum
