= Jun Tae-soo =

South Korean actor (1984–2018)

- Born: March 4, 1984; Boryeong, South Chungcheong Province, South Korea
- Died: January 21, 2018 (aged 33); South Korea
- Cause of death: Suicide
- Education: Seowon University
- Occupation: Actor
- Years active: 2007–2013
- Agent: Haewadal Entertainment
- Family: Ha Ji-won (sister)

Korean name
- Hangul: 전태수
- Hanja: 田汰遂
- RR: Jeon Taesu
- MR: Chŏn T'aesu

Jun Tae-soo (Korean: 전태수; March 2, 1984 – January 21, 2018) was a South Korean actor. He was best known for his role on the popular 2010 television series Sungkyunkwan Scandal.

== Biography ==
Jun Tae-soo was born on March 2, 1984, in Boryeong, South Chungcheong Province, South Korea. His older sister is acclaimed South Korean actress Ha Ji-won. He studied sculpture at Seowon University.

Jun made his acting debut in 2007 and later gained popularity playing the antagonist in the hit 2010 television series Sungkyunkwan Scandal. He appeared next in the sitcom All My Love For You, but left the series in 2011 after being arrested for assaulting a taxi driver and two policemen while he was under the influence of alcohol. His last acting role was in the 2013 television series The King's Daughter, Soo Baek-hyang; he was dropped of by the label after terminating his contract, citing personal circumstances.

=== Death ===
Jun was found dead at his home on January 21, 2018, of an apparent suicide. He was being treated for depression at the time of his death.

== Filmography ==
=== Television ===
Year	Title	Role	Ref.
2007	Good Day to Love	Bae Jang-ho	
2007	Kid Gang		
2007	The King and I	Han Chi-geun	
2010	Sungkyunkwan Scandal	Ha In-soo	
2010	All My Love for You	Jeon Tae-soo	
2010	It's Okay, Daddy's Girl	Park Jong-suk	
2011	You're Here, You're Here, You're Really Here	Kim Gul-joo	
2013	Blooded Palace: The War of Flowers	Nam-hyeok	
2013	The King's Daughter, Soo Baek-hyang	Jin-mu	

=== Film ===
Year	Title	Role	Notes	Ref.
2009	The Madonna	Sung-jin	short film	
2009	K&J Fate		short film	

=== Music video appearances ===
Year	Song title	Artist	Ref.
2007	"How Are You"	Two:Some	
2011	"Don't Act Countrified"	Ali	
