= The King's Daughter, Soo Baek-hyang =

2013–2014 South Korean historical television series

- Promotional poster
- Also known as: The Daughter of the Emperor
- Hangul: 제왕의 딸 수백향
- Hanja: 帝王의 딸 手白香
- RR: Jewangui ttal Su Baekhyang
- MR: Chewangŭi ttal Su Paekhyang
- Genre: Historical period drama; Romance; Action
- Created by: Kim Jin-min
- Written by: Hwang Jin-young
- Directed by: Lee San-yeob; Choi Joon-bae
- Creative directors: Bae Jae-il (Martial director); Geum Jong-taek (Martial director); Oh Young-sam (Technical director); Ham Yoon-soo (Camera director); Jang Ik-seon (Lighting director); Ji Pyung-kwon (Music director); Lee Choong-seon (Casting director); Kim Jong-pil (Casting director)
- Starring: Seo Hyun-jin; Seo Woo; Lee Jae-ryong; Jo Hyun-jae; Jun Tae-soo
- Country of origin: South Korea
- Original language: Korean
- No. of episodes: 108

Production
- Executive producer: Kim Jin-min
- Producer: Kim Ho-joon
- Cinematography: Song In-hyuk
- Editors: Kim Soo-jin; Jeon Hyun-jung
- Camera setup: Single camera
- Running time: 35 minutes
- Production company: MBC

Original release
- Network: MBC
- Release: September 30, 2013 – March 14, 2014

The King's Daughter, Soo Baek-hyang (Korean: 제왕의 딸 수백향) is a Korean-language historical drama depicting the life of Soo Baek-hyang, the daughter of King Muryeong of Baekje. It was aired on MBC TV from September 30, 2013, to March 14, 2014, on Monday and Friday at 20:55 (KST). The series was scheduled have 120 episodes, but it was reduced to 108 on March 4, 2014.

== Plot ==
Yung is a successful general in the army of his cousin King Dongseong. He is in love with Chae-hwa, the daughter of a court official named Baek-ga. Baek-ga is committed to bringing Yung to the throne, with his daughter as the queen. When he is accused of the king's murder, the two lovers are forced apart. Chae-hwa is taken to Gaya by a servant, Goo-chun, and there she gives birth to Yung's daughter, Seol-nan. She subsequently marries the man who had saved her and, some years later, gives birth to a second child, Seol-hee. In the meantime, Yung, who believes that his lover is dead, ascends the throne as Muryeong. In an attempt to protect Jin-moo, the son of the former King Dongseong, Yung exchanges his own son, Myung-nong, for Jin-moo. Years later, simple-minded Seol-nan falls in love with Myung-nong, while her ambitious sister Seol-hee tries to become the princess.

== Cast ==
=== Main cast ===
- Seo Hyun-jin as Soo Baek-hyang / Seol-nan
- Seo Woo as Seol-hee
- Lee Jae-ryong as King Muryeong
- Jo Hyun-jae as Myung-nong, later King Seong
  - Jeon Jin-seo as teenage Myung-nong
  - Seol Woo-hyung as child Myung-nong
- Jun Tae-soo as Jin-moo
- Myung Se-bin as Chae-hwa
- Yoon Tae-young as Goo-chun

=== Supporting ===
==== Bi Moon ====
- Cha Hwa-yeon as Do-rim
- Kim Roi-ha as Ttol-dae
- Kim Min-kyo as Mang-goo
- Sung Ji-ru as Dae-woon

==== Royal palace ====
- Jung Sung-mo as Nae-sook
- Im Se-mi as Queen Eun-hye
- Hwang Young-hee as Gong-ok
- Jung Suk-yong as Hong-rim
- Lee Ki-young as King Gaero
- Jung Chan as King Dongseong

==== Extended ====
- Ahn Suk-hwan as Baek-ga
- Kim Young-jae as Soo Ni-moon
- Yeo Eui-joo as Kang-bok
- Choi Bum-ho as Yeo-mok
- Lee Hye-eun as Lady So-jung
- Kim Byeong-ok as Yeon Bool-tae
- Jeon Shin-hwan as Woo-chi
- Jang Myung-gap as Moo-baek
- Lee Dong-yoon as Yong-goo
- Choi Joon-hyuk as Kko-mak
- Lee Choong-shik as Duk-swe
- Lee Chang-jik as Choi Man-chi
- Seo Yi-sook as Mrs. Yong-goo
- Ga Deuk-hee as Na-eun
- Park Hee-jin as Mrs. Kko-mak / Inn auntie
- Woo Sang-jun as Sangjwapyeong elderly
- Song Min-hyung as Eun-sol
- Lee Mi-do as Mak-geum
- Jung Ui-kap as Eul-mil
- Moo Jin-sung as Kang Bok
- Hong Yeo-jin as Gaya Ki Moon Bureau noble's wife
- Seo Kwang-jae as Gaya Ki Moon Bureau noble
- Choi Ro-woon as orphaned boy
- Kwon Sung-guk as Baekje doctor
- Lee Jae-goo as Ki Moon Administration official
- Lee Seung-won as butler
- Ki Se-hyung as Moo-man
- Min Joon-hyun as Uk-chool
- Oh Dae-hwan as Doo-mok
- Park Sung-joon
- Jung Man-sik

== Original soundtrack ==
=== OST Part 1 ===
No.	Title	Artists	Length
1.	"Jeongeupsa (Pop Ver.) (정읍사 (Pop Ver.))"	Lee Sang-eun	4:34
2.	"Jeongeupsa (Pop Ver.) (정읍사 (Pop Ver.))" (Inst.)		4:34
Total length:			9:08

=== OST Part 2 ===
No.	Title	Artist	Length
1.	"Jeongeupsa (정읍사)"	Seo Hyun-jin feat. Kim Na-ni	4:34
2.	"Jeongeupsa (정읍사)" (Inst.)		4:34
Total length:			9:08

== Ratings ==
- In this table, The blue numbers represent the lowest ratings and the red numbers represent the highest ratings.

Episode #	Original broadcast date	Average audience share			
Episode #	Original broadcast date	TNmS Ratings		AGB Nielsen	
Episode #	Original broadcast date	Nationwide	Seoul National Capital Area	Nationwide	Seoul National Capital Area
1	September 30, 2013	7.4%	8.8%	7.5%	8.6%
2	October 1, 2013	7.5%	8.2%	7.3%	8.5%
3	October 2, 2013	7.1%	8.4%	6.7%	8.0%
4	October 3, 2013	5.5%	6.2%	6.5%	7.5%
5	October 4, 2013	5.6%	5.7%	5.6%	5.8%
6	October 7, 2013	7.7%	9.0%	7.1%	7.9%
7	October 8, 2013	7.5%	8.7%	7.1%	8.0%
8	October 9, 2013	8.5%	9.4%	8.2%	8.7%
9	October 10, 2013	7.2%	7.4%	7.4%	8.3%
10	October 11, 2013	6.6%	7.4%	6.6%	7.3%
11	October 15, 2013	5.6%	6.1%	6.1%	6.6%
12	October 17, 2013	6.4%	7.2%	6.9%	7.6%
13	October 18, 2013	5.7%	6.2%	5.6%	5.7%
14	October 21, 2013	7.5%	7.6%	7.0%	7.3%
15	October 22, 2013	7.8%	8.6%	7.7%	8.3%
16	October 23, 2013	7.7%	8.2%	7.1%	7.8%
17	October 24, 2013	7.8%	8.3%	7.4%	8.2%
18	October 25, 2013	7.7%	8.4%	6.1%	6.7%
19	October 28, 2013	6.7%	7.2%	8.0%	8.4%
20	October 29, 2013	6.9%	7.2%	7.3%	8.0%
21	October 30, 2013	7.6%	8.1%	7.3%	8.1%
22	November 1, 2013	6.8%	7.8%	7.6%	7.9%
23	November 4, 2013	6.9%	7.1%	7.6%	8.3%
24	November 5, 2013	8.4%	9.1%	8.7%	9.6%
25	November 6, 2013	8.1%	8.5%	8.2%	8.6%
26	November 7, 2013	7.8%	8.0%	8.3%	9.3%
27	November 8, 2013	7.7%	8.4%	8.1%	9.1%
28	November 11, 2013	8.5%	9.3%	7.5%	7.9%
29	November 12, 2013	8.0%	8.6%	8.8%	9.3%
30	November 13, 2013	6.9%	7.3%	8.0%	8.6%
31	November 14, 2013	8.2%	8.8%	7.6%	8.4%
32	November 15, 2013	6.4%	6.6%	5.7%	6.6%
33	November 18, 2013	7.8%	8.8%	8.6%	9.4%
34	November 19, 2013	8.8%	10.1%	8.7%	9.3%
35	November 20, 2013	8.2%	8.0%	7.6%	8.0%
36	November 21, 2013	8.4%	8.6%	8.1%	8.4%
37	November 22, 2013	8.1%	8.4%	7.9%	8.5%
38	November 25, 2013	8.8%	10.6%	8.5%	8.9%
39	November 26, 2013	8.2%	9.0%	8.7%	9.0%
40	November 27, 2013	8.3%	8.1%	8.6%	9.2%
41	November 28, 2013	8.6%	9.5%	8.8%	9.6%
42	November 29, 2013	7.8%	8.7%	7.7%	8.2%
43	December 2, 2013	10.1%	11.7%	8.6%	9.0%
44	December 3, 2013	9.7%	9.9%	9.7%	10.7%
45	December 4, 2013	8.7%	9.4%	9.2%	10.0%
46	December 5, 2013	8.6%	9.2%	9.6%	10.2%
47	December 6, 2013	8.2%	8.5%	8.2%	9.1%
48	December 9, 2013	8.9%	10.3%	9.7%	10.3%
49	December 10, 2013	9.4%	10.4%	10.0%	10.4%
50	December 11, 2013	8.5%	9.6%	9.0%	9.1%
51	December 12, 2013	9.3%	10.8%	9.1%	9.2%
52	December 13, 2013	8.0%	8.9%	8.4%	9.5%
53	December 16, 2013	9.3%	10.8%	8.8%	9.1%
54	December 17, 2013	9.4%	10.9%	9.2%	9.4%
55	December 18, 2013	9.0%	9.9%	9.0%	9.7%
56	December 19, 2013	8.4%	9.0%	8.9%	9.5%
57	December 20, 2013	7.7%	8.4%	9.2%	9.4%
58	December 23, 2013	9.9%	10.1%	9.5%	10.5%
59	December 24, 2013	8.9%	9.9%	9.6%	10.5%
60	December 25, 2013	9.1%	10.1%	10.3%	11.5%
61	December 26, 2013	9.3%	10.2%	10.2%	11.4%
62	December 27, 2013	7.8%	8.0%	9.1%	9.8%
63	January 1, 2014	9.7%	10.5%	10.6%	11.6%
64	January 2, 2014	9.3%	10.2%	9.6%	10.6%
65	January 3, 2014	8.3%	9.5%	8.9%	9.4%
66	January 6, 2014	9.2%	10.4%	10.4%	10.6%
67	January 7, 2014	10.3%	11.6%	10.2%	11.0%
68	January 8, 2014	9.6%	11.1%	9.0%	9.7%
69	January 9, 2014	8.7%	9.7%	9.6%	10.8%
70	January 10, 2014	8.9%	10.8%	8.4%	9.0%
71	January 13, 2014	9.9%	11.9%	9.3%	10.1%
72	January 14, 2014	10.1%	11.6%	10.5%	10.7%
73	January 15, 2014	8.8%	10.3%	9.9%	10.3%
74	January 16, 2014	10.5%	12.3%	10.2%	10.4%
75	January 17, 2014	8.2%	8.3%	8.9%	9.9%
76	January 20, 2014	9.8%	11.6%	10.3%	11.4%
77	January 21, 2014	9.8%	10.6%	11.1%	12.1%
78	January 22, 2014	9.7%	9.8%	9.7%	9.8%
79	January 23, 2014	9.4%	11.4%	9.7%	10.6%
80	January 24, 2014	9.6%	10.1%	9.2%	9.5%
81	January 27, 2014	10.0%	11.1%	9.0%	9.4%
82	January 28, 2014	9.4%	10.5%	9.8%	10.3%
83	January 29, 2014	9.2%	10.2%	9.1%	9.3%
84	February 3, 2014	10.6%	12.0%	10.8%	11.1%
85	February 4, 2014	10.6%	11.5%	10.6%	11.1%
86	February 5, 2014	9.6%	10.3%	10.0%	10.5%
87	February 6, 2014	9.8%	11.0%	10.1%	10.7%
88	February 7, 2014	9.3%	9.7%	10.0%	10.6%
89	February 13, 2014	8.6%	9.1%	9.1%	9.5%
90	February 14, 2014	10.0%	10.9%	9.1%	9.6%
91	February 17, 2014	10.9%	12.4%	10.6%	10.8%
92	February 19, 2014	10.8%	11.7%	11.5%	11.5%
93	February 20, 2014	10.7%	11.3%	10.7%	10.8%
94	February 24, 2014	10.0%	12.9%	10.9%	11.8%
95	February 25, 2014	10.9%	12.3%	11.6%	11.7%
96	February 26, 2014	10.5%	11.1%	10.8%	10.5%
97	February 27, 2014	11.1%	12.4%	10.8%	11.5%
98	February 28, 2014	10.0%	11.0%	11.4%	11.2%
99	March 3, 2014	10.6%	12.2%	11.8%	12.0%
100	March 4, 2014	10.4%	11.0%	11.4%	11.5%
101	March 5, 2014	11.1%	12.2%	10.5%	10.2%
102	March 6, 2014	10.5%	12.2%	10.7%	11.0%
103	March 7, 2014	10.2%	12.0%	9.8%	9.7%
104	March 10, 2014	11.6%	13.2%	11.0%	11.2%
105	March 11, 2014	10.9%	11.5%	11.5%	12.0%
106	March 12, 2014	11.2%	11.5%	11.7%	12.2%
107	March 13, 2014	11.3%	12.5%	11.4%	12.4%
108	March 14, 2014	11.5%	11.8%	11.6%	11.7%
Average		8.83%	9.73%	9.02%	9.58%

== Awards and nominations ==
Year	Award	Category	Recipient	Result
2013	MBC Drama Awards	Top Excellence Award, Actor in a Serial Drama	Lee Jae-ryong	Nominated
2013	MBC Drama Awards	Excellence Award, Actor in a Serial Drama	Jo Hyun-jae	Nominated
2013	MBC Drama Awards	Excellence Award, Actress in a Serial Drama	Seo Hyun-jin	Nominated
2013	MBC Drama Awards	Excellence Award, Actress in a Serial Drama	Seo Woo	Nominated
2014	APAN Star Awards	Excellence Award, Actress in a Serial Drama	Seo Hyun-jin	Nominated
