= Seowon University =

Private university in South Korea

Coordinates: 36°37′30.5″N 127°28′55.8″E

- 서원대학교
- Type: Private
- Undergraduates: 6825
- Postgraduates: 168
- Location: Cheongju, North Chungcheong, South Korea
- Website: SWU

Seowon University (Acronym: SWU, Korean: 서원대학교; RR: Seowon Daehakgyo, colloquially Seowondae) is a four-year private university located in Cheongju, North Chungcheong, South Korea. It was established in 1968 and was also called Cheongju College of Education by its old name.

It is a medium-sized university with 6,825 undergraduate and 168 graduate students. It comprises six undergraduate colleges and two graduate schools. The undergraduate colleges are made up of nine faculties, twenty-five departments, and twenty-three majors. The graduate schools are composed of twenty-seven departments and fifteen majors.

It maintains sisterhood relationships with forty-seven universities in fifteen countries: Canada, China, Taiwan, Malaysia, Mongolia, Philippines, Russia, United States, Italy, Bangladesh, Thailand, Indonesia, United Kingdom, Vietnam, and Ukraine. This sisterhood relationship is provided to Seowon University students for exchange student programs and field trips.

== History ==
Seowon University was opened as Cheongju Women's Junior College on March 9, 1968. But it was reorganized several times. On March 1, 1973, it was reorganized into Cheongju Women's Normal University of Education. On March 1, 1979, it was reorganized into Cheongju College of Education. Finally, on March 1, 1980, it was reorganized into 'Seowon University'.

In March, 1992, Seowon University was raised to the status of a university and a lifelong education center.

=== Buildings ===
The college established a graduate school of Education in 1994. On September 12, 2002, the college opened Future Creation Hall. On September 20, 2006, the college opened Regional Innovation Center(RIC). Also, it completed Art Hall on January 16, 2009. Then in 2013, it opened Bio Convergence Center and held International Symposium. It opened the Global Hall in 2014, Mokmin Hall for additional dormitory space in 2015 and the Innovation Hall in 2017.

=== Inauguration and Appointment ===
On March 30, 2012, It had an inauguration of Son Yong Ki as the 20th chairman of the board and an appointment of the 14th chancellor Son Seok Min on March 31, 2012.

=== Awards and Appraisal ===
In 2017, Seowon University won the Prime Minister's Award at the Small and Medium Business Technology Innovation Competition and received the Presidential Citation for 2017, Job Creation Support. In 2018, it received 'Deputy Prime Minister and Minister of Education Award' for 2017 Free Semester Meritorious Institute. Also, Seowon University was selected as 'Autonomous Improvement University' by Ministry of Education In the University Basic Competency Assessment on August 23, 2018. It received a rank 'A' for evaluation of teacher training institution on September 27, 2020.

== Academics ==
=== Undergraduate Colleges ===
Undergraduate colleges at the Seowon university are organized into 6 colleges and programs. Three of these colleges consist of academic departments: College of Education, College of Global Management, and College of Future.

==== College of Education ====
The College of Education, which continues the tradition of Cheongju College of Education, provides training to teachers, particularly those who plan to teach in public middle and high schools. It offers eleven departments in three faculties: Humanity and Social Science Faculty (Korean Language Education, English Education, Education, Early Childhood Education, Ethics Education, Social Studies Education, History Education), Natural Science Faculty (Mathematics Education, Biology Education), Art & Music & Physical Faculty (Physical Education, Music Education).

==== College of Global Management ====
The College of Global Management consists of three faculties with a focus on business.

- Faculty of Business Administration

The Faculty of Business Administration provides the overall instruction of industry, accounting, marketing & computer programming for business, and knowledge of trade affairs and international logistics. It runs four majors: Business Administration Major, Accounting Major, Management Information Systems Major, and International Trade Major. International Trade Major is a non-educational major, but credits can be applied in the teaching program.

- Faculty of International Studies

The Faculty of International Studies is newly established in 2018. It provides courses for language theory and for literature, society, and culture of each country that the languages are used in. It has opened up three majors: Chinese Major English Major, and Teaching Korean as a Foreign Language Major. Credits from all three majors can be applied to language education programs.

- Department of Advertising & Public Relations

The Department of Advertising & Public Relations develops the ability to understand advertising and marketing planning theoretically and apply it in practical terms. It teaches each field of marketing, (advertising) design, copy, and communication necessary for advertising and public relations. Unlike other departments, it is conducted in parallel with online and offline classes.

==== College of Future ====
- School of Vision

It provides lifelong study courses. Classes are held at night, so late learners can study while being employed. The programs are for the development of employee performance, employment, and starting a business. For reference, 50% of tuition is provided for 4 year. So far, it has established 3 majors: Business Administration Major, Social Welfare Major, and Infant and Child Care Major.

=== Graduate Colleges ===
Graduate programs are provided through two graduate schools: Graduate School of Education and Graduate School of Industry.

==== Graduate School of Education ====
Graduate School of Education is an institution for training pre-service teachers. It also provides additional in-service education. It is divided into 16 departments of education and is a five-semester Tuesday and Thursday evening classes.

==== Graduate School of Industry ====
The Graduate School of Industry was approved as an SMB (small and medium-sized businesses) graduate school in October 1997 and then reorganized into the Graduate School of Industry in 2003. It now has 13 departments and 13 majors.

=== Korean Language Institute ===
The Korean Language Institute provides regular Korean language courses to foreigners and overseas Koreans who graduated from high school. The course was opened in December 2019. It has five semesters per year consisting of nine weeks, five days a week, and four hours a day. It is planned as Korean language teacher training courses, short-term courses, and TOPIK preparation classes.

== Program ==
The university currently offers the College of Biology and IT (BIT) Convergence and the College of human service as programs. The college of BIT convergence has 11 departments and the college of human service has 13 departments.

=== College of BIT Convergence ===
The college focuses on Biology and engineering with IT. Most departments conduct theoretical classes and research in parallel. It comprises two departments. Biology-related departments are Bio-cosmetics, Food Nutrition, Food Engineering, Environmental Engineering, and Medicine Manufacture Engineering. The departments of Food Nutrition and Environmental Engineering provide teacher training courses which provide qualifications for taking teacher certification exams. The four IT departments are Information Security, Computer Engineering, Information and Communication Engineering, and Multi-media, which integrates IT and design. Computer Engineering has teacher training courses.

=== College of Human Service ===
The college of Human Service consists of departments related to the service industry and focuses mainly on practical training rather than on academic subjects. It is made up of three kinds of fields. Public service fields provide courses for developing expertise and practical skills to work in public institutions and welfare courses. It provides the Department of Police Administration, Fire Administration, Welfare Administration Major, and Social Welfare Major. As an art, music and physical fields, it has the Department of Fashion, Design, Music, Leisure Sports, Performance Video, and Architecture. The Fashion Department provides teacher training courses. As of 2020, the Department of Performance Video will no longer recruit new students. Hospitality programs are Hotel Culinary Arts Faculty, Flight Crew Department, Korean Literature Department, which has Korean language courses and Korean education courses for foreigners. From 2020, the department of Korean Literature will not accept student admission. Hotel Culinary Arts Faculty has teacher training courses.

=== Reorganization of the College and Department ===
Beginning in 2021, the classification of colleges at the Seowon University will change. The university is divided into three colleges as programs: the college of BIT convergence, the college of public service, and the college of human service. The department of counseling psychology, child welfare at the college of public service, and video creative majors at the college of BIT convergence will be newly established in 2021.

== Notable people ==
- Jun Tae-soo, actor
