= Seonunsan =

Mountain in South Korea

Coordinates: 35°30′29″N 126°34′16″E

Highest point
- Elevation: 336 m (1,102 ft)

Geography
- Location: North Jeolla Province, South Korea

Seonunsan is a mountain of North Jeolla Province, western South Korea, with an elevation of 336 metres. It is a popular destination for hiking, with a variety of trails. Some leading to a giant 13m carving of Buddha on a cliff, which dates back to the Goryeo dynasty. It is also one of the premier sport climbing destinations in South Korea, having perhaps the highest concentration of difficult routes in the country.

== See also ==
- List of mountains of Korea
