= Seong of Baekje =

26th King of Baekje (r. 523–554)

King Seong 聖王 성왕
- King of Southern Buyeo
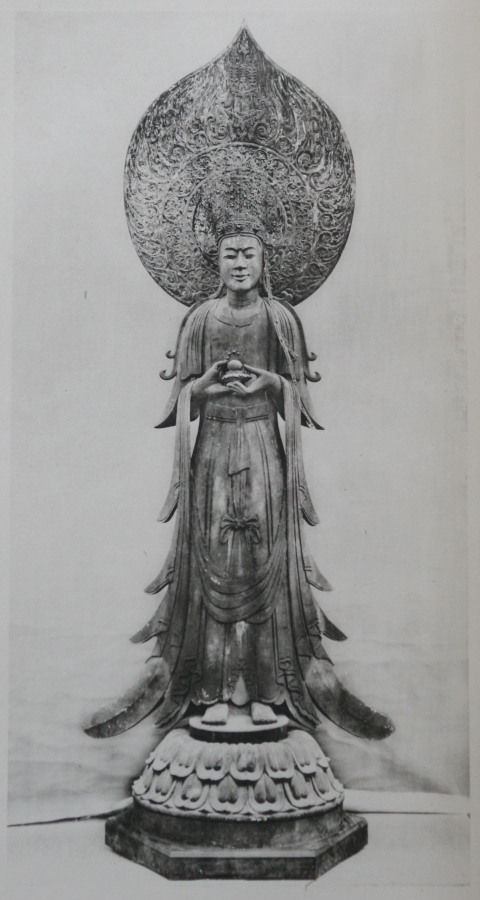
- Guze Kannon, a statue made in the image of King Seong in the Korean style

King of Baekje
- Reign: 523–554
- Coronation: 523
- Predecessor: Muryeong of Baekje
- Successor: Wideok of Baekje
- Born: 504? Baekje
- Died: 554; Baekje Gwansanseong
Posthumous name
- King Seong (聖王, 성왕)
- Father: Muryeong of Baekje
- Mother: Grand Lady

Korean name
- Hangul: 명농
- Hanja: 明襛
- RR: Myeongnong
- MR: Myŏngnong

Monarch name
- Hangul: 성왕, 명왕, 성명왕
- Hanja: 聖王, 明王, 聖明王
- RR: Seongwang, Myeongwang, Seongmyeongwang
- MR: Sŏngwang, Myŏngwang, Sŏngmyŏngwang

Seong (c. 504 – 554) was the 26th king of Baekje, one of the Three Kingdoms of Korea, reigning from 523 to 554. He was a son of Muryeong of Baekje and is best known for making Buddhism the state religion, moving the national capital to Sabi (present-day Buyeo County), and reclaiming the center of the Korean Peninsula.

== Foreign relations and Buddhism ==
Seong was known as a great patron of Buddhism in Korea, and built many temples and welcomed priests bringing Buddhist texts directly from India. In 528, Baekje officially adopted Buddhism as its state religion. He maintained his country's diplomatic ties with Liang dynasty China as well as early Japan.

He sent missions to Liang in 534 and 541, on the second occasion requesting artisans as well as various Buddhist works and a teacher. According to Chinese records, all these requests were granted. A subsequent mission was sent in 549, only to find the Liang capital in the hands of the rebel Hou Jing, who threw them in prison for lamenting the fall of the capital.

He is credited with having sent a mission including Norisachigye (노리사치계, 怒利斯致契, ?-?) in 538 to Japan that brought an image of Shakyamuni and several sutras to the Japanese court. This has traditionally been considered the official introduction of Buddhism to Japan. An account of this is given in Gangōji Garan Engi.

He attended a Buddhist conference at Ara Gaya (安羅會議) in 529. Sabi Conferences (泗沘會議) were held in 541 and 544 at Sabi capital.

== Move of the capital ==
In 538, he moved the capital from Ungjin (present-day Gongju) further south to Sabi (present-day Buyeo County), on the Geum River. Unlike the earlier move of the capital from the present-day Seoul region to Ungjin, forced by the military pressure of Goguryeo, the move to Sabi was directed by the king to strengthen royal power, aided by the political support of the Sa clan based in Sabi.

He completely reorganized the administration of the country to strengthen central control, to counteract the political power of the noble clans. He changed the name of the country to Nambuyeo, to emphasize the ancient connection to Buyeo.

== Battle among the Three Kingdoms ==
Baekje had maintained a century-long alliance with its neighbor Silla, to balance the threat of the northern kingdom Goguryeo. With the aid of Silla and the Gaya confederacy, Seong led a long campaign to regain the Han River valley, the former heartland of Baekje which had been lost to Goguryeo in 475. Baekje regained its original capital in 551. The campaign culminated in 553 with victories in a series of costly assaults on Goguryeo fortifications.

However, under a secret agreement with Goguryeo, Silla troops, arriving on the pretense of offering assistance, attacked the exhausted Baekje army and took possession of the entire Han River valley. Incensed by this betrayal, the following year Seong launched a retaliatory strike against Silla's western border. This attack was led by the crown prince (subsequent king Wideok) and joined by the Gaya confederacy. But Seong and 30,000 Baekje troops were killed in the disastrous battle. This defeat led to significant erosion of royal power.

== Legacy ==
According to the Shogeishō(聖冏抄), a compilation of the ancient historical records and traditions about the Japanese Prince Regent Shotoku Taishi, Guze Kannon is a statue that is the representation of King Seong, which was carved under the order of the subsequent King Wideok of Baekje. It was written by a Japanese monk Shogei (1341–1420), the 7th Patriarchs of the Jodo sect. The statue which had originally come from Baekje to Japan and has been preserved at the Japanese temple Hōryū-ji. The American scholar of Asian cultures Ernest Fenollosa describes the Guze Kannon he uncovered at Hōryū-ji along with the Tamamushi Shrine as "two great monuments of sixth-century Corean Art". It is referred to by the authors of The Cambridge History of Japan as one of the "great works of Asuka art created by foreign priests and preserved as Japanese national treasures".

His third son, Imseongtaeja (琳聖太子), left for Japan, via Taiwan, after his father was killed. Imseongtaeja is credited for playing a key role in the formation of the early Japanese state. Because of date discrepancies most scholars now say he must have been son of Wideok of Baekje.

== Family ==
- Father: Muryeong of Baekje
- Mother: unnamed
  - Brother: Prince Junda (淳陀太子, ?–513) – settled in Japan, became ancestor of Yamato clan.
  - Brother: Shigakishi (斯我君, ?–?) – known in Baekje as Buyeo Sa'a. He was sent to Japan in 505 as a political hostage to Emperor Buretsu of Japan.
  - Queen(s): unknown
    - 1st son: Buyeo Chang (扶餘昌, 525–598) – 27th King of Baekje, Wideok of Baekje.
    - 2nd son: Buyeo Gye (扶餘季, 527–599) – 28th King of Baekje, Hye of Baekje.
    - Daughter: Unknown Lady (?–?) – lesser consort ("sobi") of the 24th King of Silla, Jinheung of Silla.
    - 3rd son: name unknown (?–?) – father of Mokuto-Ō known in Baekje as "Mokdo-wang" (目圖王/目図王), ancestor of the Oka no muraji clan (岡連氏). He settled in Japan.

== Popular culture ==
- Portrayed by Ahn Suk-hwan in the 2005-06 SBS TV series Ballad of Seodong.
- Portrayed by Jo Hyun-jae in the 2013 MBC TV series The King's Daughter, Soo Baek-hyang.
- Portrayed by Kim Ho Jung in the 2017 KBS TV series Chronicles of Korea

== See also ==
- History of Korea
- Korean Buddhism
- List of monarchs of Korea

Seong of Baekje House of Buyeo Cadet branch of the House of Go Died: 554
Regnal titles
Preceded by Muryeong	King of Baekje; 523–554	Succeeded by Wideok
