= Tomb of King Muryeong =

Tumulus in Gongju, South Korea

Coordinates: 36.4606°N 127.1128°E

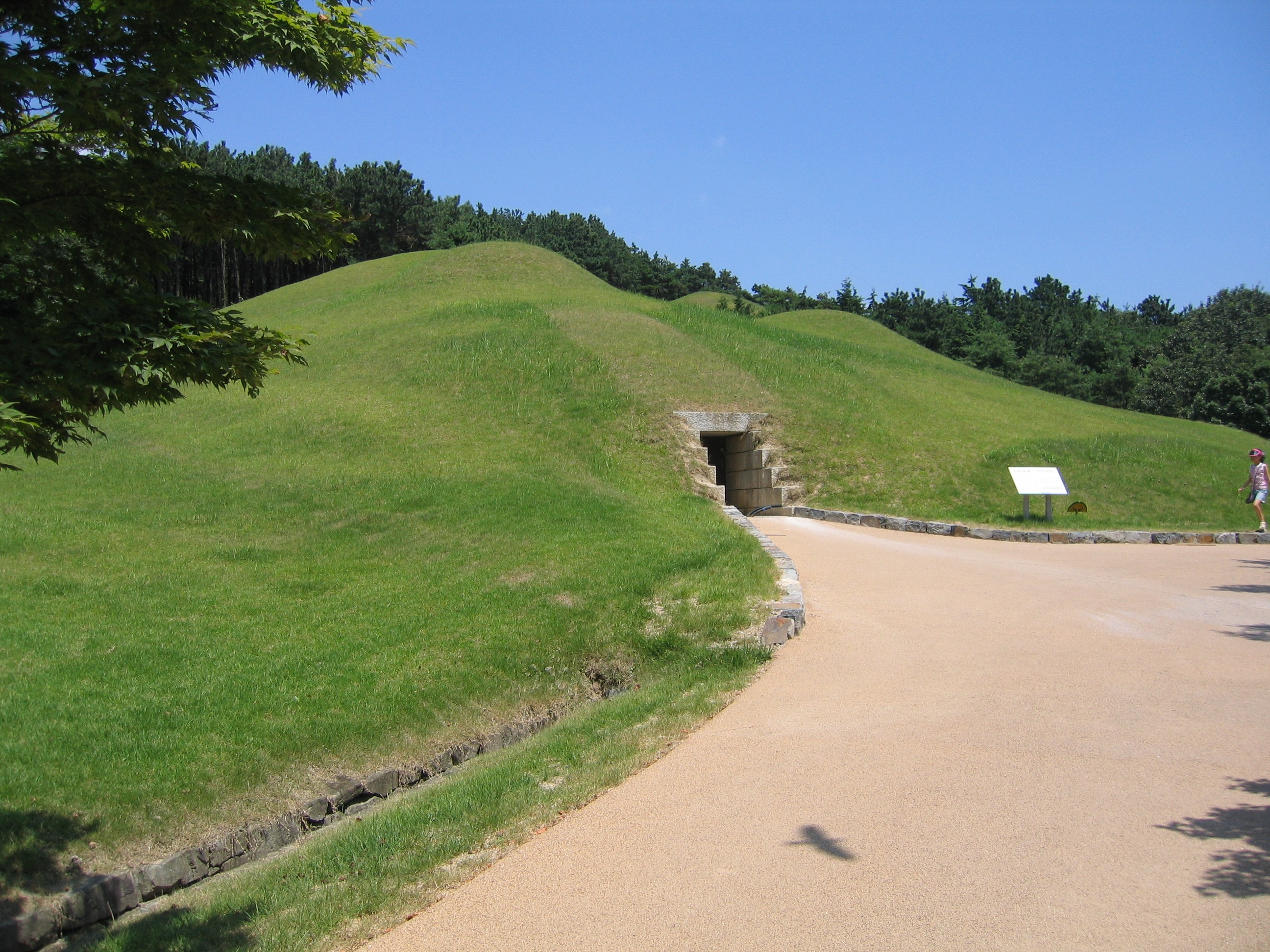
- The tomb (2011)
- Interactive map of Tomb of King Muryeong
- Location: Gongju, South Korea

UNESCO World Heritage Site
- Criteria: Cultural: (ii), (iii)
- Designated: 2015
- Part of: Baekje Historic Areas
- Reference no.: 1477-002

Historic Sites of South Korea
- Official name: Tomb of King Muryeong and Royal Tombs, Gongju
- Designated: 1963-01-21
- Reference no.: 13

Korean name
- Hangul: 무령왕릉
- Hanja: 武寧王陵
- RR: Muryeongwangneung
- MR: Muryŏngwangnŭng

The Tomb of King Muryeong, also known as Songsan-ri Tomb No. 7 (공주 송산리 7호분), is the ancient tumulus of King Muryeong, who ruled the Baekje from 501 to 523, and his queen. The rarity of intact Baekje tombs makes this one of the major archaeological discoveries in Korea and a crucial source for the understanding of Baekje, one of the Three Kingdoms of Korea.

The tomb is located in what is now Gongju, South Chungcheong Province, South Korea. It is Korean Historic Site No. 13. King Muryeong's Tomb is also registered on the South Korean government's tentative list of World Heritage Sites.

== Excavation ==
The tomb was accidentally discovered during water drainage work on the No.5 and 6 tombs in 1971. It had been untouched by grave robbers and thieves for over a millennium, and when it was excavated it was the first time the tomb had been opened since the bodies of the king and queen were interred there fifteen hundred years earlier.

The exterior of the tomb looks like an earthen mound, 20 meters in diameter and 7.7 meters (66 ft × 25 ft) in height. It is believed that the mound was originally larger. Notably, the tomb employed a drainage system. The tomb is based on the southern Chinese prototypes but also incorporates Baekje elements to create a Korean-style tomb. Solely Korean elements of the tomb include the arched shape of the chamber and the brick colour pattern. The style of King Muryeong's tumulus is found only in the Gongju area. While Chinese custom placed tombs in the north, this tomb was placed in the south. However, the king was placed in the east part of the tomb while the queen was placed in west which follows Chinese practice.

The main chamber is rectangular and made of black brick. It is 4.2 meters north–south, 2.72 meters east–west, and 3.14 meters (13 ft 9 in×8 ft 11 in×10 ft 4 in) in height. While the north and south walls stand straight, the east and west walls curve inward, creating an arched roof. The south wall has an arch-shaped door which leads to a passageway and entrance of the tomb. The door is 2.9 meters in length, 1.04 meters in width, and 1.45 meters in height (114×41×57 inches). The east and west walls have two onion-shaped or flame-shaped niches to hold lamps while the north wall has one such niche. The placement of the bricks of the tomb is in alternating rows of lengthwise and widthwise arrangements. The bricks mainly have lotus motifs but other decorations were incorporated as well.

== Artifacts ==
From the tomb, 2906 objects were excavated and subsequently classified into 108 categories. The most important objects include two pairs of royal diadems made for the king and queen and two stone epigraphs containing valuable inscriptions and dates. The epigraphs give the name and age of the king and queen and dates of their deaths and burials, a rarity for Korean tombs. These dates are also extremely valuable as they corroborate exactly the text of the Samguk Sagi.

Other objects include Chinese celadon jars, a copper bowl, gold and silver bracelets and earrings, footrests, bronze mirrors, a ring-pommelled sword, and gilt-bronze shoes. The bier in the tomb was covered by the remains of the wood coffins. The grave goods were placed below the coffins while some of the most important artifacts were placed on the bodies of the king and queen, such as the sword by the king's waist and the diadem ornaments at the heads of both the king and queen.

== Gallery ==
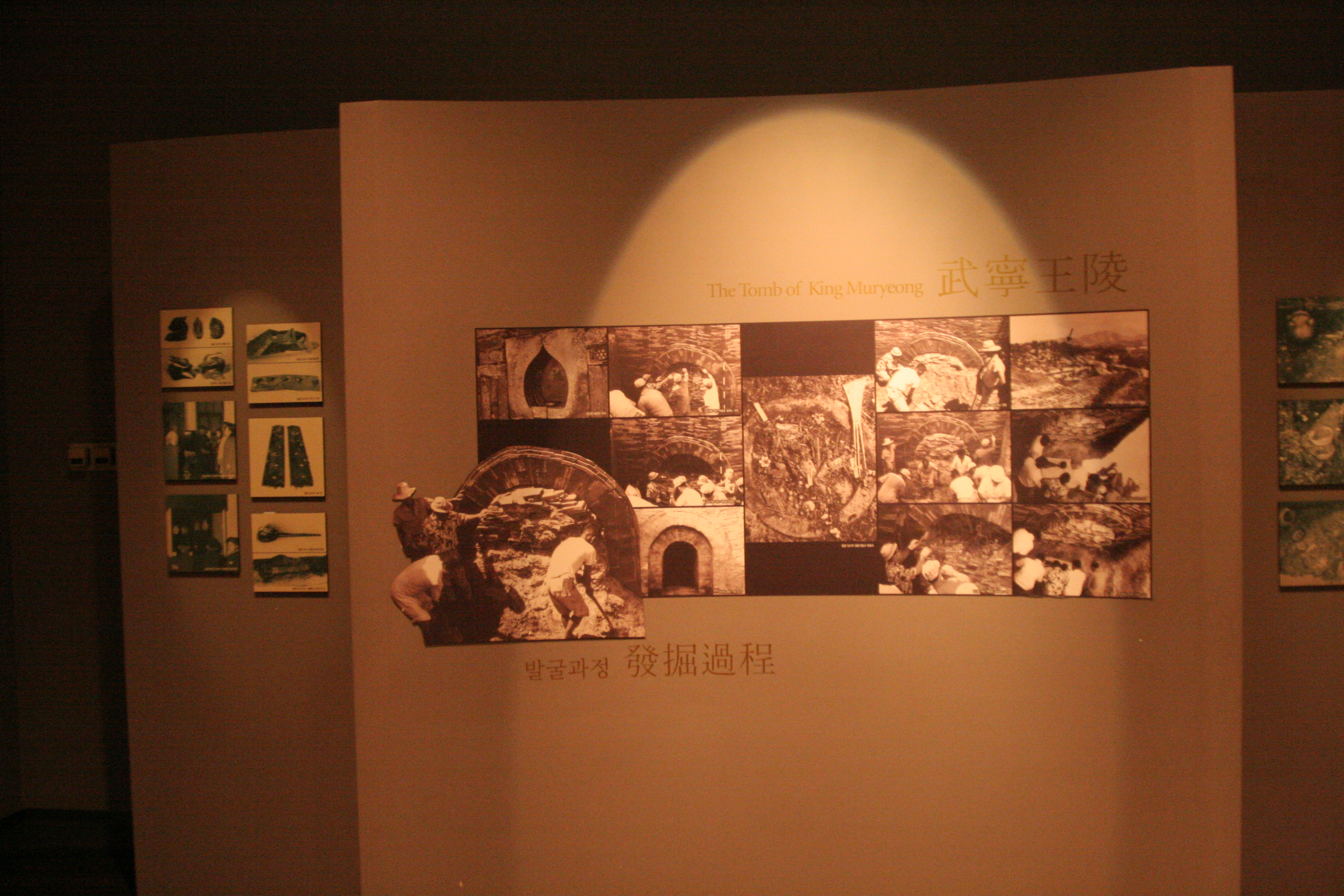
A display at the museum with images of the interior and exterior of the tomb when it was excavated.

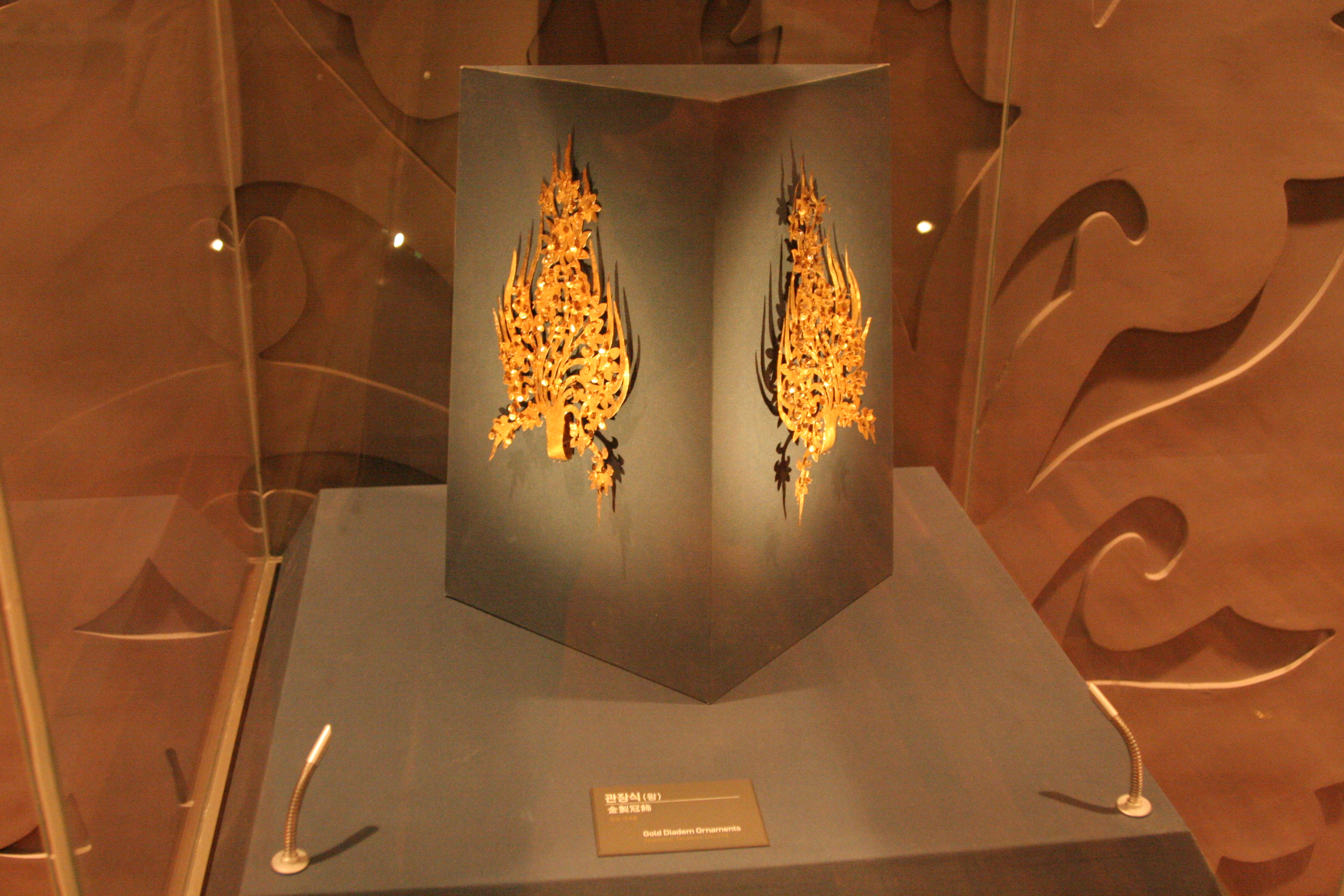
Royal diadem ornaments for the king.

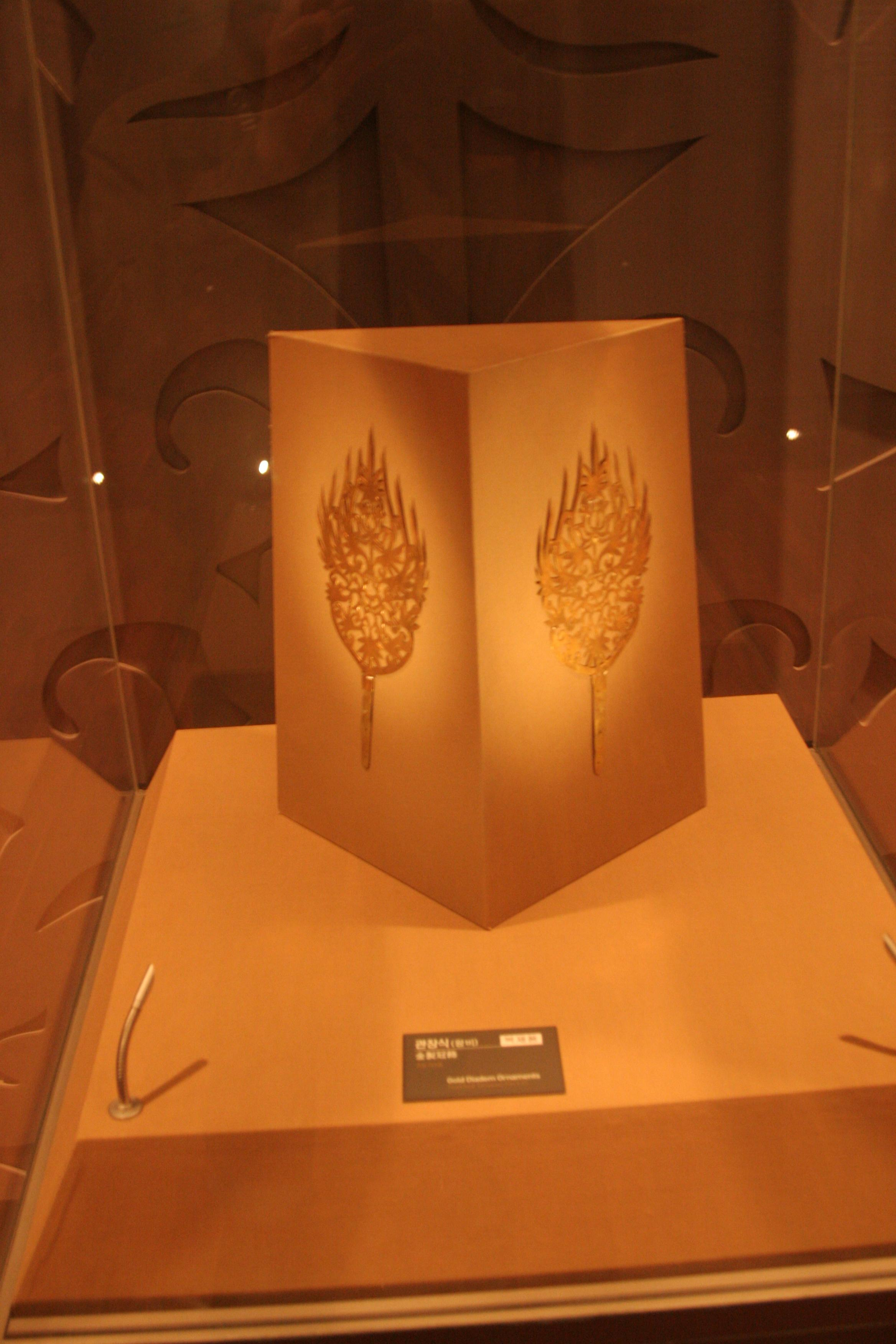
Royal diadem ornaments for the queen.

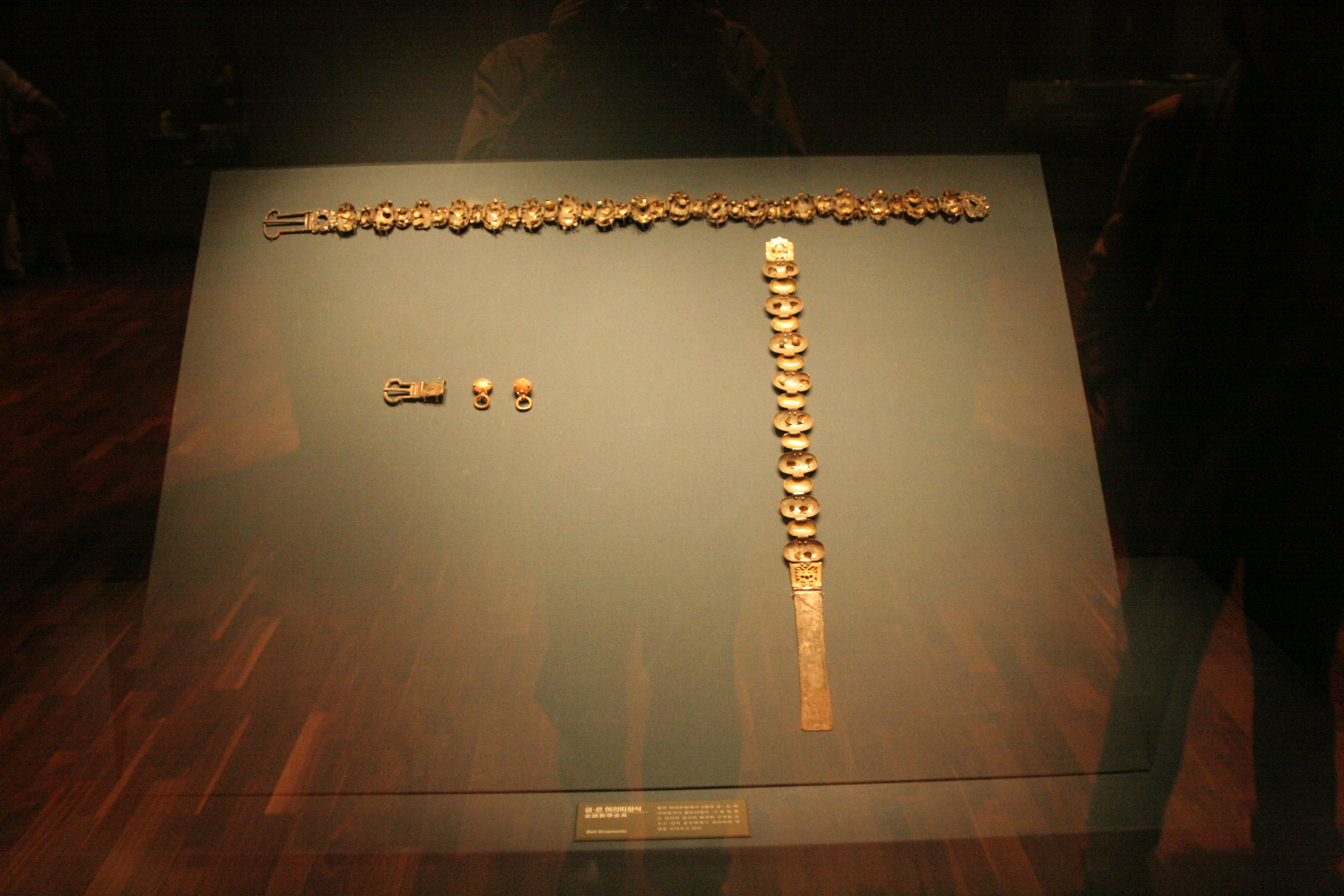
Gold girdle similar to those found in Silla tombs.

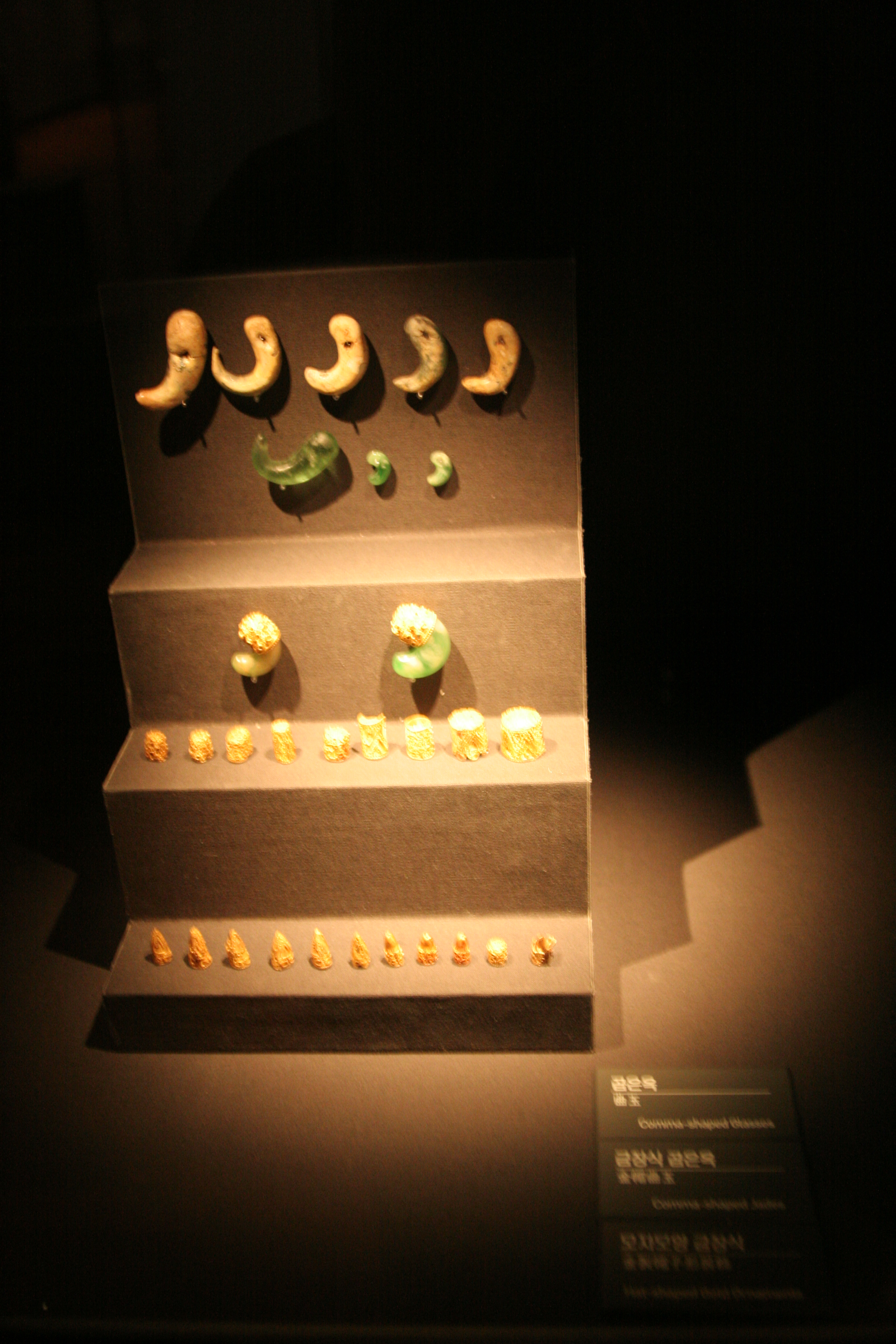
Comma-shaped beads, known as gogok found in the tomb.

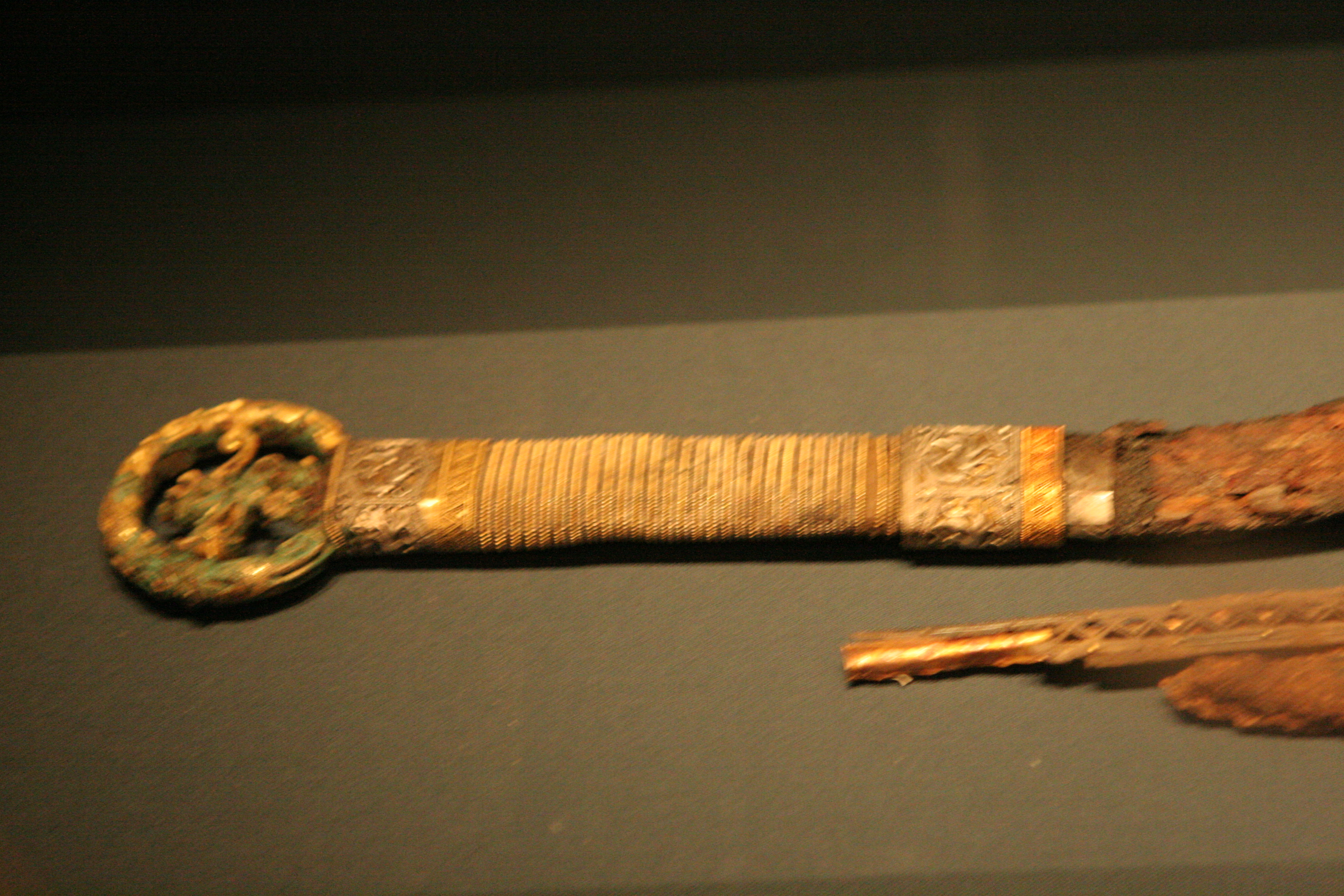
The ring-pommelled sword found at the side of the king.

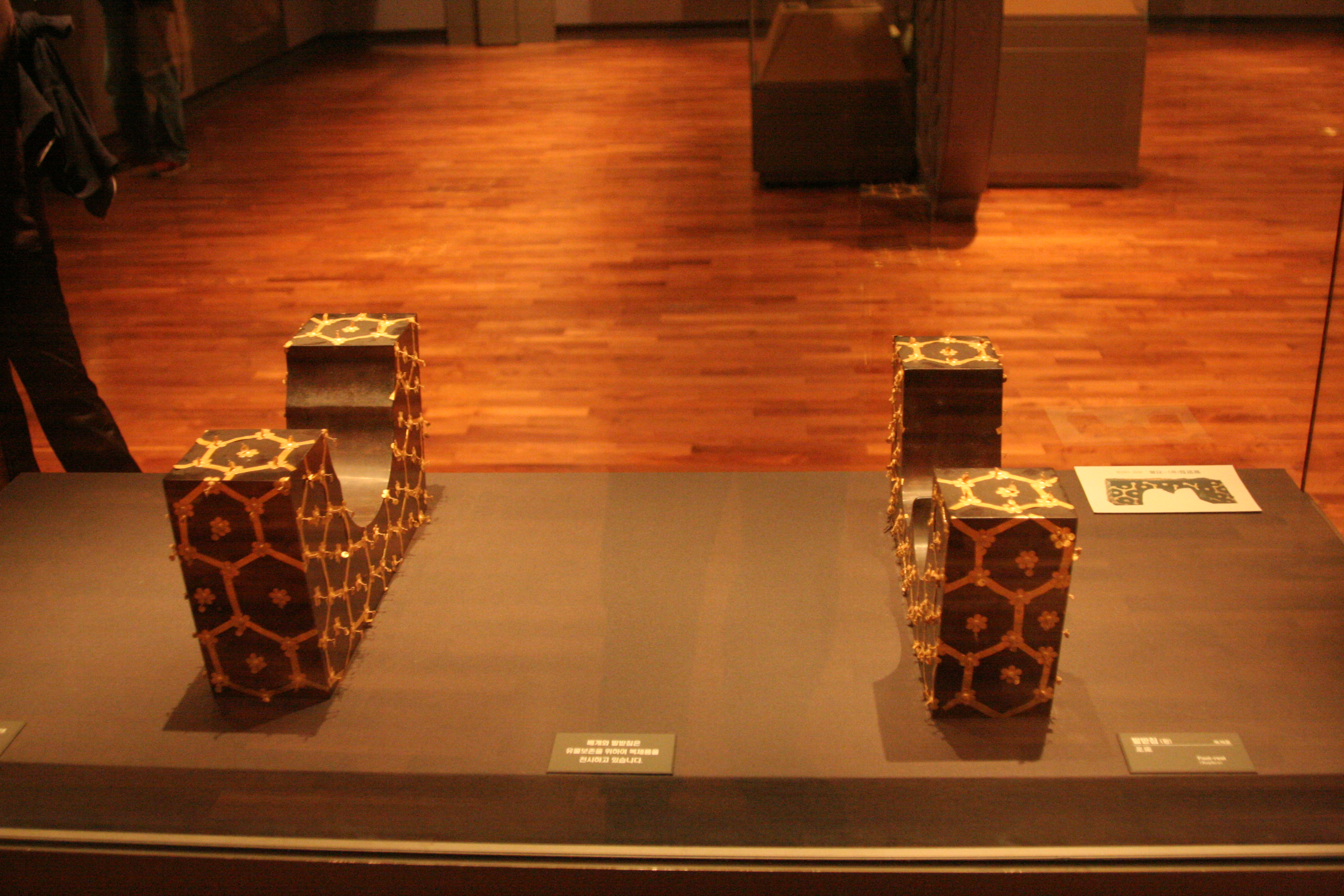
Royal foot and head rests.

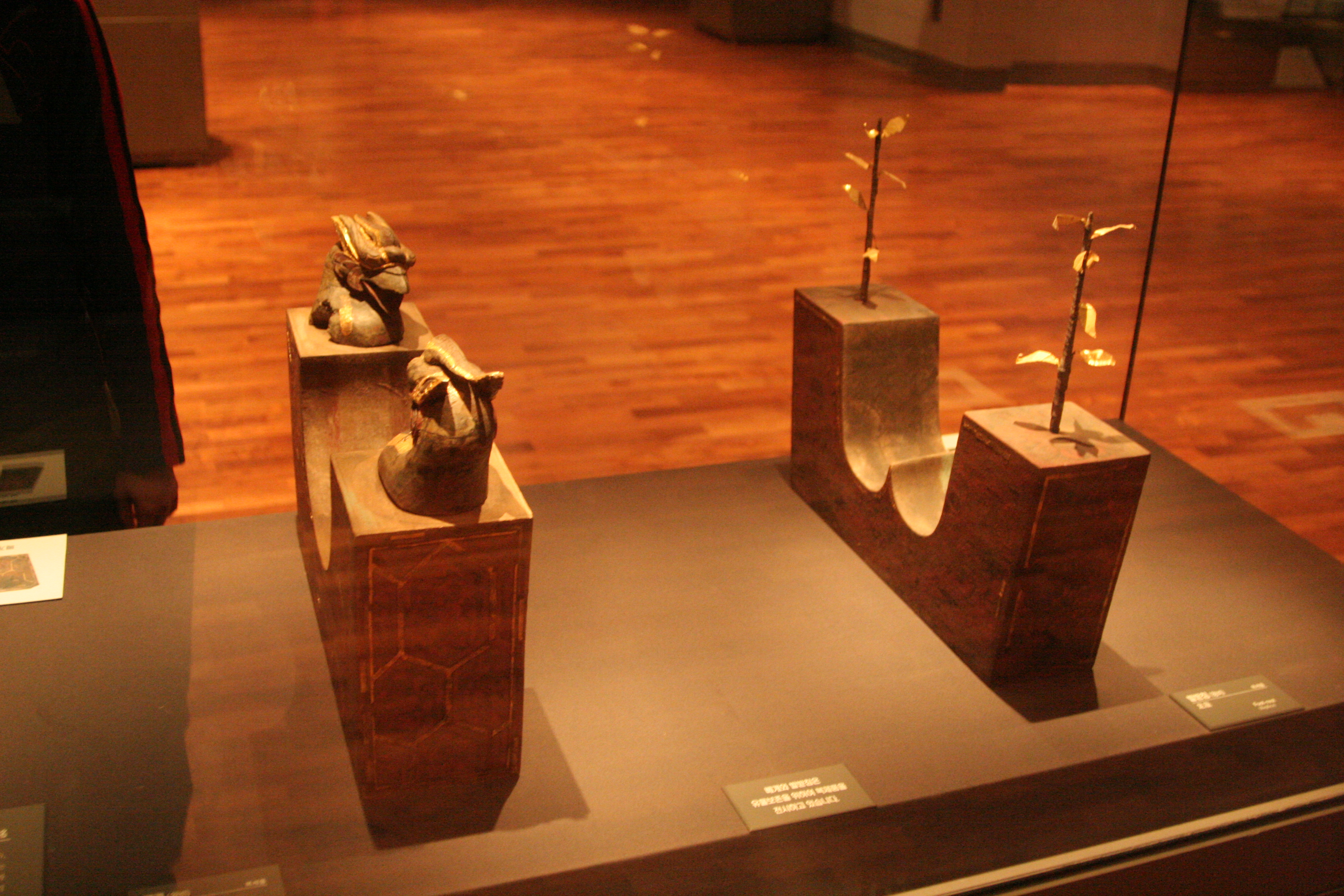
Royal foot and head rests.

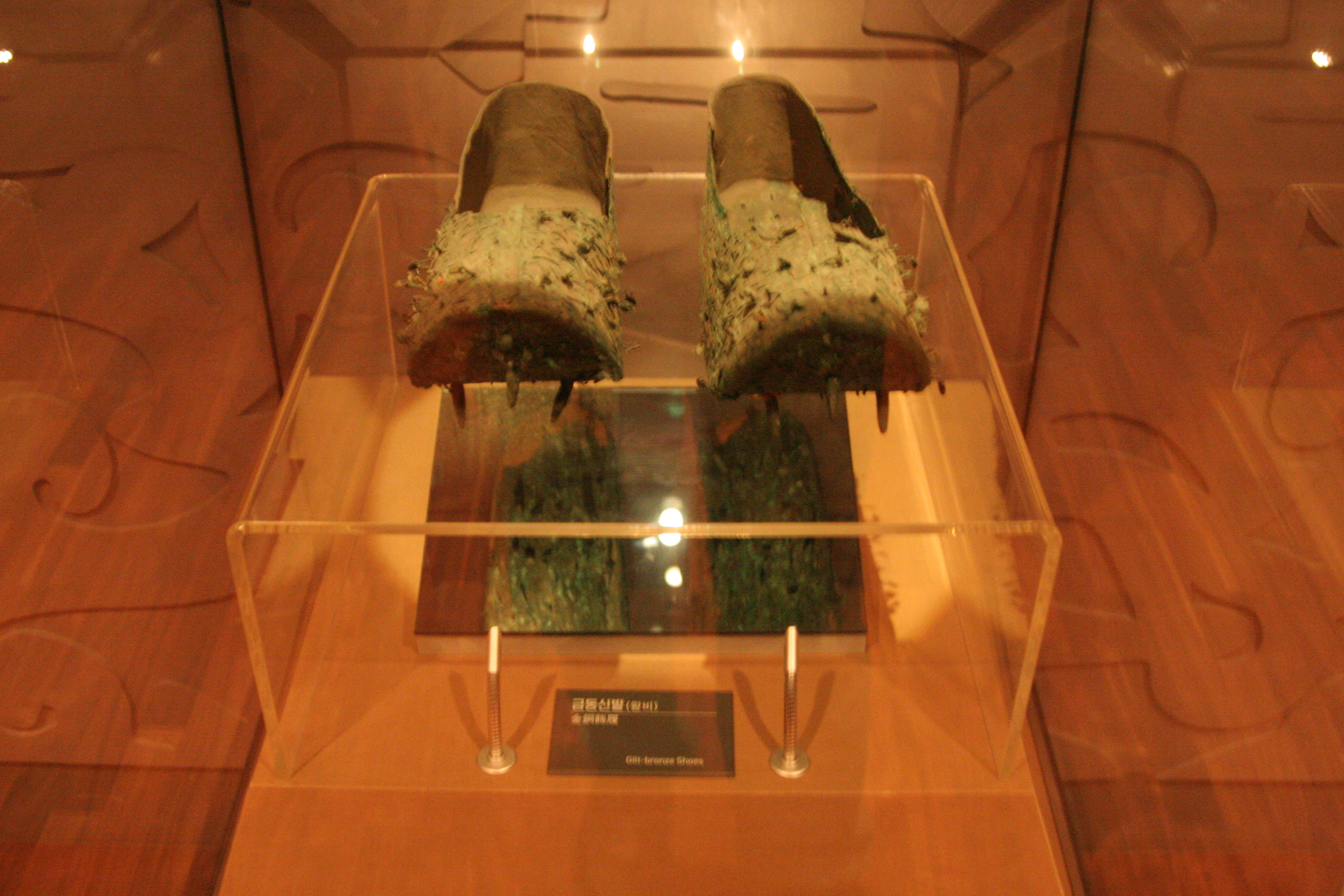
Gilt-bronze shoes.

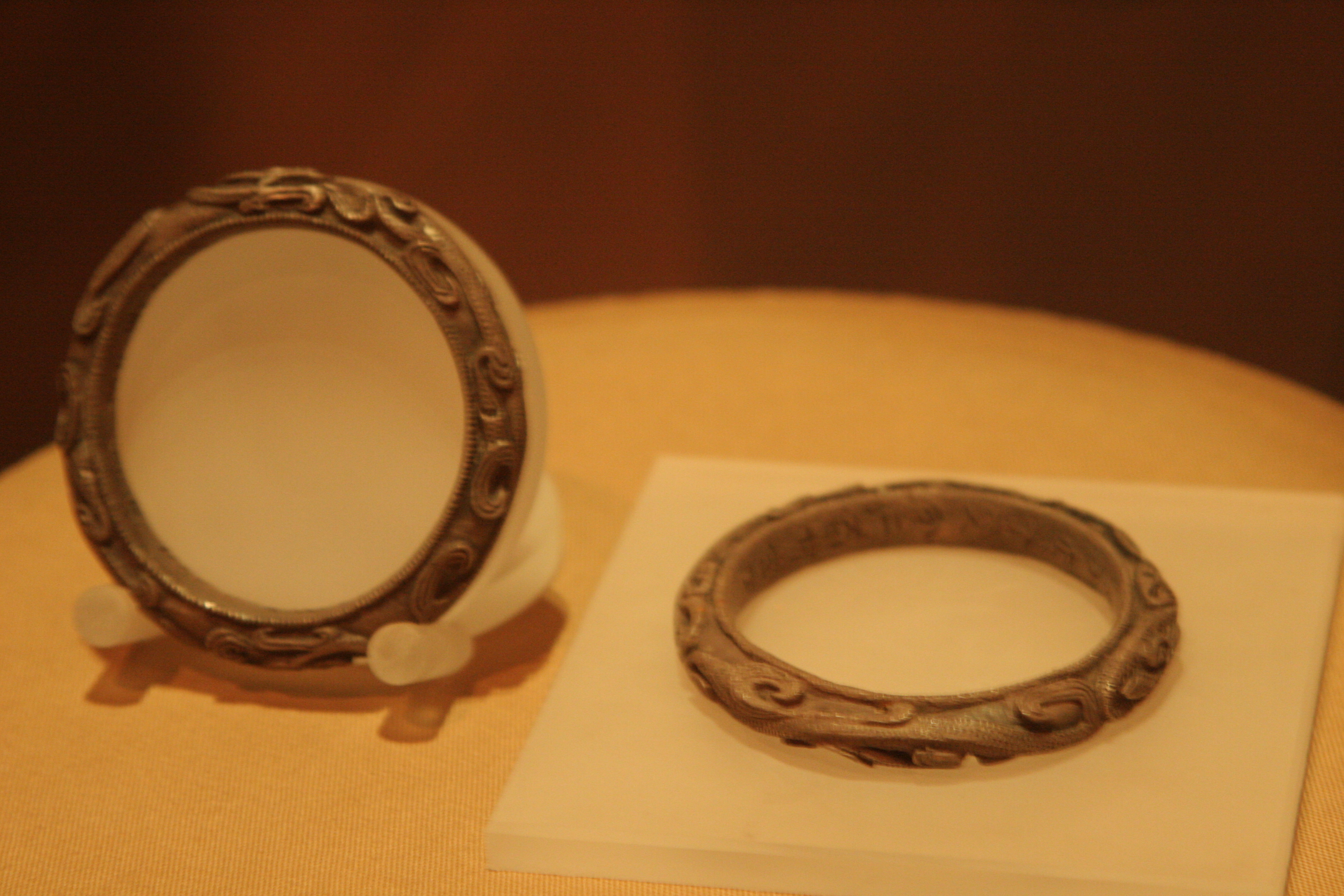
Silver bracelets for the queen with dragon designs.

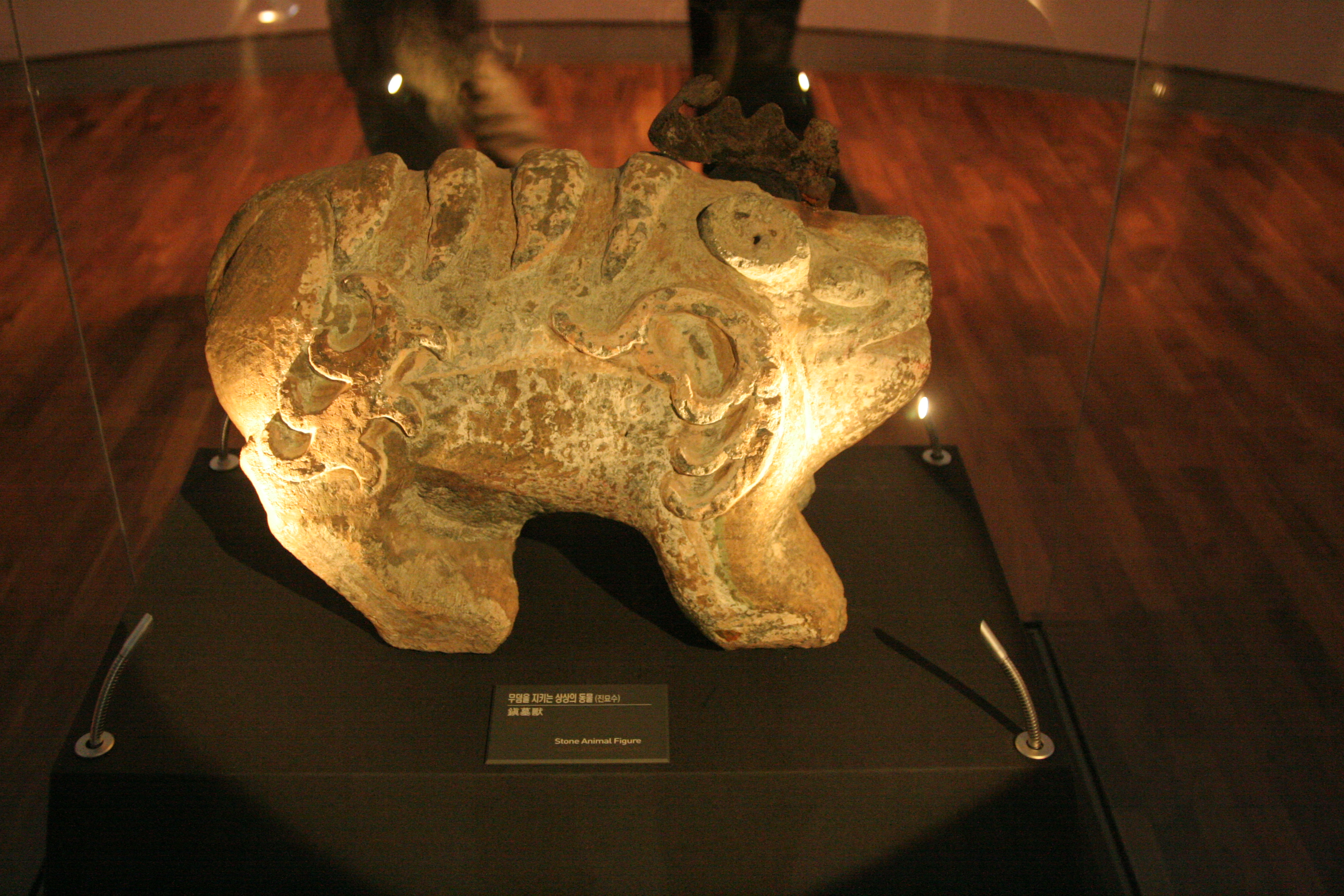
Seoksu, a rare stone creature which was interred with the king and queen to protect the tomb.

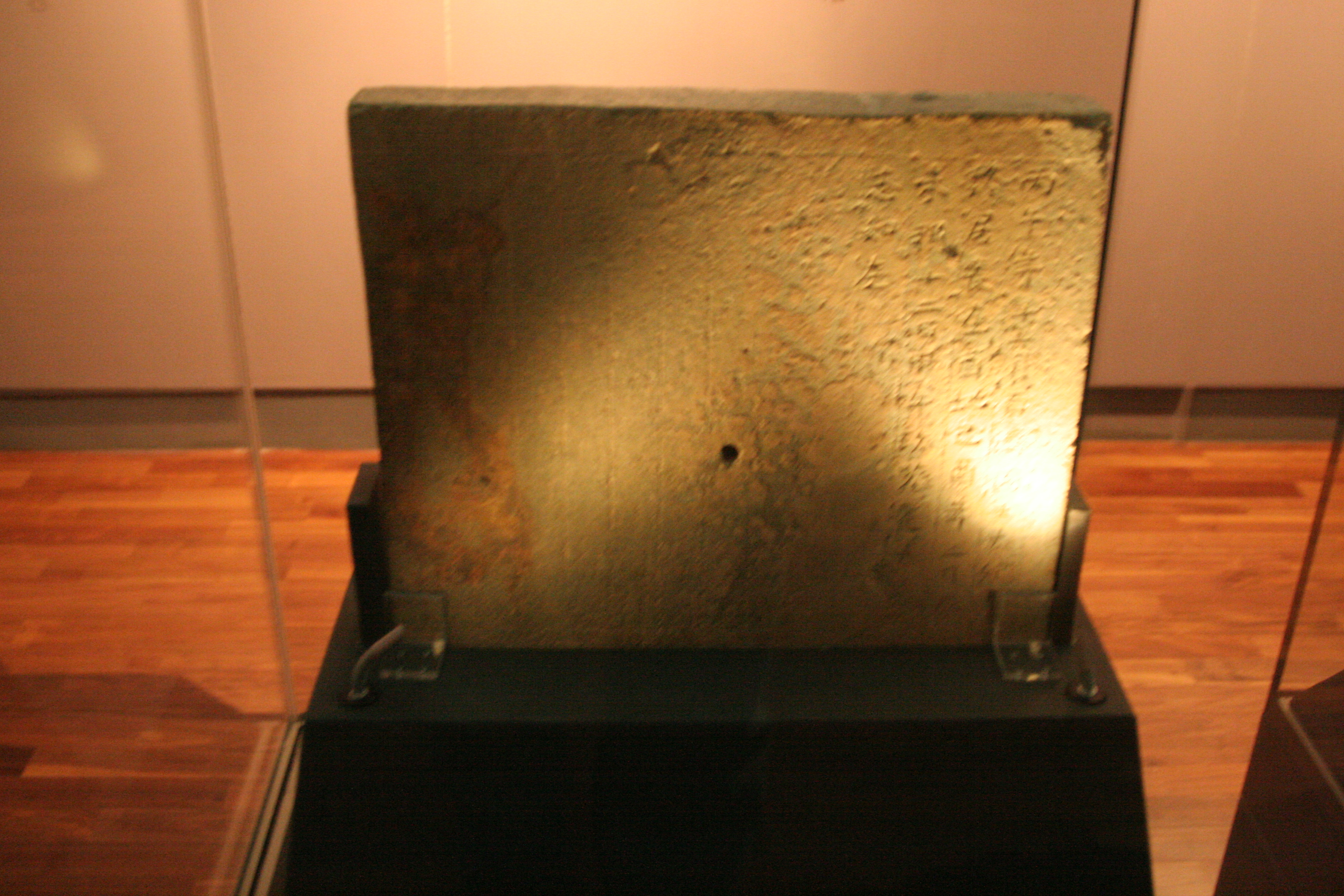
Rare royal epitaph stone plaque which describes the names of the people and the dates they were interred.

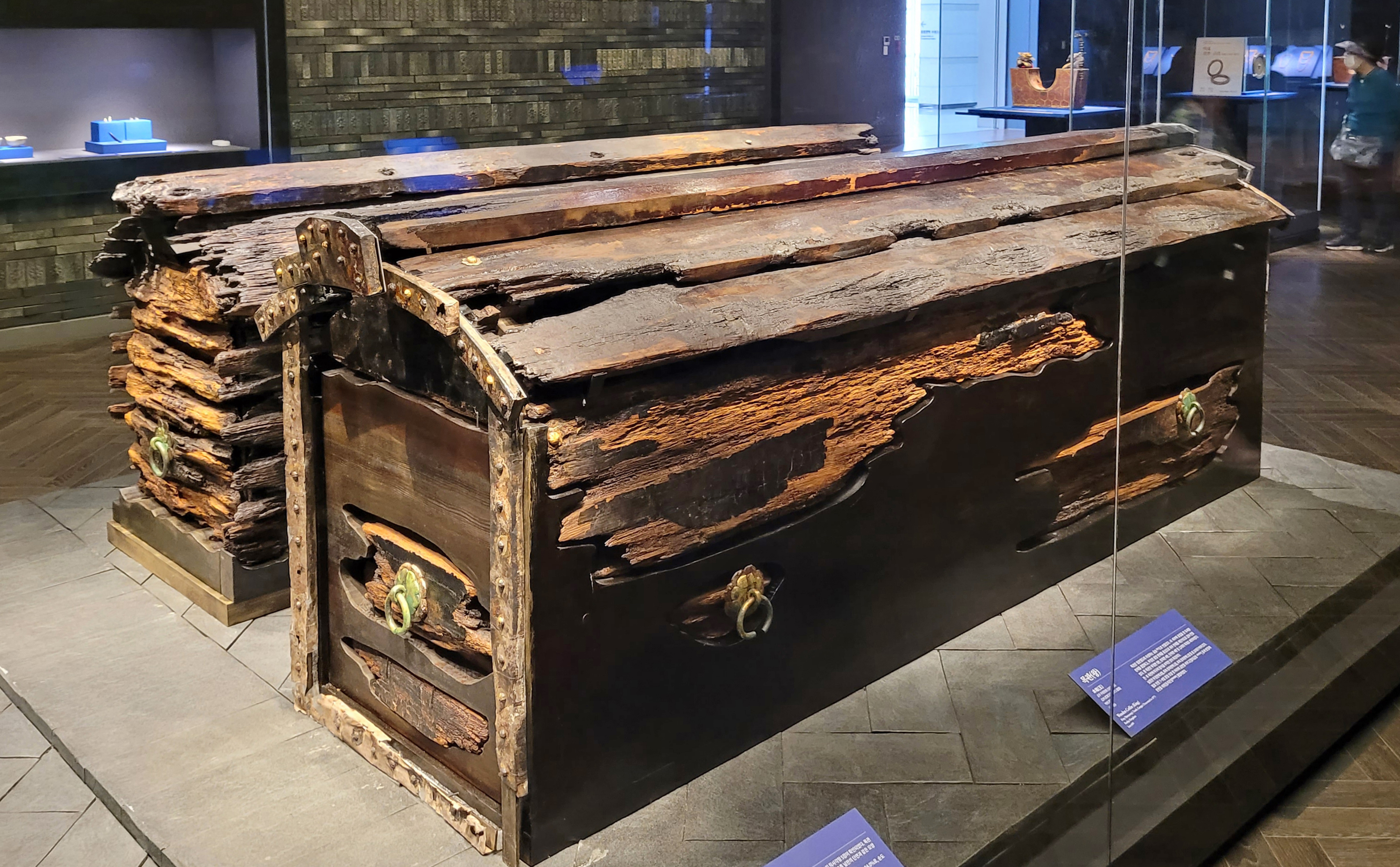
Royal coffins.

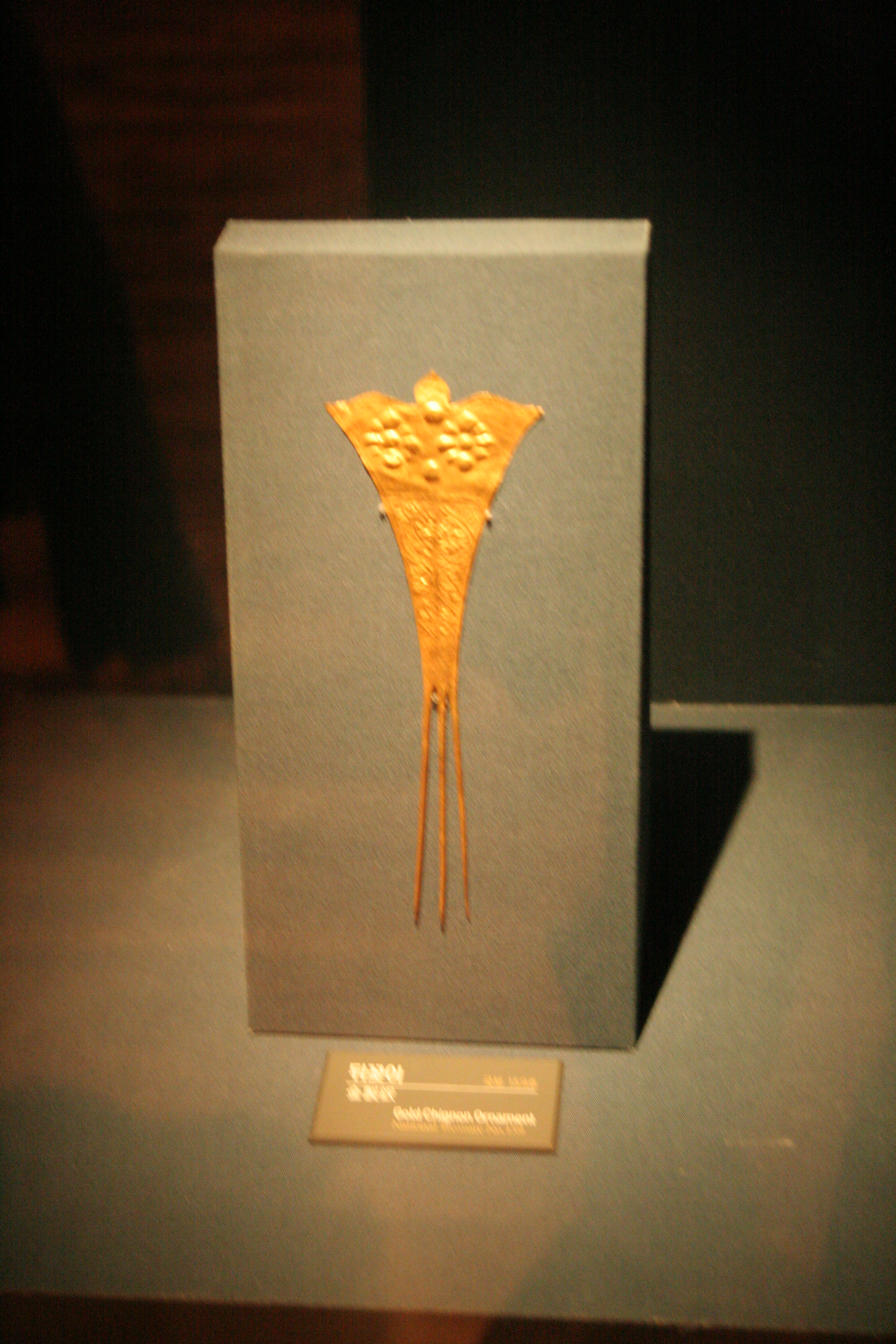
Bird-shaped gold ornament.

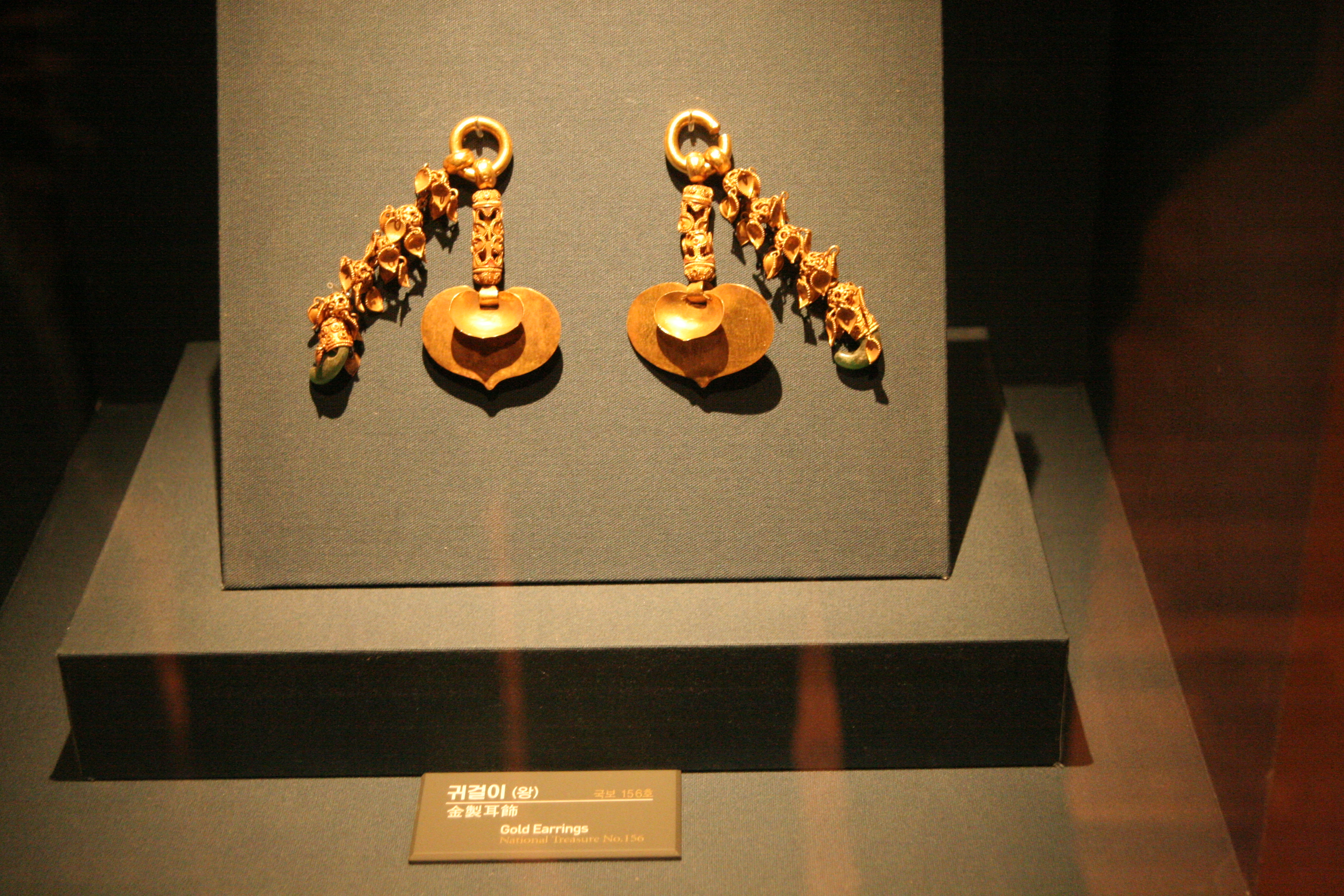
Gold earrings for the King, they are national treasures of South Korea.

== See also ==
- Baekje
- Muryeong of Baekje
- Crown of Baekje
- National Treasure (South Korea)
