= List of Koreans in Japan =

This is a list of notable Zainichi Koreans or notable Japanese people of Korean descent.

== Politics and law ==
- Arai Shoukei, politician, House of Representatives (Real Name: Park Kyung-jae)
- Haku Shinkun, politician, House of Councillors (Real Name: Baek Jinhoon)
- Han Duk-su, North Korean politician, founder and first chairman of Chongryon
- Kim Ch'on-hae, leading official of the Japanese Communist Party (Originally from Ulsan, South Korea)
- Kim Pyong-sik, North Korean politician, Vice President of North Korea and chairman of the Korean Social Democratic Party (Originally from South Jeolla Province, South Korea)
- Ko Yong-hui, wife of North Korean Supreme Leader Kim Jong-il and mother of North Korea's current leader Kim Jong-un
- Lee Kyung-jae, local activist
- Lee Myung-bak, President of South Korea (born in Osaka, ancestral roots in Pohang, North Gyeongsang)
- Park Choon-Geum, politician, House of Representatives (Originally from Miryang, Gyeongsangnam-do, South Korea)
- So Man-sul, North Korean politician, Supreme People’s Assembly of North Korea, chairman of Chongryon (Originally from Gyeongju, Gyeongsangbuk-do, South Korea)
- Togo Shigenori, Minister of Foreign Affairs (in 1941), Minister of Greater East Asia (in 1945)

== Business and economics ==
- Masahiro Miki, founder and CEO of ABC-Mart, Japanese footwear company (Real Name: Kang Jeong-ho)
- Masayoshi Son, CEO of Softbank and chairman of UK-based Arm Holdings (Real Name: Son Jeong-eui)
- Taizo Son, President and Chairman of GungHo, mobile gaming company (Real Name: Taejang Son/Son Taejang/Son Tae-jang)
- Shin Dong-bin, CEO of Lotte
- Shin Dong-joo, Vice President of Lotte USA
- Shin Kyuk-ho, founder of the Lotte group
- Yoo Bong-sik, President of MK Taxi - originally from South Gyeongsang, South Korea (Japanese Name: Sadao Aoki)
- Taido Arai, founder of Jojoen restaurant chain (Real Name: Park Tae-do)
- Kanayama Yoshio, founder of Murasaki Sports
- Kawamura Shinko (Madame Shinco), founder of Cowcow Food System and television personality
- Choung-Un Kim, vice president of Gilead Sciences and co-developer of tamiflu
- Yoshitaka Fukuda, President and CEO of Japanese consumer finance companies Aiful
- Han Chang-woo, CEO of Maruhan (Japan's largest pachinko operator) - Originally from Sacheon, Gyeongsangnam-do, South Korea
- Okamura Katsumasa, founder of Reve21

== Academic ==
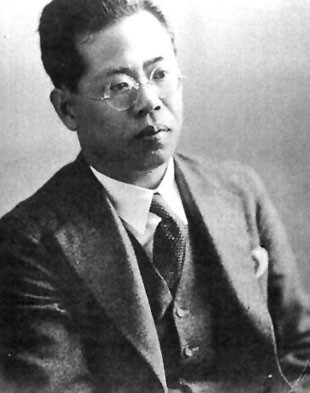
Woo Jang-choon

- Kang Sang-jung, political scientist, professor at the Seigakuin University and University of Tokyo
- Kim Wooja, sociologist, professor at Ritsumeikan University
- Woo Jang-choon, agricultural scientist and botanist
- O Sonfa, professor at Takushoku University (Real Name: Oh Seon-hwa) - Originally from Jeju-do, South Korea
- Suh Sung, Japanese-born Korean professor, writer and former political prisoner
- Kim Ik-kyŏn, sociologist, professor at Kobe Gakuin University
- Kyŏng-ju Kim, linguist, professor at Tokai University
- Kanayama Rika, historian, professor at International Christian University (Real Name: Kim Mal-cha)
- Yanchun Kaku (Real Name: Kwak Yangchun), economist, President of Rikkyo University (2018-2021)
- An Katsumasa, psychiatrist, professor at Kobe University
- Lee Young-suk, sociolinguist, professor at Hitotsubashi University - Originally from South Korea
- Yi Sookyung, historical sociologist, professor at Tokyo Gakugei University - Originally from South Korea
- Jeongyun Lee, educationist, professor at University of Tokyo - Originally from South Korea
- Kim Moonkyong (Kin Bunkyō), specialist of Chinese literature, professor at Tsurumi University
- Yang-gi Kim, cultural historian, professor at Tokoha University
- Myungsoo Kim, sociologist, professor at Kwansei Gakuin University
- Kim Sook-hyun, political scientist, professor at Tokoku University and secretary for Ichirō Ozawa
- Kilnam Chon, computer scientist, professor at KAIST and Keio University

== Literature and poetry ==
- Boichi, mangaka (Real Name: Mu-jik Park)
- Kim Shijon, poet and activist
- Lee Hoesung, Akutagawa Prize-winning novelist
- Lee Yangji, Akutagawa Prize-winning novelist
- Masaji Ishikawa, novelist and North Korean defector
- Megumu Sagisawa, novelist
- Tachihara Masaaki, novelist (Real Name: Kim Yun Kyu) - Originally from Andong, Gyeongsangbuk-do, South Korea
- Yang Sok-il, novelist
- Yu Miri, Akutagawa Prize-winning novelist
- Hiroshi Aoyama,Manhwa

== Entertainment ==
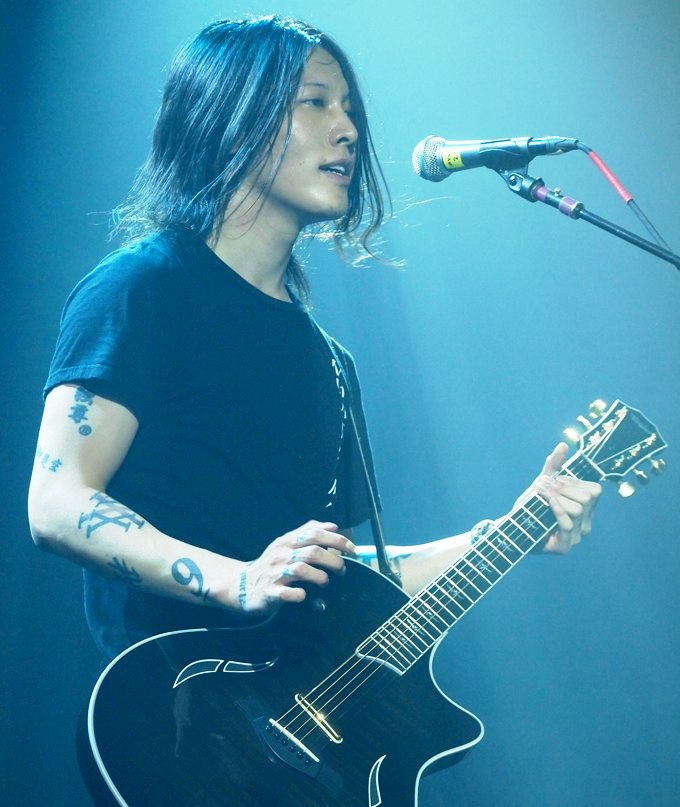
Miyavi

=== Film and television ===
- Daisuke Ryu, actor (Real Name: Jang Myeong-nam)
- Sang-il Lee, Japan Academy Prize-winning film director
- Yoichi Sai, Japan Academy Prize-winning film director (Real Name: Choe Yang-il)
- Yūsaku Matsuda, actor
- Hakuryu, actor and musician (Real Name: Jun Jung-il)
- Houka Kinoshita, actor (Real Name: Rhee Bon-hwa)
- Brian Tee, Japanese American actor, second-generation Zainichi Korean
- Kaho Minami, actress
- Yuna Ito, singer
- Yuny Han, actress, singer, and pianist (Real Name: Han Tae-youn)
- Juri Watanabe, model, Miss Universe Japan 2021
- Koichi Iwaki, actor (Real Name: Lee Gwon-il)
- Hirofumi Arai, actor, third-generation Zainichi North Korean (Real Name: Park Kyung-sik)
- Hwang Jang-lee, martial artist and film actor
- Tsuyoshi Ihara, actor (Real Name: Yun Yu-gu)
- Kim Su-gil, film director and producer
- Hyunri, actress (Real Name: Lee Hyun-ri)
- Johnny Okura, actor and musician (Real Name: Park Unhwan/Park Unan)
- Kōhei Tsuka, playwright, theater director, and screenwriter (Real Name: Kim Pongung)
- Mipo O, film director, screenwriter, and commercial director
- Romi Park, voice actress and singer
- Yang Yong-hi, film director
- Sohee Park, actor
- Sunghoo Park, anime director
- Gong Teyu, actor (Real Name: Gong Dae-Yoo)
- Hanae Kan, actress (Real Name: Han Young-hye)
- Keiko Matsuzaka, actress (Real Name: Han Kyeong-ja)
- Kiko Mizuhara, actress and model (Real name: Audrie Kiko Daniel)
- Sayuki Ito, Miss Universe Japan 2026

=== Music ===
- Chon Wolson, soprano opera singer (Real Name: Jeon Wol-seon)
- Kim Sung-Je, member of Supernova
- Tomoyasu Hotei, also known as Hotei, Korean father and Russian-born Japanese mother
- Mink, J-pop singer (Real Name: Lee Mink)
- Miyavi, musician
- Jyongri, singer (Real Name: Cho Jyong-ri)
- Crystal Kay, singer
- Hong-Jae Kim, conductor
- Kim Seikyo, conductor
- Ayumi Lee, as also known as Iconiq, singer, Korean father and second-generation Zainichi Korean mother
- Harumi Miyako, enka singer (Real Name: Rhee Chun-mi)
- Apeace, South Korean K-pop boygroup based in Japan
- Park Pushim, reggae artist
- Kunihiko Ryo, composer (Real Name: Yang Bang-ean)
- Shion, singer (Real Name: Yu-hyang Park)
- Shoo, K-pop singer (Real Name: Shū Kunimitsu)
- Sonim, singer, third-generation Zainichi Korean (Real Name: Seong Son-im)
- Towa Tei, DJ (Real Name: Dong-hwa Chung)
- Verbal, rapper of M-Flo (Real Name: Ryu Yeong-gi)
- Akiko Wada, singer (Real Name: Kim Bok-ja)
- Kohh, rapper
- Yuna Ito, singer, Japanese father and Korean-American mother
- Rihwa, pop singer (Real Name: Park Ri-hwa)
- RiSe, singer, model and K-pop idol, former member of K-pop girlgroup Ladies' Code (Real Name: Kwon Ri-se)
- Kangnam, singer, television personality and K-pop idol, former member of K-pop boygroup M.I.B.
- Chanmina, rapper and pop musician
- Yoshi (Kanemoto Yoshinori), producer, rapper and K-pop idol, member of K-pop boy group Treasure (Real Name: Kim Bang-jeon)
- Giselle (Uchinaga Eri), singer, rapper, dancer and K-pop idol, member of K-pop girlgroup æspa (Real Name: Kim Ae-ri)
- Saori, singer, model and entertainer (Real Name: Jang Eun-ju)
- Obata Minoru, singer (Real Name: Kang Young-cheol)
- Soul (Haku Shota), singer, rapper, dancer and member of P1Harmony

== Sports ==
=== Baseball ===
- Kanemoto Tomoaki, professional baseball player, member of the Japanese Baseball Hall of Fame
- Kaneda Masaichi, professional baseball player, member of the Japanese Baseball Hall of Fame (Real Name: Kim Kyung-Hong)
- Harimoto Isao, professional baseball player, member of the Japanese Baseball Hall of Fame (Real Name: Jang Hun)
- Hideo Fujimoto, professional baseball player, member of the Japanese Baseball Hall of Fame (Real Name: Lee Pal-yong)
- Arai Takahiro, professional baseball player
- Arai Ryota, professional baseball player
- Morimoto Hichori, professional baseball player (Real Name: Heechul Lee)
- Hisao Niura, professional baseball player (Real Name: Kim Il-young)
- Hiyama Shinjiro, professional baseball player (Real Name: Hwang Jin-hwan)
- Kinjoh Tatsuhiko, professional baseball player (Real Name: Kim Yong-eon)
- Song Il-soo, former manager of the Doosan Bears

=== Martial arts ===
- Ōyama Masutatsu, martial arts expert and founder of IKO Kyokushinkaikan, also known as Choi Bae-dal (Real Name: Choi Yeong-eui) - Originally from Gimje, Jeollabuk-do, South Korea
- Matsui Akiyoshi, President of Kyokushin-kaikan (Real Name: Moon Jang-gyu)
- Royama Hatsuo, President of Kyokushin-kan (Real Name: Noh Cho Woong)
- Akiyama Yoshihiro, judoka and mixed martial artist (Real Name: Sung-hoon Choo)
- Kotetsu Boku, kickboxer and mixed martial artist (Real Name: Park Kwang-cheol)
- Hiromitsu Kanehara, mixed martial artist and professional wrestler (Real Name: Kim Wang-hong)
- Hwang Jang-lee, martial artist and film actor
- Kim Eui-tae, South Korean judoka and bronze medalist at 1964 Tokyo Olympics
- Oh Seung-lip, South Korean judoka and silver medalist at 1972 Munich Olympics
- Park Young-chul, South Korean judoka and bronze medalist at 1976 Montreal Olympics
- An Chang-rim, South Korean judoka and bronze medalist at 2020 Tokyo Olympics
- Kin Taiei, mixed martial artist (Real Name: Taeyoung Kim)
- Hideo Nakamura, karateka and first president of the Karatedo Kendokai (Real Name: Kang Chang-Soo) - Originally from Pyongyang, North Korea

=== Professional wrestling ===
- Rikidōzan, pro-wrestler, (Real Name: Kim Sin-rak) - Originally from Hongwon County, South Hamgyong Province, North Korea
  - Mitsuo Momota, pro-wrestler, son of Rikidōzan
  - Yoshihiro Momota, pro-wrestler, son of Rikidōzan
- Kensho Obayashi, pro-wrestler, also known as Zeus (Real Name: Kim Bon-u), former AJPW Triple Crown Heavyweight Champion and a former four-time World Tag Team Champion
- Kanemoto Koji, pro-wrestler (Real Name: Kim Il-Sung)
- Kintarō Ōki, pro-wrestler, also known as Kim Il (Real Name: Kim Tae-sik)
- Kanemura Kouhiro, pro-wrestler (Real Name: Kim Hyeong-ho)
- Kantaro Hoshino, pro-wrestler, manager, and promoter (Real Name: Yeo Geon-bu)
- Maeda Akira, pro-wrestler (Real Name: Go Il-myeong)
- Ryouji Sai, pro-wrestler (Real Name: Choi Young-ii)
- Tatsuhito Takaiwa, pro-wrestler (Real Name: Go Yong-Il)
- Yoshida Mitsuo, pro-wrestler, also known as Riki Choshu (Real Name: Kwak Gwang-ung)
- Jake Lee, pro-wrestler (Real Name: Lee Che-Gyong)
- Hiromitsu Kanehara, mixed martial artist and professional wrestler (Real Name: Kim Wang-hong)

=== Soccer ===
- Lee Tadanari, professional football player for the Japan national team (Real Name: Lee Chung-Sung)
- Takahiro Kunimoto, professional football player
- Okayama Kazunari, professional football player (Real Name: Kang Il-Sung)
- Masahiro Okamoto, professional football player
- Ahn Young-Hak, North Korean football player
- Han Ho-gang, South Korean football player
- Jong Tae-Se, North Korean football player
- Kim Jong-Song, North Korean football player
- Kim Seong-Yong, North Korean football player
- Ri Han-Jae, North Korean football player
- Ryang Gyu-Sa, North Korean football player
- Ryang Yong-Gi, North Korean football player
- Son Min-chol, North Korean football player
- Kim Jung-ya, South Korean football player
- Kim Yong-Gwi, South Korean football player

=== Sumo ===
- Tamanoumi Masahiro, sumo wrestler and yokozuna
- Kaneshiro Kōfuku, sumo wrestler
- Kinkaiyama Ryū, sumo wrestler (Real Name: Kim Yeon Soo)
- Tamarikidō Hideki, sumo wrestler (Real Name: Cho Young-rae)
- Tochinowaka Michihiro, sumo wrestler (Real Name: Dae Won Lee)
- Kasugaō Katsumasa, sumo wrestler (Real Name: Kim Seong Taek)
- Maenoyama Taro, sumo wrestler

=== Other ===
- Takako Shirai, volleyball player, Olympic gold medalist at 1976 Summer Olympics, silver medalist at 1972 Summer Olympics, and member of the Volleyball Hall of Fame (Real Name: Jeongsoon Yoon)
- Hayakawa Ren, archer and bronze medalist at 2012 Summer Olympics (Real Name: Um Hye-ryeon)
- Hayakawa Nami, archer at 2008 Summer Olympics (Real Name: Uhm Hye-rang/Uhm Hyerang)
- Lee Ryol-li, North Korean boxer, former WBA super bantamweight champion
- Kim Chae-Hwa, South Korean figure skater
- Kunimoto Keisuke, race car driver, winner of 2008 Macau Grand Prix (Real Name: Lee Gyeong-Woo)
- Yuji Kunimoto, race car driver
- Tokuyama Masamori, professional boxer, former WBC super flyweight champion (Real Name: Chang-Soo Hong)
- Koo Ji-won, rugby union player
- Teiru Kinoshita, professional boxer (Real Name: Park Tae-Il)
- Katsunari Takahashi, professional golfer (Real Name: Go Seung-Seong)
- Haru Nomura, female professional golfer (Real Name: Minkyung Moon)
- Takazumi Katayama, motorcycle racer, former Grand Prix motorcycle road racing world champion
- Lee Seung-Sin, rugby union player

== Crime ==
- Machii Hisayuki, godfather and founder of the Toa-kai yakuza syndicate (Real Name: Jeong Geon-Yeong)
- Makino Kuniyasu, Yakuza leader of the Matsuba-kai (Real Name: Lee Chun-seong)
- Takayama Tokutaro, godfather of the Aizukotetsu-kai yakuza syndicate (Real Name: Gang Oe-su)
- Kiyota Jiro, godfather of the Inagawa-kai (Real Name: Shin Byung-kyu)
- Hashimoto Hirofumi, godfather of the Kyokushin-Rengo-Kai (Real Name: Kang Hong-mun)
- Yanagawa Jiro, godfather of the Yanagawa-Gumi (Real Name: Yang Won Suk) - Originally from Busan, South Korea
- Jo Hiroyuki, uyoku assassin (Real Name: Seo Yuheng)
- Mun Segwang, failed assassin of Park Chung-hee
- Joji Obara, serial rapist and murderer (Real Name: Kim Sung Jong)
- Kwon Hyi-ro, murderer who brought public attention to discrimination against the Zainichi
- Sin Gwang-su, North Korean spy, involved in North Korean abductions of Japanese (Originally from North Korea)
- Hayashi Yasuo, of the member in the Aum Shinrikyo. He was to carry out the Sarin gas attack on the Tokyo subway

== Korean Royal Families ==
- Yi Geon, Korean prince, the first son of Prince Yi Kang of Korea, grandson of Emperor Gwangmu and a cavalry officer in the Imperial Japanese Army during World War II
- Yi Un, the last crown prince of Joseon Korea.
- Prince Junda, the second son of King Muryeong of Baekje and the founding ancestor of the Yamato no Fuhito clan
- Shigakishi, the third son of King Muryeong of Baekje
- Buyeo Gonji, member of the royal family of Baekje, one of the Three Kingdoms of Korea, son of the 21st king, Gaero of Baekje and younger brother of the 22nd king, Munju of Baekje
- Dongseong of Baekje, the 24th king of Baekje, one of the Three Kingdoms of Korea and the 1st son of Buyeo Gonji
- Muryeong of Baekje, the 25th king of Baekje, one of the Three Kingdoms of Korea and the 2nd son of Buyeo Gonji
- Mokuto-Ō, prince of Baekje, one of the Three Kingdoms of Korea, the grandson of Seong of Baekje and ancestor of both Gwisil clan and Oka no muraji clan
- Prince Asa, the eldest son of King Wideok of Baekje and older brother of Prince Imseong
- Prince Imseong, the third son of King Wideok of Baekje, younger brother of Prince Asa and ancestor of the Ōuchi clan (Originally from Baekje)
- Gwisil Boksin, military general of Baekje, one of the Three Kingdoms of Korea and member of the Gwisil clan (Originally from Baekje)
- Gwisil Jipsa, the son of Gwisil Boksin

== Samurai ==
- Wakita Naokata, samurai from Joseon who served the Maeda clan in the early Edo period and Commissioner of Kanazawa city (Real Name: Kim Yeo-cheol) - Originally from Hanseong, Joseon (Currently Seoul, South Korea)
- Hoshiyama Chūji, founder of Satsuma ware (Real Name: Kim Hae) - Originally from Joseon
- Soga Seikan, samurai from Joseon who served Nakagawa Hidenari, the first daimyō of Oka, as a retainer (Originally from Joseon)
- Akizuki Tanenobu, renowned Korean style tofu merchant (Real Name: Park Won-hyuk) - Originally from Joseon
- Rinoie Motohiro, samurai from Joseon who served the Mōri clan and retainer of Chōshū Domain in the early Edo period and son of Korean commander and politician Yi Bok-nam (Real Name: Yi Gyeong-bu) - Originally from Hanseong, Joseon (Currently Seoul, South Korea)
