= Mokuto-Ō =

Prince of Baekje

- Hangul: 목도왕
- Hanja: 目圖王/目図王
- Revised Romanization: Mokdowang
- McCune–Reischauer: Moktowang

Buyeo Mokdo (目圖王, ? – ?) was a prince of Baekje, one of the Three Kingdoms of Korea. He was the grandson of Seong of Baekje. According to the Shinsen Shōjiroku he settled in Japan and became ancestor of the Oka no muraji clan (岡連氏).

== Family ==
- Father: 3rd son of the 26th King, Seong of Baekje
  - Mokdo (目圖王, ?–?) - grandson of King Seong, the Japanese reading of his name is "Mokuto". He is ancestor of the Oka no muraji clan (岡連氏).
    - Son: Oka no muraji no Anki (岡連安貴, ?–?) - known in Baekje as Angwi.

== See also ==
- Seong of Baekje
- Gwisil
- Gwisil Boksin
- Gwisil Jipsa
- History of Korea
- Three Kingdoms of Korea
- List of Monarchs of Korea
