= Mintōren =

Advocacy group for Koreans in Japan

Mintohren

Short name in Japanese
- Kanji: 民闘連
- Kana: みんとうれん
Transcriptions
- Romanization: Mintōren

Long name in Japanese
- Kanji: 民族差別と闘う連絡協議会
- Kana: みんぞくさべつとたたかうれんらくきょうぎかい
Transcriptions
- Romanization: Minzoku Sabetsu to Tatakau Renraku Kyōgikai

Short name in Korean
- Hangul: 민투련
- Hanja: 民闘連
Transcriptions
- Revised Romanization: Minturyeon
- McCune–Reischauer: Mint'uryŏn

Long name in Korean
- Hangul: 민족차별과 투쟁하는 연결협의회
- Hanja: 民族差別과 鬪爭하는 連絡協議會
Transcriptions
- Revised Romanization: Minjok Chabyeolgwa Tujaenghaneun Yeongyeol Hyeobuihoe
- McCune–Reischauer: Minjok Ch'abyŏlgwa T'ujaenghanŭn Yŏn'gyŏl Hyŏbŭihoe

The Young Koreans Against Ethnic Discrimination in Japan (Japanese: 民族差別と闘う連絡協議会), abbreviated as Mintohren or Mintōren, is a grass-roots movement created by young Koreans in Japan ("Zainichi Koreans") to combat ethnic discrimination by encouraging a multicultural and positive approach to integration of Koreans into Japanese society.

The movement started in the 1970s as a joint effort of three groups: Mukuge no Kai, founded by Lee Kyung-jae in 1972 in Osaka, Tokkabi Kodomo Kai, founded in 1974 in Osaka, and Seikyu Sha, founded in 1974 in Tokyo. In 1985, they began a campaign in Takatsuki, Osaka Prefecture which resulted in the establishment of a division in the city board of education devoted exclusively to education for ethnic Koreans, and the elimination of the requirement that city employees hold Japanese nationality. They also played an important role in the 1980s struggle against the requirement that all foreign residents, including Special Permanent Residents like the Zainichi Koreans, give their fingerprints to police; they organised refusers from different parts of Japan, as well as providing information and increasing awareness of their campaign.

In contrast to the South Korean-affiliated Mindan and North Korean-affiliated Chongryon, Mintohren emphasises local identities and issues, and rejects the idea that Zainichi Koreans are foreigners with a homeland in Korea and should concern themselves with problems of Korean politics. Instead, they highlight the fact that Zainichi Koreans were born and raised in Japan and intend to continue to make it their home.
