= Lee Kyung-jae =

Zainichi Korean politician (born 1954)

Japanese name
- Kanji: 李敬宰
- Kana: イ・キョンジェ
Transcriptions
- Romanization: I Kyonje

Korean name
- Hangul: 이경재
- Hanja: 李敬宰
Transcriptions
- Revised Romanization: I Gyeongjae
- McCune–Reischauer: I Kyŏngjae

Lee Kyung-jae, also known as I Kyonje, Yi Gyeong-jae, or Yi Kyŏngjae (born 1954 in Takatsuki, Osaka Prefecture) is an ethnic Korean community organiser in Japan.

== Early life ==
Born to Zainichi Korean parents holding South Korean nationality, Kyung-jae grew up in Nariai in Takatsuki, a small village of around 35 Korean families. His father was a day labourer, while his mother worked in a quarry. Both were illiterate in Japanese and Korean. Further more, his mother, who had immigrated to Japan at the age of three, had forgotten how to speak Korean, and as a result, their home language was exclusively Japanese.

Lee was given the name legal alias Ri Keisai and grew up being ashamed of his Korean background and due to his poverty. He revealed his Korean name to his classmates at his middle school graduation but retained a strong desire to assimilate to the point of "hatred" towards Koreans and blaming his family's poverty on his parents' laziness. This was a state of mind which was overcome by the intervention of a teacher, who raised the issue of anti-Korean discrimination, and the support and acceptance of Japanese friends. However, upon later entering a private high school he resumed the use of the Japanese name, Takayasu Keisai, and again hid his ethnicity.

== Political career ==
After Lee graduated from high school in 1972, his former teachers provided him with no assistance in finding a job. While supporting himself through part-time work, he founded Mukuge no Kai, one of the predecessor organisations of Mintohren. The name came from mukuge, the Japanese word for hibiscus syriacus, a former symbol of resistance to Japanese colonial rule in Korea and the national flower of South Korea. He hoped to address the problems of violence and delinquency among Korean youth in Osaka; he chose to found a new association rather than work through existing ethnic associations such as Mindan or Chongryon because he felt both were more concerned with the politics of the Korean Peninsula than of local Korean communities in Japan. Though at first they made little progress, their children's programme, founded in 1978, in Nariai was particularly successful; in 1985, they began a campaign which resulted in the establishment of a division in the city board of education devoted exclusively to education for ethnic Koreans, and the elimination of the requirement that city employees hold Japanese nationality.

In 2006, Lee naturalised as a Japanese citizen in order to run for a position in the assembly of Osaka Prefecture. Running from his hometown, the Takatsuki electoral district, he estimated that he would require 13,000 votes to gain a seat. Though in the past, he had held on to his South Korean nationality as an expression of his identity, and joined campaigns demanding suffrage for foreign residents, he naturalised for the express purpose of representing foreign residents and other minorities in local politics. If elected, he would have been Osaka's first ethnic Korean assembly member; he hoped that his campaign would provide an opportunity for Koreans who had taken up Japanese nationality to strengthen their ethnic identity and express it openly to the society at large. However, in the end, out of six candidates competing for five seats, he came in last, with only 2,543 votes out of 127,646 cast (compared to 19,475 for the fifth-place candidate).

== See also ==
- List of naturalized Japanese politicians
