= Koreans in Japan =

Japanese residents of Korean origin or descent

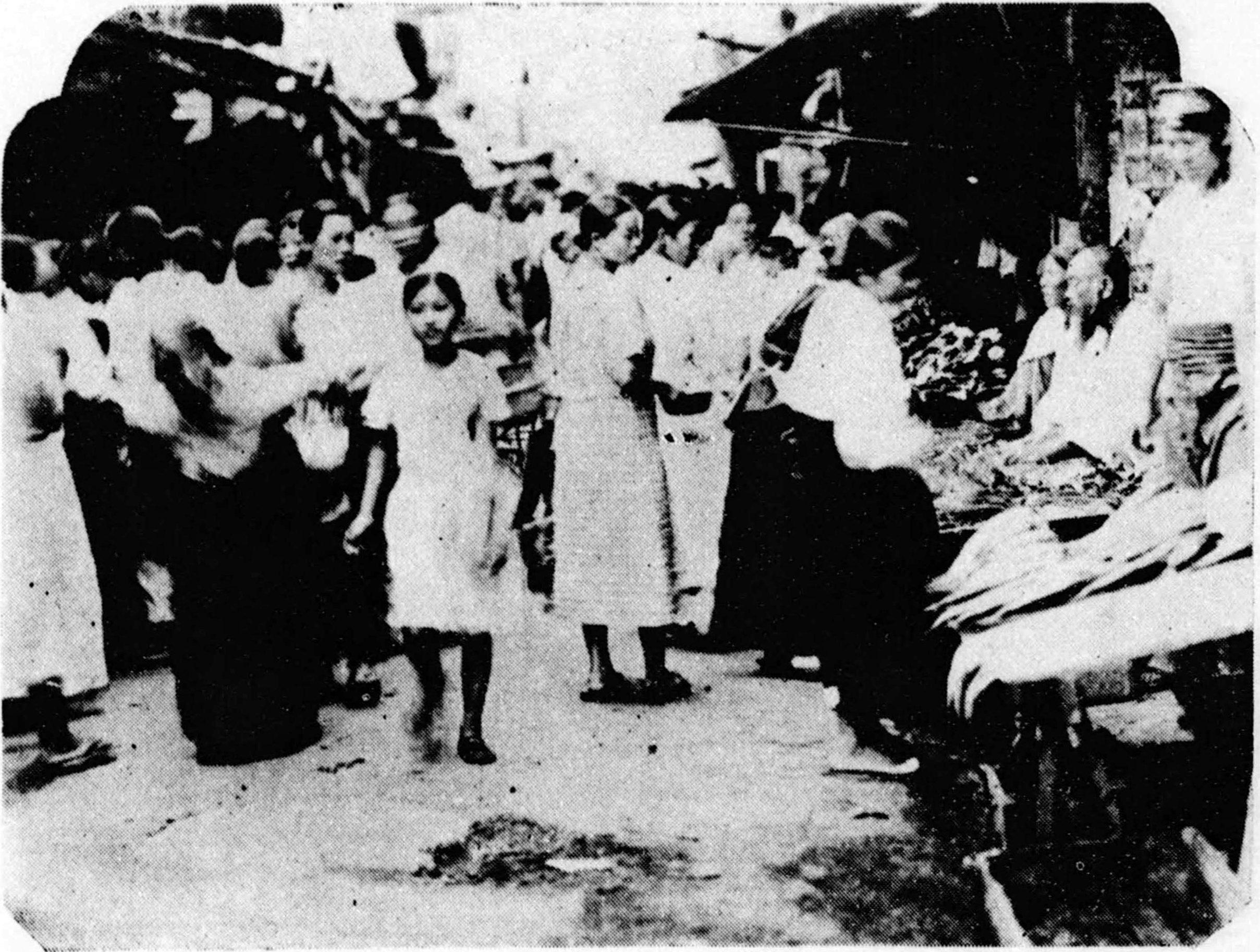
- Koreans in Osaka, Japan in 1938

Total population
- 1,000,000 (total population including Koreans with Japanese citizenship): 429,542 (only including Korean citizens living in Japan in December 2025); South Korea: 407,341 (in December 2025); North Korea: 22,201 (December 2025); Details: Special Permanent Residents: 281,295 people; General permanent residents: 75,771 people; Technology/humanities/international services: 24,298 people; Study abroad: 14,906 people; Japanese spouse, etc.: 11,907 people; Family stay: 9,108 people; Permanent resident: 7,224 people; Business and management: 2,681 people; Specific activities: 2,013 people; Spouse of permanent resident: 2,109 people

Regions with significant populations
- Tokyo (Toshima, Shinjuku, Minato, Nishitokyo, Chiyoda, Shibuya, Shinagawa, Nakano, Setagaya) · Kanagawa Prefecture (Yokohama) · Osaka Prefecture (Osaka) · Hyōgo Prefecture (Kobe) · Kyoto Prefecture (Kyoto) · Aichi Prefecture (Kitanagoya) · Shiga Prefecture (Maibara) · Fukuoka Prefecture (Chūō-ku)

Languages
- Japanese · Korean (normal and Zainichi Korean) · Jeju

Religion
- Buddhism · Shinto · Korean shamanism · Christianity · Irreligion

Related ethnic groups
- Other Koreans, especially Sakhalin Koreans

Koreans in Japan

North Korean name
- Chosŏn'gŭl: 재일 조선인
- Hancha: 在日朝鮮人
Transcriptions
- Revised Romanization: Jaeil Joseonin
- McCune–Reischauer: Chaeil Chosŏnin

South Korean name
- Hangul: 재일 한국인
- Hanja: 在日韓國人
Transcriptions
- Revised Romanization: Jaeil Hangugin
- McCune–Reischauer: Chaeil Han'gugin

Japanese name
- Kanji: 在日韓国・朝鮮人
- Kana: ざいにちかんこく・ちょうせんじん
Transcriptions
- Romanization: Zainichi Kankoku/Chōsenjin

Koreans constitute the second largest ethnic minority group in Japan after Chinese immigrants. The majority of Koreans in Japan are Zainichi Koreans, (Note: Japanese: 在日韓国・朝鮮人, romanized: Zainichi Kankoku/Chōsenjin; Korean: 재일 한국/조선인) often known simply as Zainichi: ethnic Koreans who immigrated to Japan during the Japanese rule of Korea and are citizens or permanent residents of Japan, and their descendants. Other waves of Korean immigration have occurred, both before and after, most recently during the 1980s.

== Terminology ==
The term Zainichi Korean refers only to long-term Korean residents of Japan who trace their roots to Korea under Japanese rule, distinguishing them from the later wave of Korean migrants who came mostly in the 1980s, and from pre-modern immigrants dating back to antiquity, possibly including the Yayoi people who constitute the biggest ancestral group of the Japanese people. Zainichi Koreans are a distinct group from South Korean nationals who have immigrated to Japan since the end of World War II and the division of Korea.

The Japanese word Zainichi (在日; lit. 'in Japan') itself means a foreign citizen "staying in Japan", and implies temporary residence. Nevertheless, the term "Zainichi Korean" is used to describe settled permanent residents of Japan, both those who have retained their Joseon, North Korean or South Korean nationalities, and even sometimes includes Japanese citizens of Korean descent who acquired Japanese nationality by naturalization or by birth from one or both parents who have Japanese citizenship.

Korean Japanese refers to Koreans residing in Japan who hold Japanese nationality, rather than South Korean or North Korean nationality. In everyday usage, the term is sometimes discussed alongside Zainichi Koreans, although some sources continue to distinguish between kankoku (韓国) and chōsen (朝鮮) due to the continued presence of residents who retain chōsen-seki (朝鮮籍) or are affiliated with Chongryon.

== Population ==
Many commentary has advanced broader estimates for the total number of people of Korean descent in Japan when including naturalized Japanese citizens and their descendants. A Chosun Ilbo article, drawing on reporting based on Tokyo correspondent observations and interviews, described figures in the range of four million as commonly cited and presented roughly four million as a realistic estimate. The same commentary also stated that Mindan (the Korean Residents Union in Japan), an organization representing portions of the Zainichi Korean community and supported by the government of the Republic of Korea, has cited a similar estimate.

The Zainichi population declined significantly due to death, returning to Korea, and assimilating into the general Japanese population.

According to the Ministry of Justice, 407,341 South Koreans and 22,201 North Koreans (朝鮮人, Chōsen-jin; meaning Koreans in Japanese) were registered as permanent or non-permanent residents of Japan in 2025. Below, two statistics on the numbers of foreign residents living in Japan are displayed, one map and one chart:

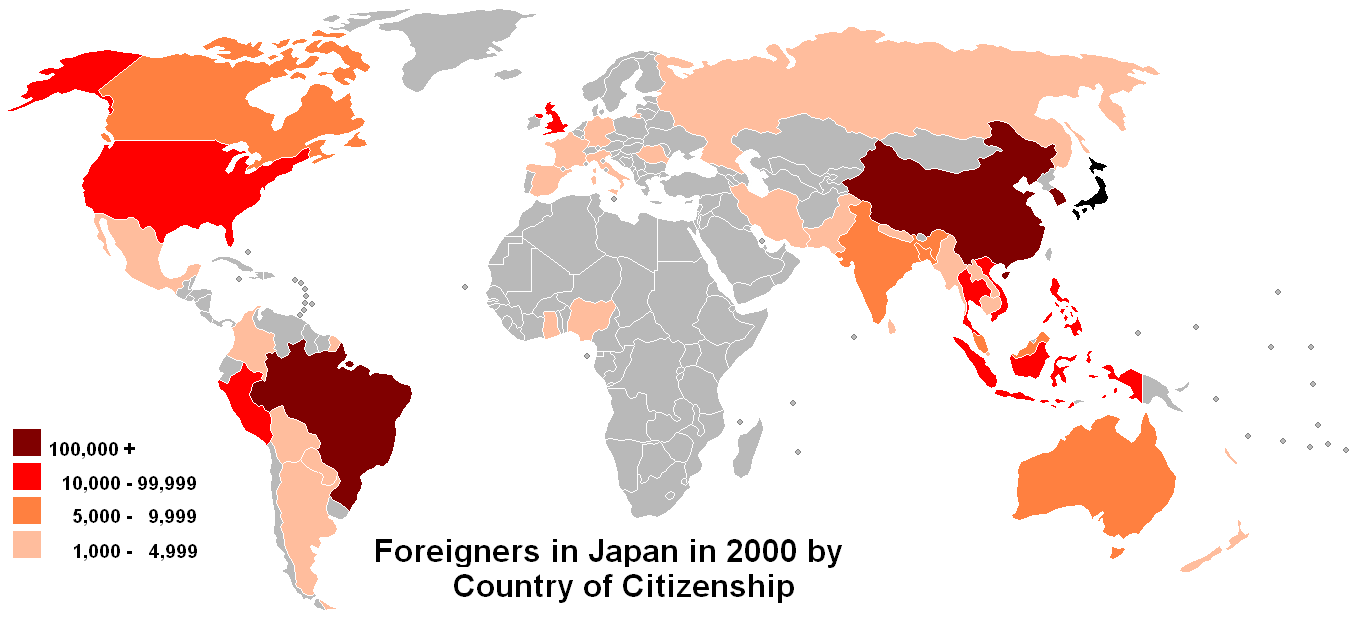
The map of foreign residents living in Japan as of the year 2000.

The chart of foreign residents living in Japan.

== History ==
=== Overview ===
The modern flow of Koreans to Japan started with the Japan-Korea Treaty of 1876 and increased dramatically after 1920. During World War II, a large number of Koreans were also conscripted by Japan. Another wave of migration started after South Korea was devastated by the Korean War in the 1950s. Also noteworthy was the large number of refugees from the massacres on Jeju Island by the South Korean government.

Statistics regarding Zainichi immigration are scarce. However, in 1988, a Mindan youth group called Zainihon Daikan Minkoku Seinendan (Note: Korean: 재일본대한민국청년회, Japanese: 在日本大韓民国青年会) published a report titled, "Father, tell us about that day. Report to reclaim our history" . (Note: Japanese: アボジ聞かせて あの日のことを—我々の歴史を取り戻す運動報告書) The report included a survey of first-generation Koreans' reasons for immigration. The result was 13.3% for conscription, 39.6% for economics, 17.3% for marriage and family, 9.5% for study/academic, 20.2% for other reasons and 0.2% unknown. The survey excluded those who were under 12 when they arrived in Japan.

=== Pre-modern era ===
While some families can currently trace their ancestry back to pre-modern Korean immigrants, many families were absorbed into Japanese society and as a result, they are not considered a distinct group. The same is applicable to those families which are descended from Koreans who entered Japan in subsequent periods of pre-modern Japanese history. Trade with Korea continued to modern times, with Japan also periodically receiving missions from Korea, though this activity was often limited to specific ports.

==== Yayoi period ====
In late prehistory, in the Iron Age Yayoi period (300 BCE to 300 CE), Japanese culture showed some Korean influence, though whether this was accompanied by immigration from Korea is debated (see Origin of the Yayoi people).

==== Kofun period (250 to 538) ====
In the later Kofun (250–538 CE) and Asuka (538–710 CE) periods, there was some flow of people from the Korean Peninsula, both as immigrants and long-term visitors, notably a number of clans in the Kofun period (see Kofun period Korean migration). While some families today can ultimately trace their ancestry to the immigrants, they were generally absorbed into Japanese society and are not considered a distinct modern group.

==== Heian period (794 to 1185) ====
According to the Nihon Kōki historical text, in 814, six people, including a Silla man called Karanunofurui (Korean: 가라포고이, Japanese: 加羅布古伊; presumed to be of gaya descent) became naturalized in Japan's Minokuni region.

==== Sengoku period (1467 to 1615) ====
Some 60-70,000 Koreans were taken to Japan as prisoners of war during the 1592–1598 Japanese invasions of Korea. Notable individuals include Kang Hang.

==== Edo period (1603 to 1867) ====
In the Edo period, trade with Korea occurred through the Tsushima-Fuchū Domain in Kyūshū, near Nagasaki.

=== Before World War II ===
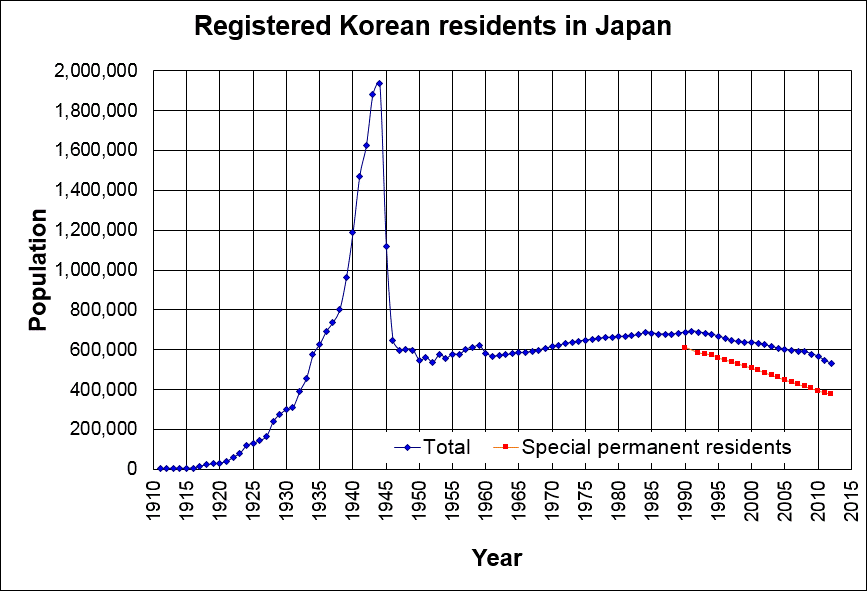
Restrictions of passage from the Korean Peninsula (April 1919–1922), the 1923 Great Kantō earthquake, restrictions of passage from Busan (October 1925), opening of independent travel service by Koreans between Jeju and Osaka (April 1930), Park Choon-Geum was elected for the House of Representatives of Japan (February 1932), removal of restrictions of civil recruit from the Korean Peninsula (September 1939), public recruit from the Korean Peninsula (March 1942), labor conscription from the Korean Peninsula (September 1944), the end of WWII and the beginning of repatriation (1945), the Jeju uprising (April 1948), the Korean War (June 1950), the Home-coming Movement to North Korea (December 1959–1983), the Treaty on Basic Relations between Japan and the Republic of Korea (1965), (1977–1983), Japanese ratification of the Convention Relating to the Status of Refugees (1982), the 1988 Summer Olympics in Seoul, South Korea, the 1997 Asian financial crisis

After the conclusion of the Japan-Korea Treaty of 1876, Korean students and asylum seekers started to come to Japan, including Korean politicians and activists Pak Yŏnghyo, Kim Okkyun, and Song Pyŏngjun. There were about 800 Koreans living in Japan before Japan annexed Korea. In 1910, as the result of the Japan–Korea Annexation Treaty, Japan annexed Korea, and all Korean people became part of the nation of the Empire of Japan by law and received Japanese citizenship.

In the 1920s, the demand for labor in Japan was high while Koreans had difficulty finding jobs in the Korean peninsula. As a result, thousands of Koreans migrated or were recruited to work in industries like coal mining. A majority of the immigrants consisted of farmers from the southern part of Korea. The number of Koreans in Japan in 1930 was more than ten times greater than that of 1920, reaching 419,000. However, the jobs they could get on the mainland of Japan were curtailed by open discrimination and largely limited to physical labor due to their poor education; they usually worked alongside other groups of ethnic minorities subject to discrimination, such as burakumin.

Before World War II, the Japanese government tried to reduce the number of Koreans immigrating to Japan. To accomplish this, the Japanese government devoted resources to the Korean peninsula.

=== During World War II ===
In 1939, the Japanese government introduced the National Mobilization Law and conscripted Koreans to deal with labor shortages due to World War II. In 1944, the Japanese authorities extended the mobilization of Japanese civilians for labor on the Korean peninsula. Of the 5,400,000 Koreans conscripted, about 670,000 were taken to mainland Japan (including Karafuto Prefecture, present-day Sakhalin, now part of Russia) for civilian labor. Those who were brought to Japan were forced to work in factories, in mines, and as laborers, often under appalling conditions. About 60,000 are estimated to have died between 1939 and 1945. Most of the wartime laborers returned home after the war, but some elected to remain in Japan. 43,000 of those in Karafuto, which had been occupied by the Soviet Union just before Japan's surrender, were refused repatriation to either mainland Japan or the Korean Peninsula, and were thus trapped in Sakhalin, stateless; they became the ancestors of the Sakhalin Koreans.

=== After World War II ===
Koreans entered Japan illegally post-World War II due to an unstable political and economic situation in Korea, with 20,000 to 40,000 Koreans fleeing Syngman Rhee's forces during the Jeju uprising in 1948. The Yeosu-Suncheon rebellion also increased the illegal immigration to Japan. It is estimated that between 1946 and 1949, 90% of illegal immigrants to Japan were Koreans. During the Korean War, Korean immigrants came to Japan to avoid torture or murder at the hands of dictator Syngman Rhee's forces (e.g., in the Bodo League massacre).

Fishers and brokers helped immigrants enter Japan through Tsushima Island. In the 1950s, Japan Coast Guard secured the border with Korea, but apprehending illegal immigrants was difficult because they were armed, while Japan Coast Guard was not due to the terms of the surrender of Japan after World War II. During this period, one-fifth of the immigrants were arrested.

In Official Correspondence of 1949, Shigeru Yoshida, the prime minister of Japan, proposed the deportation of all Zainichi Koreans to Douglas MacArthur, the American Supreme Commander of the Allied Powers, and said the Japanese government would pay all of the cost. Yoshida stated that it was unfair for Japan to purchase food for illegal Zainichi Koreans, claiming that they did not contribute to the Japanese economy and that they supposedly committed political crimes by cooperating with communists.

=== Loss of Japanese nationality ===
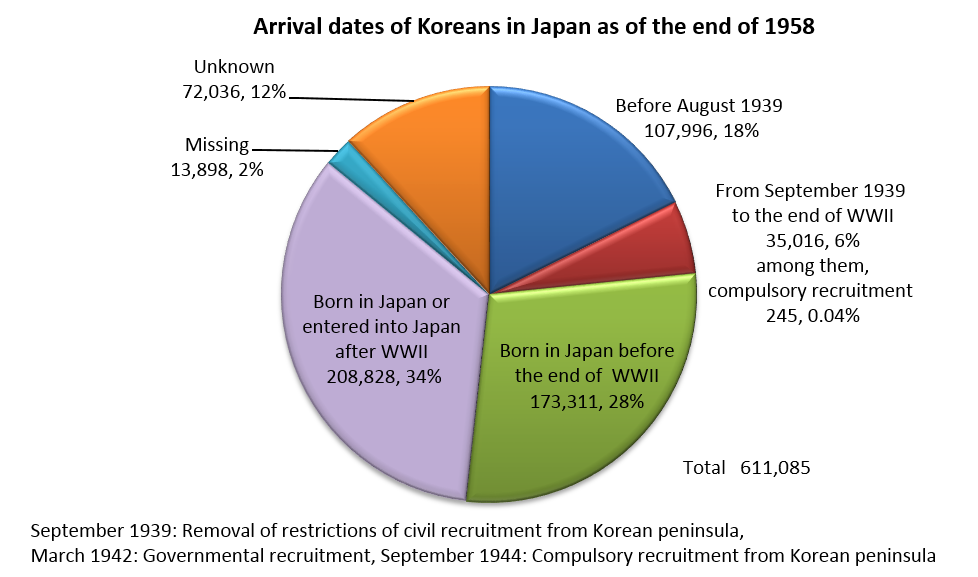
Dates of entrance or birth of Korean residents in Japan as of the end of 1958

Immediately following the end of World War II, there were roughly 2.4 million Koreans in Japan; the majority repatriated to their ancestral homes in the southern half of the Korean Peninsula, leaving only 650,000 in Japan by 1946.

Japan's defeat in the war and the end of its colonization of the Korean Peninsula and Taiwan left the nationality status of Koreans and Taiwanese in an ambiguous position in terms of law. The Alien Registration Ordinance (外国人登録令, Gaikokujin-tōroku-rei) of 2 May 1947 ruled that Koreans and some Taiwanese were to be provisionally treated as foreign nationals. Given the lack of a single, unified government on the Korean Peninsula, Koreans were provisionally registered under the name of Joseon (조선, Japanese: Chōsen, 朝鮮), the old name of undivided Korea.

In 1948, the northern and southern parts of Korea declared independence individually, making Joseon, or the old undivided Korea, a defunct nation. The new government of South Korea made a request to the Supreme Commander of the Allied Powers, then the occupying power of Japan, to change the nationality registration of Zainichi Koreans to Daehan Minguk (Korean: 대한민국; Japanese: 大韓民国, romanized: Daikan Minkoku), the official name of the new nation. Following this, from 1950 onwards, Zainichi Koreans were allowed to voluntarily re-register their nationality as such.

The Allied occupation of Japan ended on 28 April 1952 with the San Francisco Peace Treaty, in which Japan formally abandoned its territorial claim to the Korean Peninsula, and as a result, Zainichi Koreans formally lost their Japanese nationality.

The division on the Korean Peninsula led to division among Koreans in Japan. Mindan, the Korean Residents Union in Japan, was set up in 1946 as a pro-South offshoot of Chōren (League of Koreans in Japan), the main Korean residents' organisation, which had a socialist ideology. Following the May Day riots of 1952, the pro-North organisation was made illegal, but it re-formed under various guises and went on to form the "General Association of Korean Residents in Japan", or Chongryon, in 1955. This organisation kept to its socialist, and by extension pro-North stance, and enjoyed the active financial support of the North Korean government.

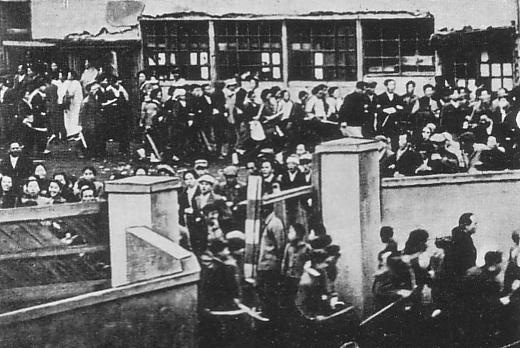
The second Kobe riots in 1950

In 1965, Japan concluded a Treaty on Basic Relations with the Republic of Korea and recognized the South Korean government as the only legitimate government of the peninsula. Those Koreans in Japan who did not apply for South Korean citizenship kept Chōsen-seki which did not give them citizenship of any nation.

=== Newcomers ===
Starting in 1980, South Korea allowed its students to study abroad freely; starting in 1987, people older than forty-four were allowed to travel abroad. One year after the 1988 Seoul Olympics, traveling abroad was further liberalized. When Expo 2005 was held, the Japanese government had a visa waiver program with South Korea for a limited period under the condition that the visitor's purpose was sightseeing or business, and later extended it permanently. Korean enclaves tend to exclude newcomers from existing Korean organizations, especially Mindan, so newcomers have created a new one called The Federation of Korean Associations, Japan.

In recent years, there has been a noticeable shift in the perception of Zainichi Koreans in Japan, largely influenced by the growing popularity of Korean culture, known as the "Korean Wave", or Hallyu. This cultural phenomenon, encompassing Korean music, television dramas, films, and cuisine, has gained widespread attention not only in Japan but also globally. As a result, there has been an increased appreciation for Korean culture among the Japanese population, leading to greater interest in Zainichi Koreans and their heritage.

The Korean Wave has played a significant role in bridging cultural gaps and fostering greater acceptance of Zainichi Koreans in Japanese society. K-pop music groups, such as EXO, Twice and BLACKPINK, have garnered massive followings in Japan, garnering interest in Korean entertainment. Similarly, Korean dramas and films have found a dedicated audience in Japan, contributing to the normalization of Korean culture within mainstream Japanese media.

Furthermore, economic opportunities have also contributed to a recent influx of Korean newcomers to Japan. Despite historical tensions between the two countries, Japan remains an attractive destination for many South Koreans seeking employment and business prospects. The close geographical proximity and strong economic ties between Japan and South Korea have facilitated increased migration and investment between the two nations.

Japan's aging population and labor shortages in certain industries have created demand for foreign workers, including Koreans. Many Korean nationals have sought employment opportunities in sectors such as manufacturing, technology, healthcare, and hospitality, contributing to Japan's workforce and economy.

== Repatriation to Korea ==
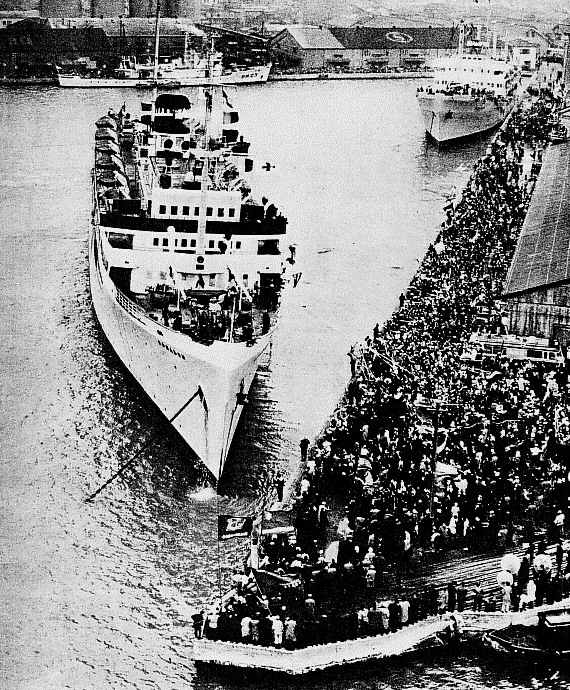
Repatriation of Koreans from Japan, January 1960

Repatriation of Zainichi Koreans from Japan conducted under the auspices of the Japanese Red Cross began to receive official support from the Japanese government as early as 1956. A North Korean-sponsored repatriation programme with support of the Chōsen Sōren (The General Association of Korean Residents in Japan) officially began in 1959. In April 1959, Gorō Terao (寺尾 五郎 Terao Gorō), a political activist and historian of the Japanese Communist Party, published the book, North of the 38th Parallel (Japanese: 38度線の北), in which he praised North Korea for its rapid development and humanitarianism. Following its publication, numbers of returnees skyrocketed. The Japanese government was in favour of repatriation as a way to rid the country of ethnic minority residents that were discriminated against and regarded as incompatible with Japanese culture. Though the United States government was initially unaware of Tokyo's cooperation with the repatriation programme, they offered no objection after they were informed of it; the US ambassador to Japan was quoted by his Australian counterpart as describing the Koreans in Japan as, "a poor lot including many Communists and many criminals".

Despite the fact that 97% of the Zainichi Koreans originated from the southern half of the Korean Peninsula, the North was initially a far more popular destination for repatriation than the South. Approximately 70,000 Zainichi repatriated to North Korea during a two-year period from 1960 through 1961. With the 1965 normalization of Japan-South Korea relations, the popularity of repatriation to the North dropped sharply, though the trickle of returnees to the North continued as late as 1984. In total, 93,340 people migrated from Japan to North Korea under the repatriation programme; an estimated 6,000 were Japanese migrating with Korean spouses. Around one hundred such repatriates are believed to have later escaped from North Korea. One of them was Kang Chol-hwan, who published a book about his experience, The Aquariums of Pyongyang. One returnee who later defected back to Japan, known only by his Japanese pseudonym Kenki Aoyama, worked for North Korean intelligence as a spy in Beijing.

The repatriations have been the subject of numerous creative works in Japan, due to the influence they had on the Zainichi Korean community. One documentary film about a family whose sons repatriated while the parents and daughter remained in Japan, Dear Pyongyang, won a special jury prize at the 2006 Sundance Film Festival.

Some Zainichi Koreans have gone to South Korea to study or to settle. For example, author Lee Yangji studied at Seoul National University in the early 1980s.

== Organizations – Chongryon and Mindan ==
=== Division between Chongryon and Mindan ===
Well into at least the 1970s, Chongryon was the dominant Zainichi group, and in some ways remains more politically significant today in Japan. However, the widening disparity between the political and economic conditions of the two Koreas has since made Mindan, the pro-South Korean group, the larger and less politically controversial faction. 65% of Zainichi are now said to be affiliated to Mindan. The number of pupils receiving ethnic education from Chongryon-affiliated schools has declined sharply, with many, if not most, Zainichi now opting to send their children to mainstream Japanese schools. Some Chongryon schools have been closed for lack of funding, and there is serious doubt as to the continuing viability of the system as a whole. Mindan has also traditionally operated a school system for the children of its members, although it has always been less widespread and organized compared to its Chongryon counterpart, and is said to be nearly defunct at the present time.

=== Chongryon ===
Out of the two Korean organizations in Japan, the pro-North Chongryon has been the more militant in terms of retaining Koreans' ethnic identity. Its policies have included:

- operation of about 60 ethnic Korean schools across Japan, initially partly funded by the North Korean government, in which lessons are conducted in Korean. They maintain a strong pro-North Korean ideology, which has sometimes come under criticism from pupils, parents, and the public alike;
- discouraging its members from taking up Japanese citizenship;
- discouraging its members from marrying Japanese;
- operation of businesses and banks to provide the necessary jobs, services, and social networks for Zainichi Koreans outside mainstream society;
- opposition to Zainichi Koreans' right to vote or participate in Japanese elections, which is seen as an unacceptable attempt at assimilation into Japanese society;
- and a home-coming movement to North Korea in the late 1950s, which it hailed as a socialist "Paradise on Earth", with some 90,000 Zainichi Koreans and their Japanese spouses moving to the North before the migration eventually died down.

==== Controversies over Chongryon ====
For a long time, Chongryon enjoyed unofficial immunity from searches and investigations, partly because authorities were reluctant to carry out any actions which could provoke not only accusations of xenophobia but lead to an international incident. Chongryon has long been suspected of a variety of criminal acts on behalf of North Korea, such as illegal transfer of funds to North Korea and espionage, but no action has been taken. However, recently escalating tensions between Japan and North Korea over a number of issues, namely North Korea's abduction of Japanese nationals which came to light in 2002 as well as its nuclear weapons program, has led to a resurgence of public animosity against Chongryon. Chongryon schools have alleged numerous cases of verbal abuse and physical violence directed against their students and buildings, and Chongryon facilities have been targets of protests and occasional incidents. The Japanese authorities have recently started to crack down on Chongryon, with investigations and arrests for charges ranging from tax evasion to espionage. These moves are usually criticized by Chongryon as acts of political suppression.

In December 2001, police raided Chongryon's Tokyo headquarters and related facilities to investigate Chongryon officials' suspected role in embezzlement of funds from the failed Tokyo Chogin credit union.

In 2002, Shotaro Tochigi, deputy head of the Public Security Investigation Agency, told a session of the House of Representatives Financial Affairs Committee that the agency was investigating Chongryon for suspected illicit transfers of funds to the North. The image of Chongryon was further tarnished by North Korea's surprise 2002 admission that it had indeed abducted Japanese nationals in the 1970s, even after it had categorically and fiercely denied for many years that the abductions had ever taken place and dismissed rumors of North Korean involvement as an allegedly "racist fantasy". Some of the recent drop in membership of Chongryon is attributed to ordinary members of Chongryon who may have believed in the party line feeling deeply humiliated and disillusioned upon discovering that they had been used as mouthpieces to deny the crimes of the North Korean government.

In March 2006, police raided six Chongryon-related facilities in an investigation into the circumstances surrounding the June 1980 disappearance of one of the alleged abductees, Tadaaki Hara. Police spokesmen said that the head of Chongryon at the time was suspected of co-operating in his kidnapping.

The operation of the Mangyongbong-92 (currently suspended), a North Korean ferry that is the only regular direct link between North Korea and Japan, is a subject of significant tension, as the ferry is primarily used by Chongryon to send its members to North Korea and to supply North Korea with money and goods donated by the organization and its members. In 2003, a North Korean defector made a statement to the US Senate committee stating that more than 90% of the parts used by North Korea to construct its missiles were brought from Japan aboard the ship.

In May 2006, Chongryon and the pro-South Mindan agreed to reconcile, only for the agreement to break down the following month. North Korea's missile tests in July 2006 deepened the divide, with Chongryon refusing to condemn the missile tests, expressing only its regret that the Japanese government has suspended the operation of the Mangyongbong-92. Outraged senior Mindan officials joined mainstream Japanese politicians and media in sharply criticizing Chongryon's silence over the matter.

== Integration into Japanese society ==
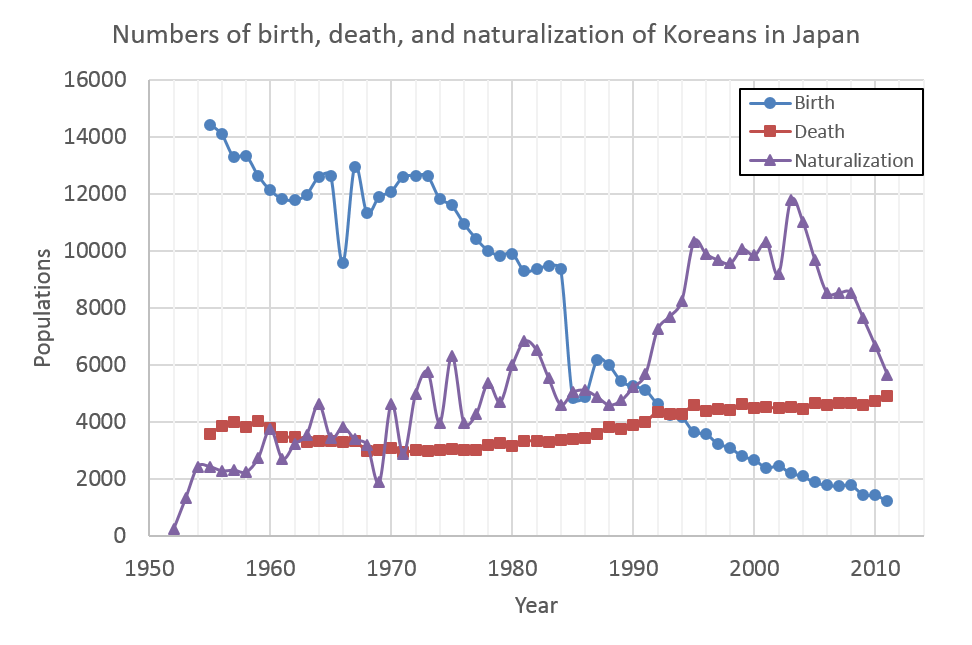
Numbers of birth, death, and naturalization of Koreans in Japan

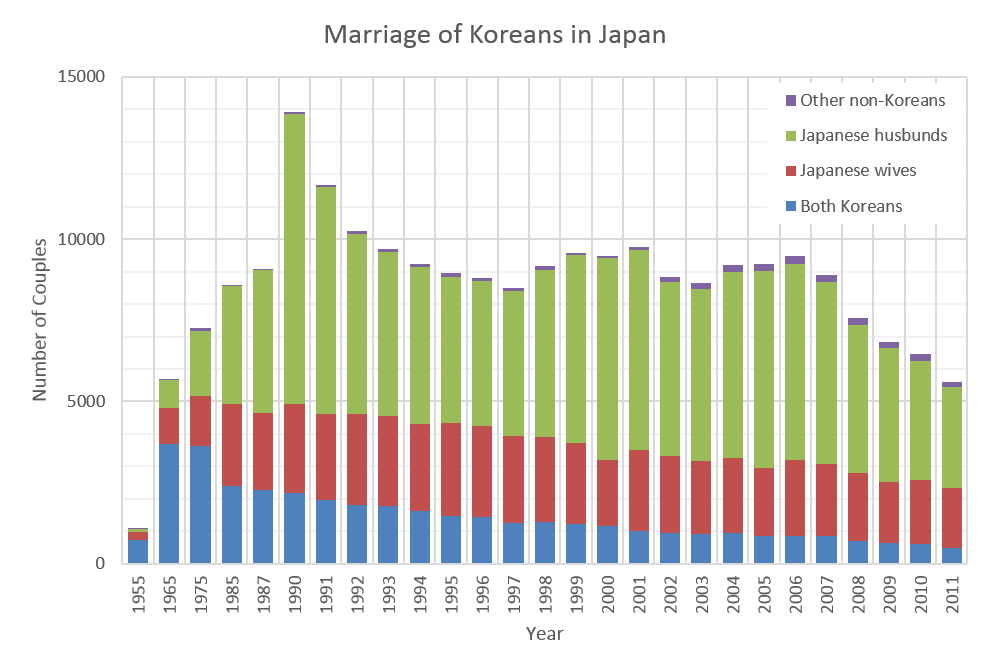
Marriage of Koreans in Japan

During the post-World War II period, Zainichi Koreans faced various kinds of discrimination from Japanese society. Due to the San Francisco Peace Treaty, the Japanese government created laws to support Japanese citizens by giving financial support, providing shelters, etc. However, after the treaty was signed, Zainichi Koreans were no longer counted as Japanese citizens, so they were unable to get any support from the government. They were unable to get an insurance certificate from the government, so it was difficult for them to get any medical care. Without medical insurance, Zainichi Koreans were unable to go to the hospital since the cost of medication was too high.

Another problem caused by this treaty was that the Japanese government created a law which stated that Korean residents in Japan had to be fingerprinted since Zainichi Koreans had two names (their original name and a name given by the Japanese government). Under this law, Zainichi Koreans had to reveal their identity to the public because when they visited the city hall to provide their fingerprints, their neighbors found out that they were Zainichi Koreans. Therefore, Zainichi Koreans were forced to reveal their identity to Japanese and faced discrimination from them. This made their lives even more difficult. In order to protect themselves, many Zainichi Koreans protested against this law. Mindan and many Zainichi Koreans opposed this law, but the law wasn't repealed until 1993. Until then, Zainichi Koreans could not escape from the social discrimination which they had faced in Japanese society.

=== Discrimination ===
Furthermore, it was hard for the Zainichi Koreans to get a job due to discrimination. Zainichi Koreans were often forced into low-wage labor, lived in segregated communities, and faced barriers to their cultural and social practices. Especially, it was very hard for Zainichi Koreans to become public employees since Japan only let Japanese nationals become public employees at that time. Even of those who were able to secure jobs, many ended up working in coal mines, construction sites, and factories under harsh conditions that were markedly worse than those endured by their Japanese counterparts. The disparity was not limited to wages alone; Koreans also faced longer working hours and were subjected to physical abuse by supervisors who enforced strict discipline to maximize productivity. Since many Zainichi Koreans could not get a proper job, they began to get involved in illegal jobs such as "illegal alcohol production, scrap recycling, and racketeering". As a result, many Zainichi Koreans ended up living in slums or hamlets, a situation aided by Japanese real estate agents' refusal to let Zainichi Koreans rent houses.

In addition to labor exploitation and housing discrimination, Koreans also endured significant social discrimination. They were segregated into specific neighborhoods, commonly referred to as "Korean Towns," (which still exist today in Shin-Ōkubo and Ikuno-ku) where living conditions were poor, sanitation was inadequate, and access to public services like healthcare and education was severely limited. Korean children faced bullying and discrimination in schools, which often led to high dropout rates and limited their educational and, subsequently, economic opportunities.

Despite these adversities, the Zainichi community has fought for their rights and has seen gradual improvements in their status in Japan. Changes in legal and social recognition began to emerge towards the late 20th century, influenced by both domestic advocacy by human rights groups and international pressure.

Zainichi today have established a stable presence in Japan after years of activism. Through Mintohren, community support by Zainichi organizations (Mindan and Chongryon, among others), other minority groups (Ainu, burakumin, Ryūkyūans, Nivkhs, and others), and sympathetic Japanese, the social atmosphere for Zainichi in Japan has improved. There are also Koreans living in Japan who try to present themselves as Japanese to avoid discrimination. Most younger Zainichi now speak only Japanese, go to Japanese schools, work for Japanese firms, and increasingly marry Japanese people. Most naturalization occurs among the young during the period when they seek formal employment or marriage. Those who have already established their lives increasingly do not choose to retain their South Korean or Joseon nationality or heritage and lead average lives alongside other Japanese. This, as well as marriage to Japanese nationals, is leading to a sharp decrease in the original "Zainichi" population in Japan.

=== Assimilation ===
One of the most pressing issues of the Zainichi community is the rate of assimilation of Zainichi into Japan. About 3,000 to 4,000 Koreans naturalize in Japan every year out of slightly less than 429,000. Naturalization carries a crucial cultural aspect in Japan, as both Mindan and Chongryon link Korean ethnic identity to Korean nationality, and Japanese and South Korean nationality laws do not allow multiple citizenship for adults. By their definition, opting for a Japanese passport means becoming Japanese, rather than Korean-Japanese.

In order to be naturalized as Japanese citizens, Zainichi Koreans previously had to go through multiple, complex steps, requiring collection of information about their family and ancestors stretching back ten generations. This information could be collected through a Korean organization such as Mindan, but with their prohibitively expensive cost, many were unable to afford it. However, these processes have become much easier, and today, it is easier for Zainichi Koreans to naturalize into Japanese citizens.

Though there are a few cases of celebrities who naturalize with their Korean name, the majority of naturalized Zainichi Koreans formally choose a name that is both read and appears ethnically Japanese. This supports the aforementioned cultural implication of naturalisation, leading some to take the rate of naturalisation as a rough measure of assimilation.

During the post-World War II period, many Zainichi Koreans married with other Zainichi Koreans, and it was a rare case for them to intermarry with Japanese citizens. This was because of Japanese xenophobic prejudice against Zainichi Koreans due to stigma stemming from decades of discrimination. Therefore, Japanese citizens, especially their parents, largely refused marriage with Zainichi Koreans. However, there were problems with marriage between Zainichi Koreans, too. As stated in the previous section, Zainichi Koreans were mostly hiding their identity and living as Japanese-presenting people at the time. Because of this, it was very hard for Zainichi Koreans to connect with other people who had the same nationality as them. They were married mostly through arranged marriages supported by Mindan.

Tong-il Ilbo (통일일보), or Tōitsu Nippō (統一日報), a Korean-Japanese newspaper, reported that according to statistics from the Japanese Ministry of Health, Labour and Welfare, there were 8,376 marriages between Japanese and Koreans. Compared to 1,971 marriages in 1965, when the statistics began, the number has roughly quadrupled, and it now constitutes about 1% of the 730,971 total marriages in Japan. The highest annual number of marriages between Japanese men and Korean women was 8,940, in 1990. Since 1991, it has fluctuated around 6,000 per year. On the other hand, there were 2,335 marriages between Korean men and Japanese women in 2006. It has been stable since the number reached 2,000 per year in 1984.

In 1975, Hidenori Sakanaka (坂中 英徳 Sakanaka Hidenori), a bureaucrat in the Ministry of Justice, published a highly controversial document known as the "Sakanaka Paper". He stated that the assertion by both Mindan and Chongryon that Zainichi are destined to eventually return to Korea is no longer realistic. He further predicted that Zainichi would naturally disappear in the 21st century unless they abandon their link between Korean identity and Korean nationality. He argued that the Japanese government should stop treating Zainichi as temporary residents (with a special status) and start providing a proper legal framework for their permanent settlement as "Korean Japanese".

In December 1995, Gendai Korea ("Modern Korea") published the article, "20 years after the Sakanaka Paper" to assess further development. The article pointed out that in the 1980s, 50% of Zainichi Koreans married Japanese, and in the 1990s, the rate was 80%. (In fact, they quoted only 15–18% Korean marriage during 1990 to 1994.) They also pointed out the change in the law in 1985, which granted Japanese citizenship to a child with either parent being Japanese—previous laws granted citizenship only to a child with a Japanese father. In practice, this would mean that less than 20% of Zainichi marriages would result in Zainichi status. According to the article, since naturalisation is concentrated among the younger generation, the Zainichi population should be expected to collapse once the older generation starts to die out in two decades.

The latest figures from Mindan showed that the total population of Zainichi was 598,219 in 2006 and 593,489 in 2007, and that only 8.9% married another Zainichi in 2006. There were 1,792 births and 4,588 deaths, resulting in a 2,796 natural decrease. On top of that, there were 8,531 naturalisations, which resulted in a total decrease of 11,327 in 2006 (2%).

=== Registration of residents ===
After Zainichi Koreans lost Japanese nationality, the Immigration Control Act of 1951 and the Alien Registration Law of 1952 required them to be fingerprinted and to carry a certificate of registration as other foreigners did. The Permanent Residents by Accord of 1965 allowed Zainichi Koreans who had lived in Japan since the colonial period to apply for permanent residency, but their descendants could not. Twenty-six years later, the Japanese Diet passed the Special Law on Immigration Control and categorized Zainichi Koreans who have lived without any gap since the end of World War II or before and their lineal descendants as Special Permanent Residents. The fingerprint requirement for Zainichi Koreans was terminated by 1993.

=== Right to vote and government employment ===
Long-term ethnic Korean residents of Japan who have not taken up Japanese nationality currently have the legal status of Tokubetsu Eijusha ("Special Permanent Residents") and are granted special rights and privileges compared to other foreigners, especially in matters such as re-entry and deportation statutes. These privileges were originally given to residents with South Korean nationality in 1965, and were extended in 1991 to cover those who have retained their Korean nationality.

Over the decades, Zainichi Koreans have been campaigning to regain their Japanese citizenship rights without having to adopt Japanese nationality. The right to claim social welfare benefits was granted in 1954, followed by access to the national health insurance structures (1960s) and state pensions (1980s). There is some doubt over the legality of some of these policies, as the Public Assistance Law, which governs social welfare payments, is seen to apply only to "Japanese nationals".

There has been discussion about Zainichi South Koreans' right to vote in South Korea. Since Special Permanent Residents are exempted from military service and taxes, the South Korean government was reluctant to give them the right to vote, arguing they did not register as residents, though it thought most people agree on granting the right to vote to short-stay South Korean travelers. On the other hand, Zainichi South Koreans claimed that they should be granted it because the Constitution of South Korea guarantees anyone having South Korean nationality the right to vote. In 2007, the Constitutional Court of Korea concluded all South Korean nationals don't have the right to vote in South Korea if they are permanent residents of other countries.

Zainichi North Koreans are allowed to vote and theoretically eligible to stand in North Korea's show elections if they are 17 years old or older.

There have also been campaigns to allow Zainichi Koreans to take up government employment and participate in elections, which are open to Japanese nationals only. Since 1992, Mindan has been campaigning for the right to vote in elections for prefectural and municipal assemblies, mayors, and prefecture governors, backed by the South Korean government. In 1997, Kawasaki became the first municipality to hire a Korean national. So far, three prefectures—Osaka, Nara, and Kanagawa—have supported voting rights for permanent foreign residents.

However, the Japanese Diet has not yet passed a resolution regarding this matter, despite several attempts by a section within the Liberal Democratic Party of Japan to do so, and there is considerable public and political opposition against granting voting rights to those who have not yet adopted Japanese nationality. Instead, the requirements for naturalization have been steadily lowered for Zainichi to the point that only criminal records or affiliation to North Korea would be a hindrance for naturalization. Both Zainichi organisations oppose this, as both see naturalization as de facto assimilation. In November 2011, the South Korean government moved to register Zainichi Koreans as voters in South Korean elections, a move which attracted few registrants. While Mindan-affiliated Zainichi Koreans have pressed for voting rights in Japan, they have very little interest in becoming a voting bloc in South Korean politics. Chongryon for its part opposes moves to allow Zainichi Koreans to participate in Japanese politics, on the grounds that they assimilate Koreans into Japanese society and thus weaken Korean ethnic identity.

=== Korean schools ===
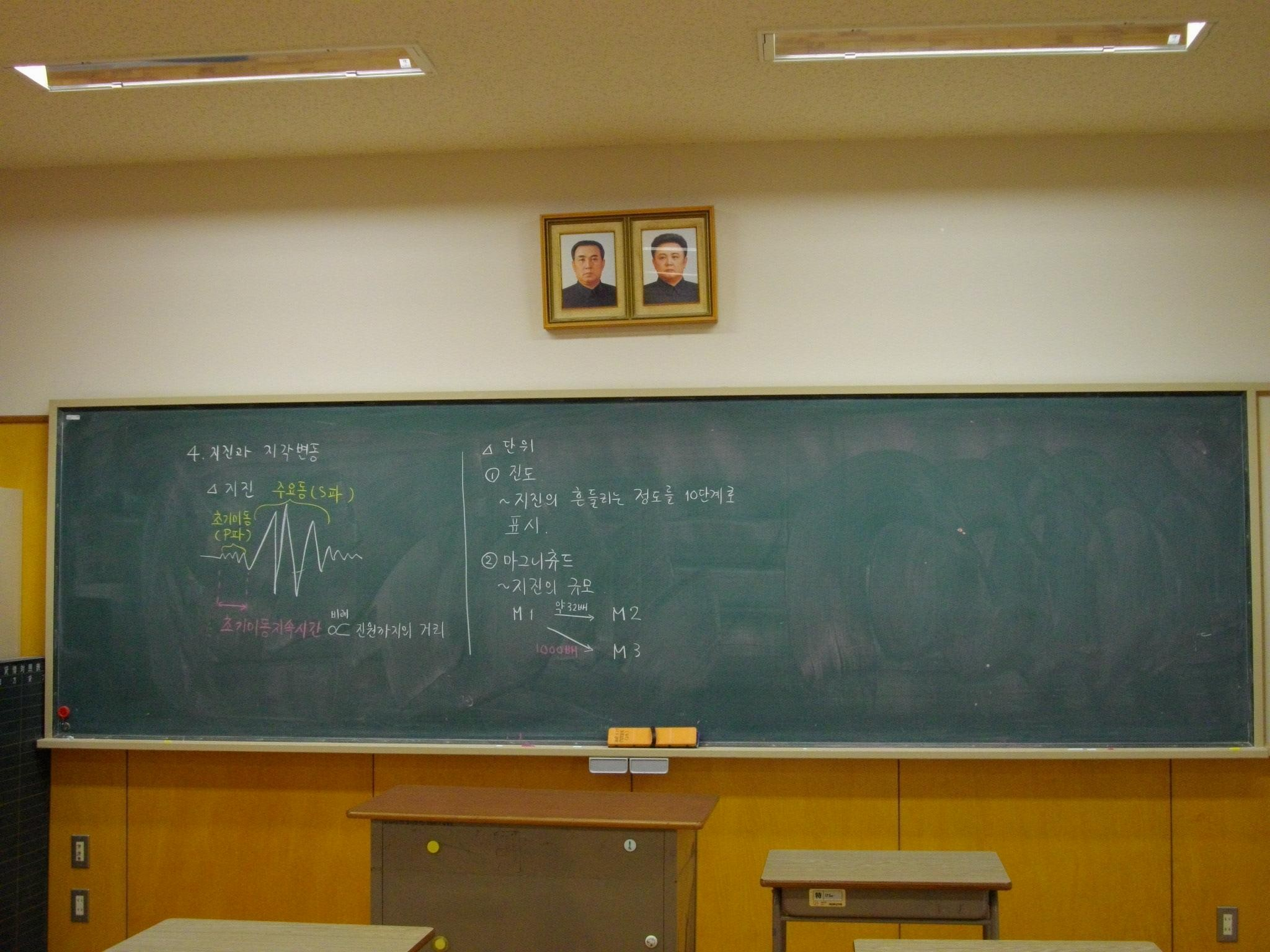
Classroom at Tokyo Korean High School with photographs of Kim Il Sung and Kim Jong Il

The pro-North Korea association Chongryon operates 218 Chōsen gakkō across Japan, including kindergartens and one university, Korea University. All lessons and all conversations within the school are conducted in Korean. They teach a strong pro-North Korean ideology and allegiance to Kim Il Sung, Kim Jong Il, and Kim Jong Un. The textbooks include an idealized depiction of the economic development of North Korea and Songun policy of Kim Jong Il.

One of the issues the schools now face is a lack of funding. The schools were originally set up and run with support from the North Korean government, but this money has now dried up, and with dropping pupil numbers, many schools are facing financial difficulties. The Japanese government has refused Chongryon's requests that it fund ethnic schools in line with regular Japanese schools, citing Article 89 of the Japanese Constitution, where use of public funds for education by non-public bodies is prohibited. In reality, the schools are in fact partly funded by local authorities, but subsidies are given in the form of special benefits paid to the families of pupils, as opposed to paying the schools directly, in order to avoid a blatant breach of Article 89. It is still much less than the amount received by state schools.

Another issue is an examination called the High School Equivalency Test, or daiken, which qualifies those who have not graduated from a regular high school to apply for a place in a state university and take an entrance exam. Until recently, only those who had completed compulsory education (i.e., up to junior high school) were entitled to take the daiken. This meant pupils of ethnic schools had to complete extra coursework before being allowed to take the exam. In 1999, the requirement was amended so that anyone over a certain age is qualified. Campaigners were not satisfied because this still meant graduates of non-Japanese high schools had to take the daiken. In 2003, the Education Ministry removed the requirement to take the Equivalency Test from graduates of Chinese schools, Mindan-run Korean schools, and international schools affiliated with Western nations and accredited by U.S. and British organizations. However, this did not apply to graduates of Chongryon-run Korean schools, as the ministry said it could not approve their curricula. The decision was left up to individual universities, 70% of which allowed all Korean school graduates to apply directly.

Due to the issues described above, the number of students at Korean schools run by Chongryon has declined by 67%, and many of the children of Zainichi Koreans now choose to go to orthodox Japanese schools.

There are a few Kankoku Gakkō (Korean: 한국학교; 韓國學校, Japanese: 韓国学校) located in Tokyo, Osaka, Ibaraki, Kyoto, and Ishioka, which receive sponsorship from South Korea and are operated by Mindan. Koreans who live in Japan and support South Korea are likely to attend a Kankoku gakkō. Alternatively, they may go to a normal school in Japan taught in Japanese. Most Koreans who have lived in Japan since they were born, however, go to normal schools even if there is a Kankoku gakkō near them.

=== Legal alias ===
Legal alias

Japanese name
- Kanji: 通名
- Kana: つうめい
Transcriptions
- Romanization: Tsūmei

North Korean name
- Chosŏn'gŭl: 통명
- Hancha: 通名
Transcriptions
- Revised Romanization: Tongmyeong
- McCune–Reischauer: T'ongmyŏng

Registered aliens in Japan are allowed to adopt a registered alias (通称名, tsūshōmei), often abbreviated to tsūmei (通名; "common name"), as their legal name. Traditionally, Zainichi Koreans have used Japanese-style names in public, but some Zainichi Koreans, including celebrities and professional athletes, use their original Korean names. Well-known ethnic Koreans who use Japanese names include Hanshin Tigers star Tomoaki Kanemoto, pro wrestlers Riki Choshu and Akira Maeda, and controversial judoka and mixed martial artist Yoshihiro Akiyama.

During the Korea-Japan 2002 FIFA World Cup, a Mindan newspaper conducted a survey regarding the use of aliases. 50% of those polled said that they always use an alias, while 13% stated they always use their original name. 33% stated that they use either depending on the situation. In a 1986 survey, over 90% of ethnic Koreans in Japan reported having a Japanese-sounding name in addition to a Korean one. In a 1998 study, 80% stated that they used their Japanese names when in Japanese company, and 30% stated that they used their Japanese names "almost exclusively".

== Zainichi in the Japanese labor market ==
Zainichi Koreans are said to mainly be employed in pachinko parlors, restaurants/bars, and construction. Discrimination against Zainichi Koreans in hiring has pushed many into so-called 3D (dirty, dangerous, and demeaning) industries. Annual sales of pachinko have totaled about 30 trillion yen since 1993, and Zainichi Koreans have accounted for 90% of such sales. However, the pachinko industry is shrinking, because the Japanese government has imposed stricter regulations. The number of pachinko parlors decreased by 9–10% between 2012 and 2016, while the number of people playing pachinko dropped to less than 9.4 million.

Some Zainichi Koreans have developed yakiniku restaurants. The honorary president of the All Japan "Yakiniku" Association is Tae Do Park (alias Taido Arai).

In the 1970s, Korean newcomers started to enter the precious metals industry. Currently, 70% of precious metals products in Japan are made by certified Zainichi Koreans.

Some Zainichi Koreans participate in organized crime, as do people in other segments of the population. A former member of the yakuza group Sumiyoshi-kai estimated there are a few hundred Korean yakuza, and that some of them are bosses of branches. However, the member went on to say that Korean gang members tend to go to China and Southeast Asia, as these countries are more lucrative for them than Japan.

There has been improvement in the working rights of Zainichi Koreans since the 1970s. For example, foreigners including Zainichi Koreans were previously not allowed to become lawyers in Japan, but Kim Kyung Deok became the first Zainichi Korean lawyer in 1979. As of 2018, there are more than 100 Zainichi Korean lawyers in Japan, and some of them have worked as members of LAZAK (Lawyers Association of Zainichi Koreans).

== In popular culture ==
The earliest Japanese films featuring Koreans in Japan often depicted Koreans as members of the peripheral society, rather than as main characters. It wasn't until after the Second World War that films visualized the struggles and oppression experienced by Zainichi Koreans, with films such as Three Resurrected Drunkards (1968) by Nagisa Ōshima, which addressed the bigotry and xenophobia experienced by Zainichi in Japan. The first film to present the Zainichi experience from a Zainichi director was the 1975 film River of the Stranger by Lee Hak-in.

Zainichi director Yoichi Sai's All Under the Moon was the first to receive critical acclaim, earning several best film awards in 1993. In 2001, Zainichi director Lee Sang-il released his first film, Chong, and in 2001, Zainichi author Kazuki Kaneshiro's Naoki Prize-winning book GO (2000), about a North Korean Zainichi, was made into a popular film of the same name. Yang Yong-hi would be the first to address the Chongryon experience in a documentary, with Dear Pyongyang in 2005.

Korean American creatives have used the Zainichi experience to parse their own experience as part of the greater Korean diaspora, with films such as Benson Lee's 2016 film Seoul Searching, and author Min Jin Lee's 2017 novel Pachinko. Pachinko tells the story of several generations of Zainichi Koreans and the prevailing stereotype within Japan about Koreans and pachinko parlors; the book explores themes of belonging, nationality, and longstanding political debates about discrimination and xenophobia against Koreans in Japan. The novel has been made into a limited TV series of the same name by Apple TV+.

== Notable people ==
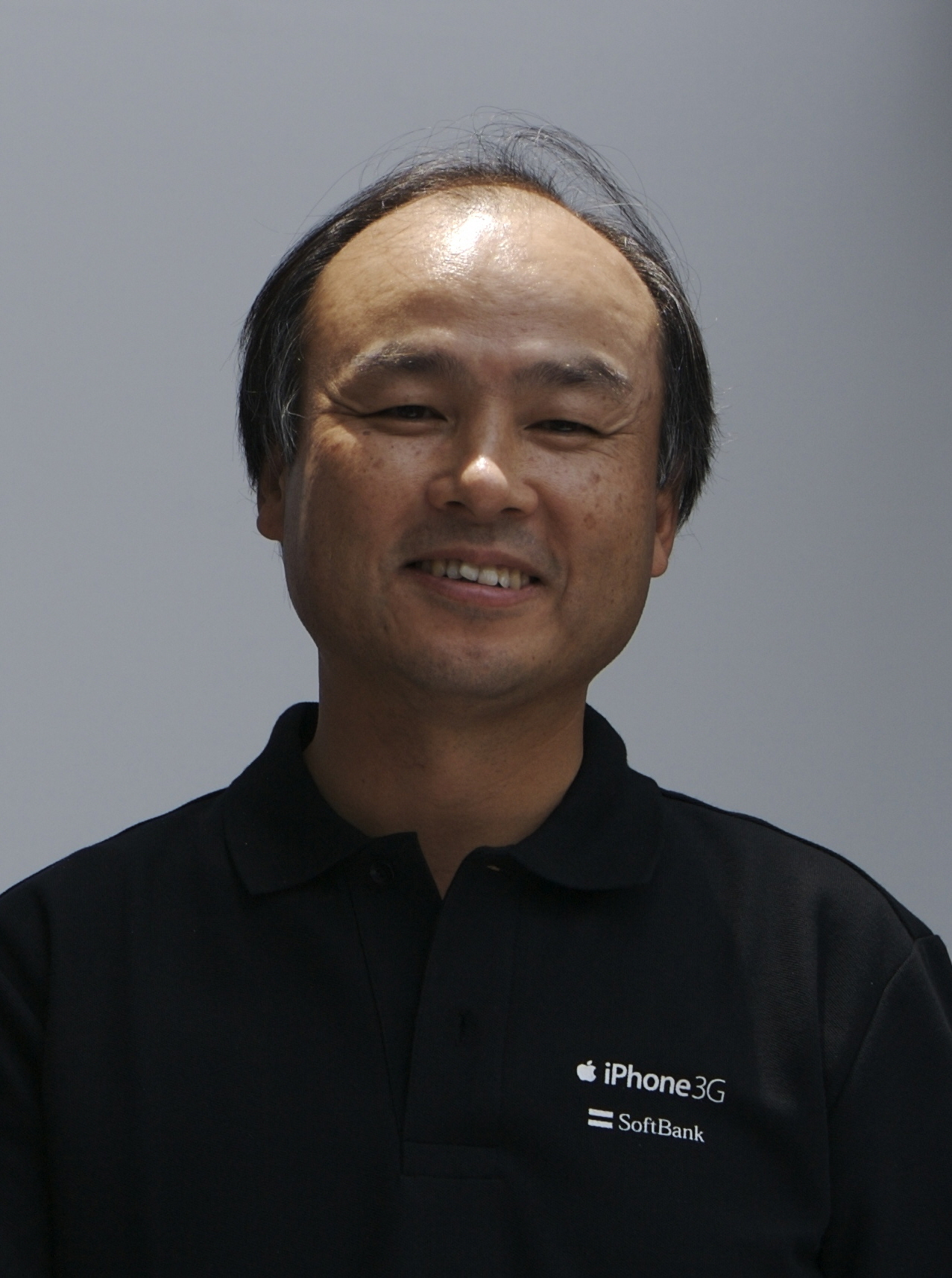
Masayoshi Son

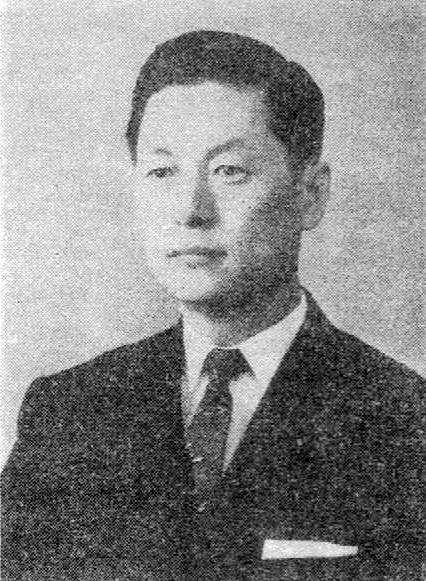
Shin Kyuk-ho

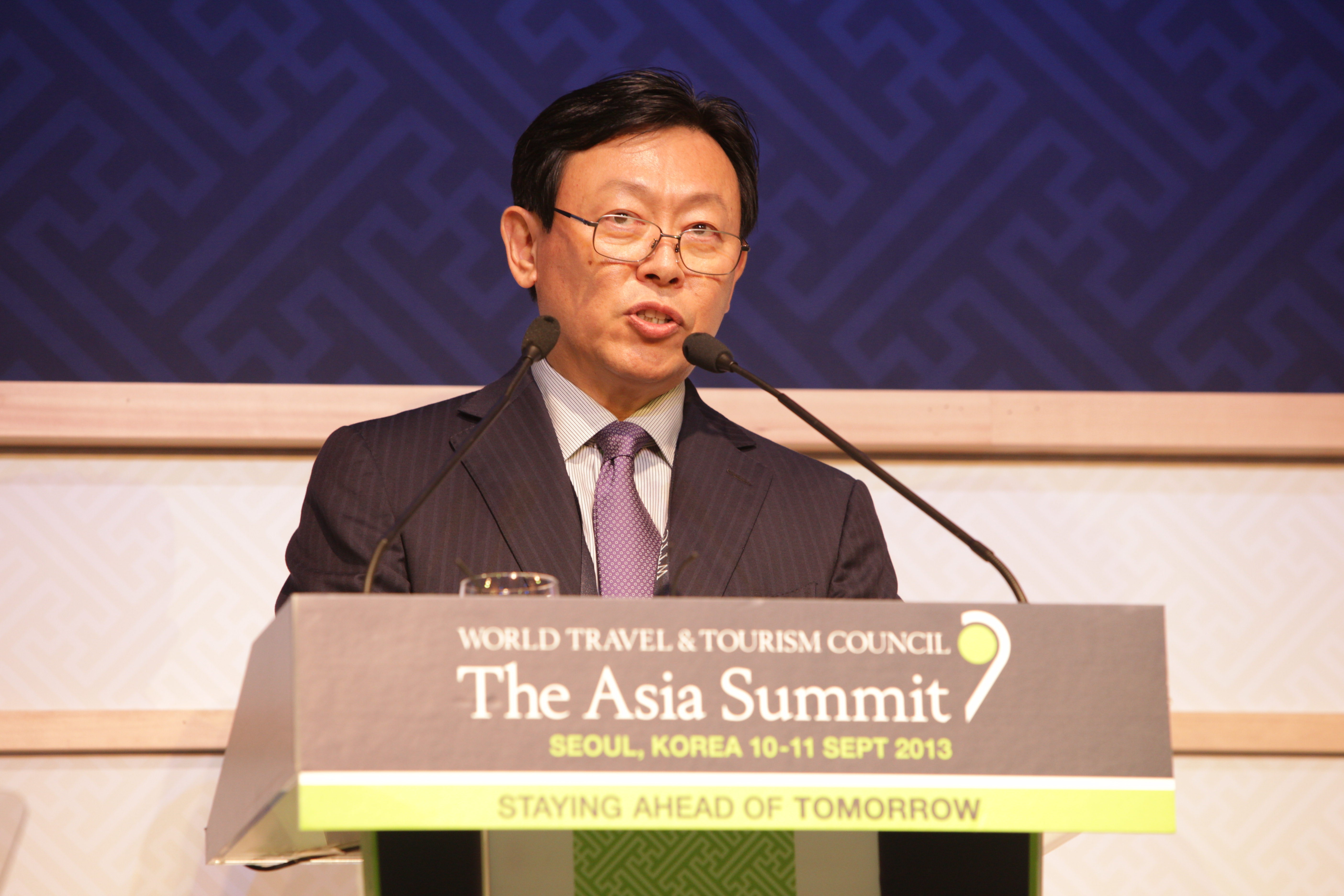
Shin Dong-bin

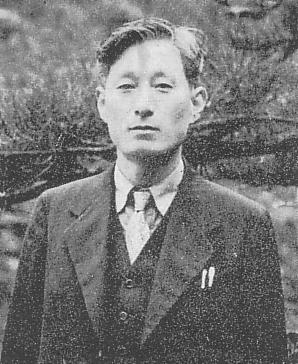
Kim Chon-hae

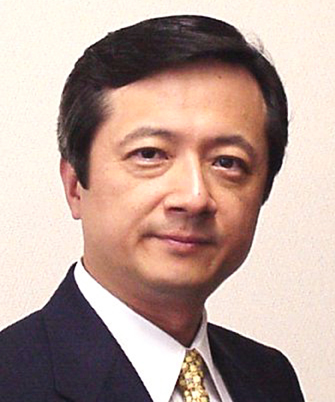
Shinkun Haku

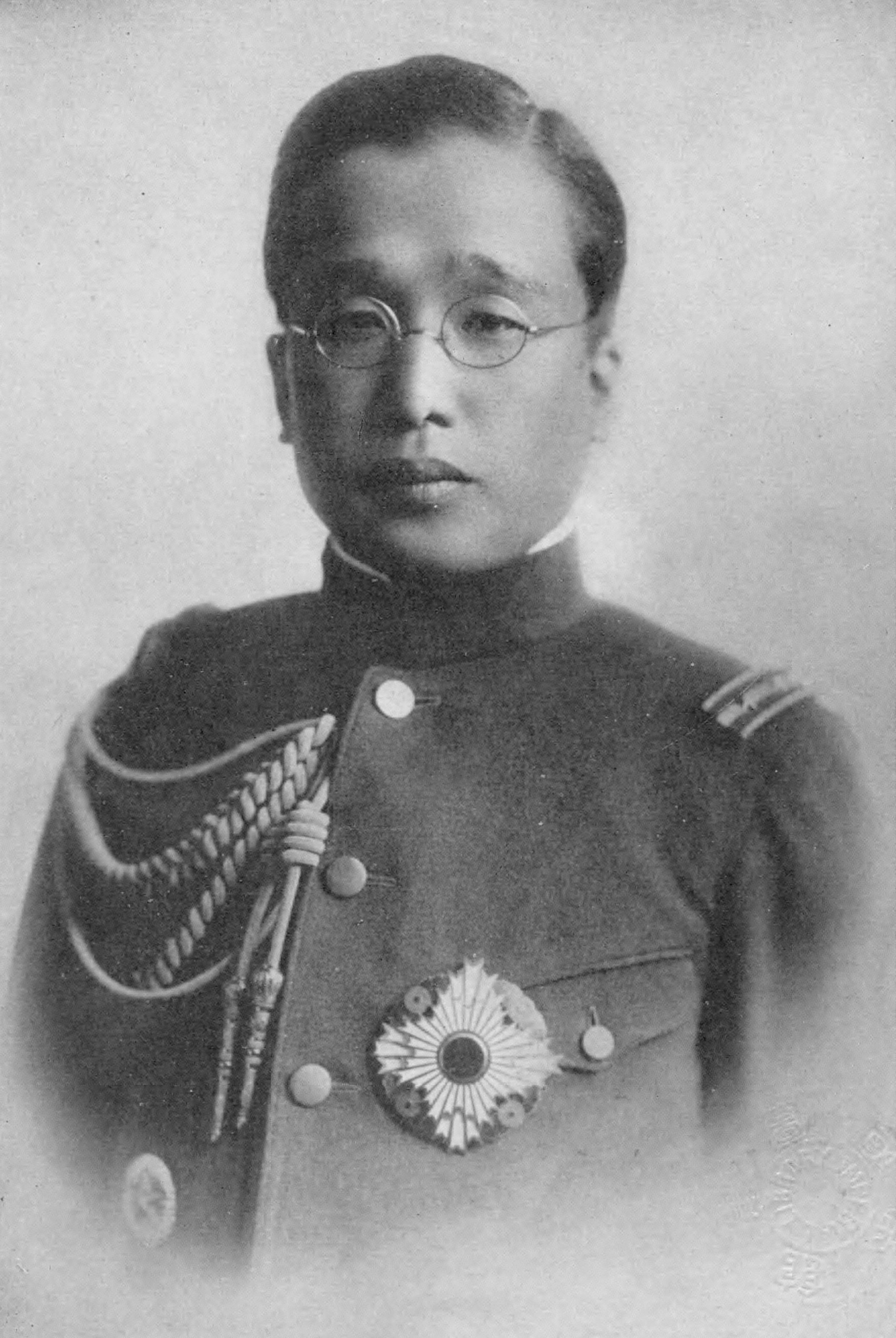
Yi Un

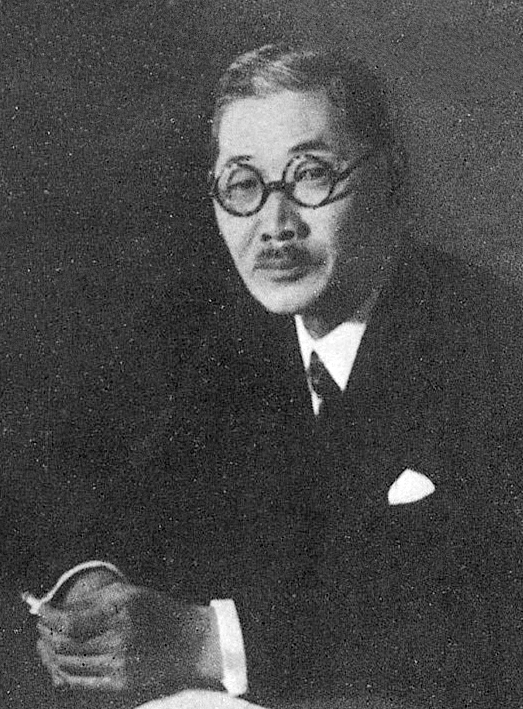
Shigenori Tōgō

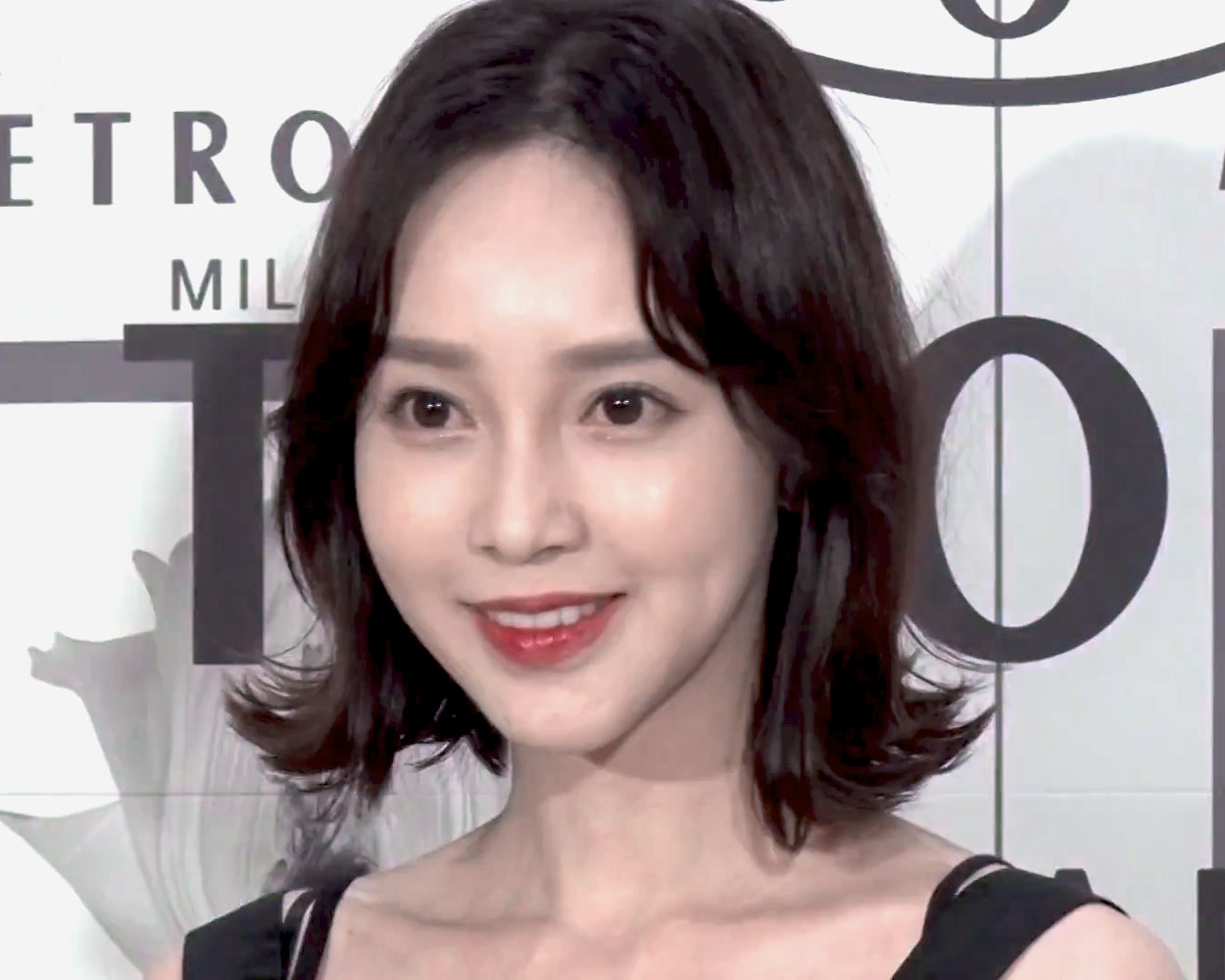
Lee Ahyumi

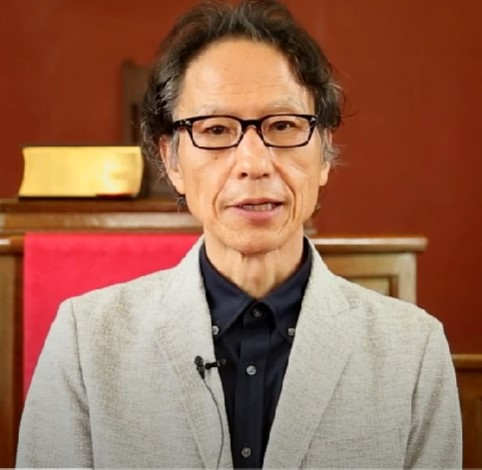
Kang Sang-jung

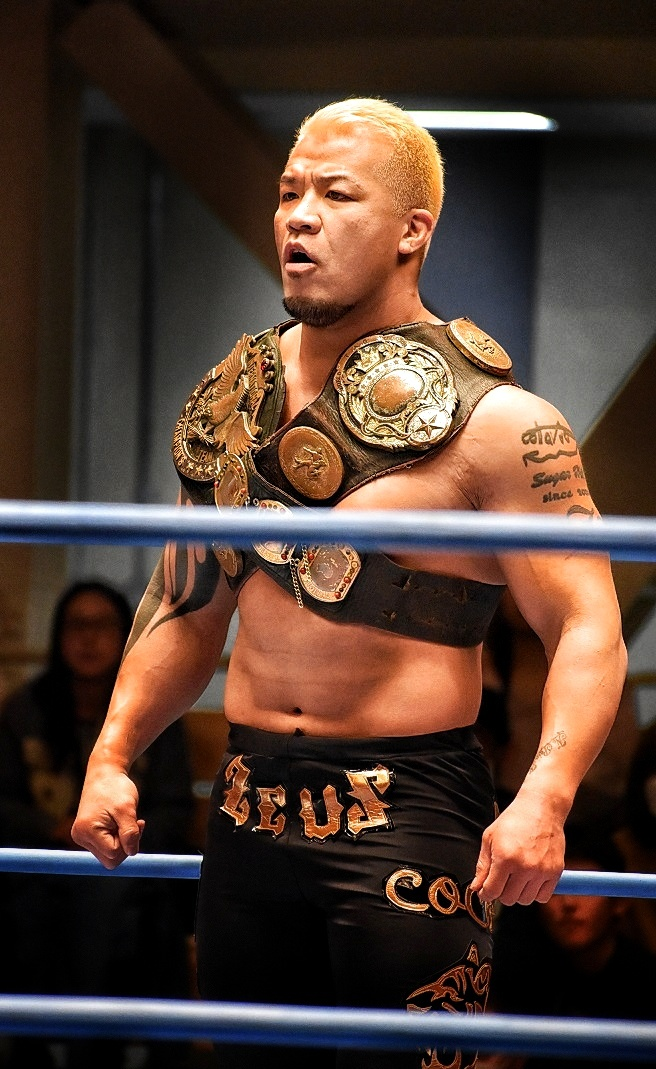
Zeus

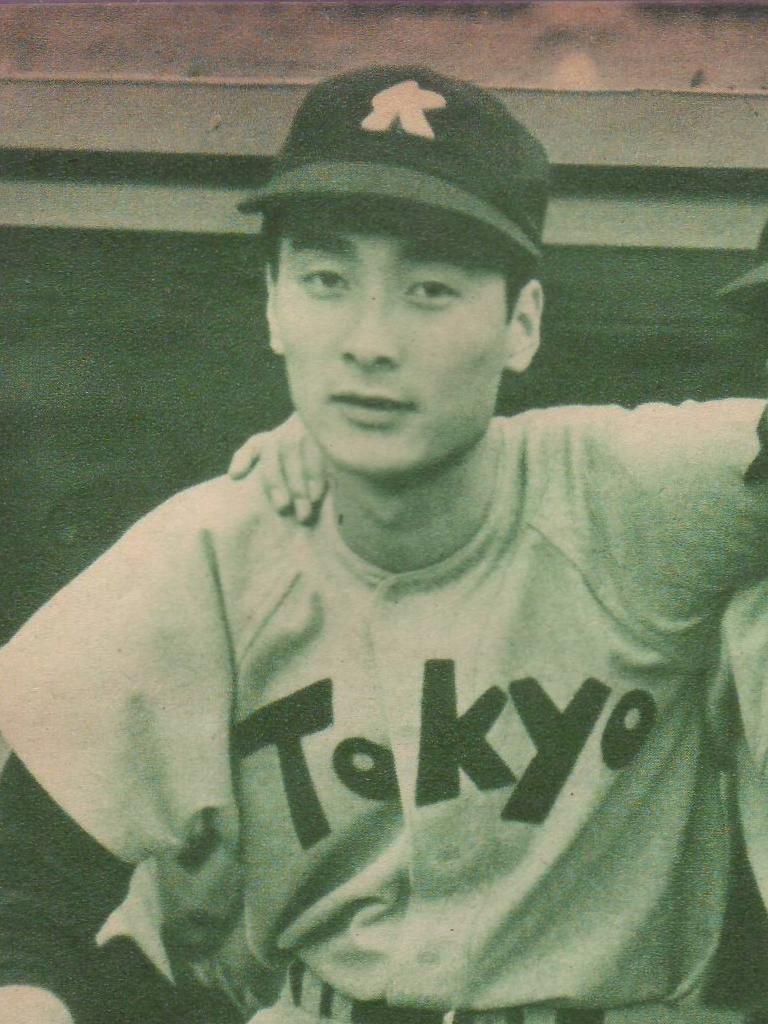
Masaichi Kaneda

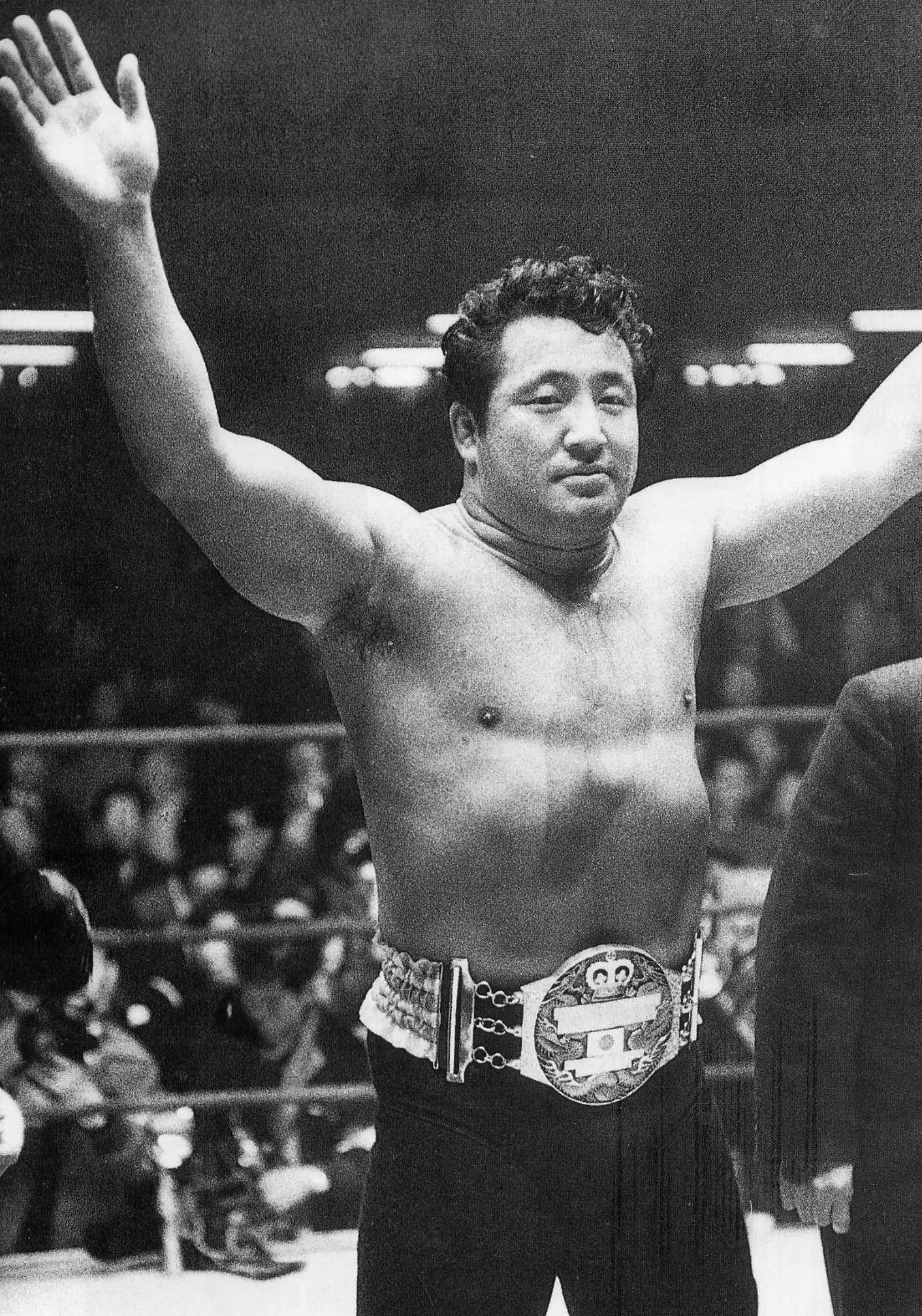
Rikidōzan

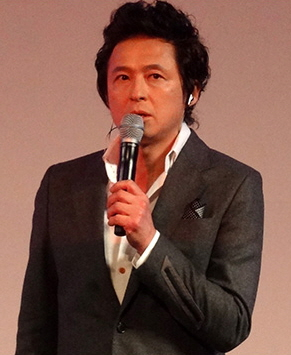
Yang Bang-ean

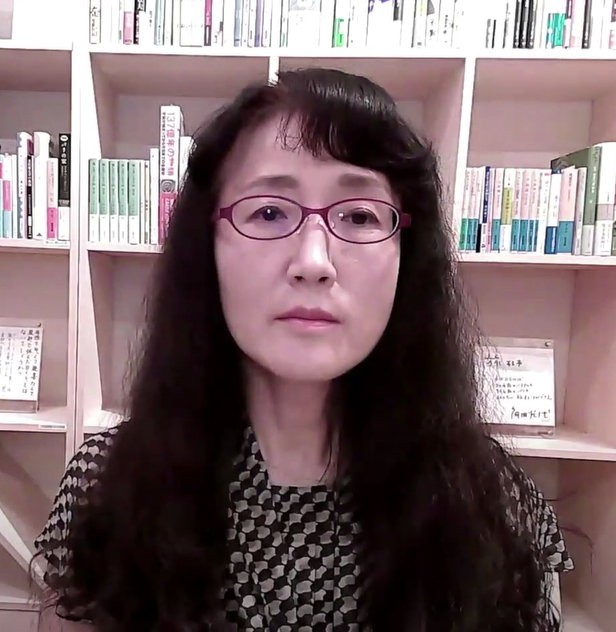
Miri Yu

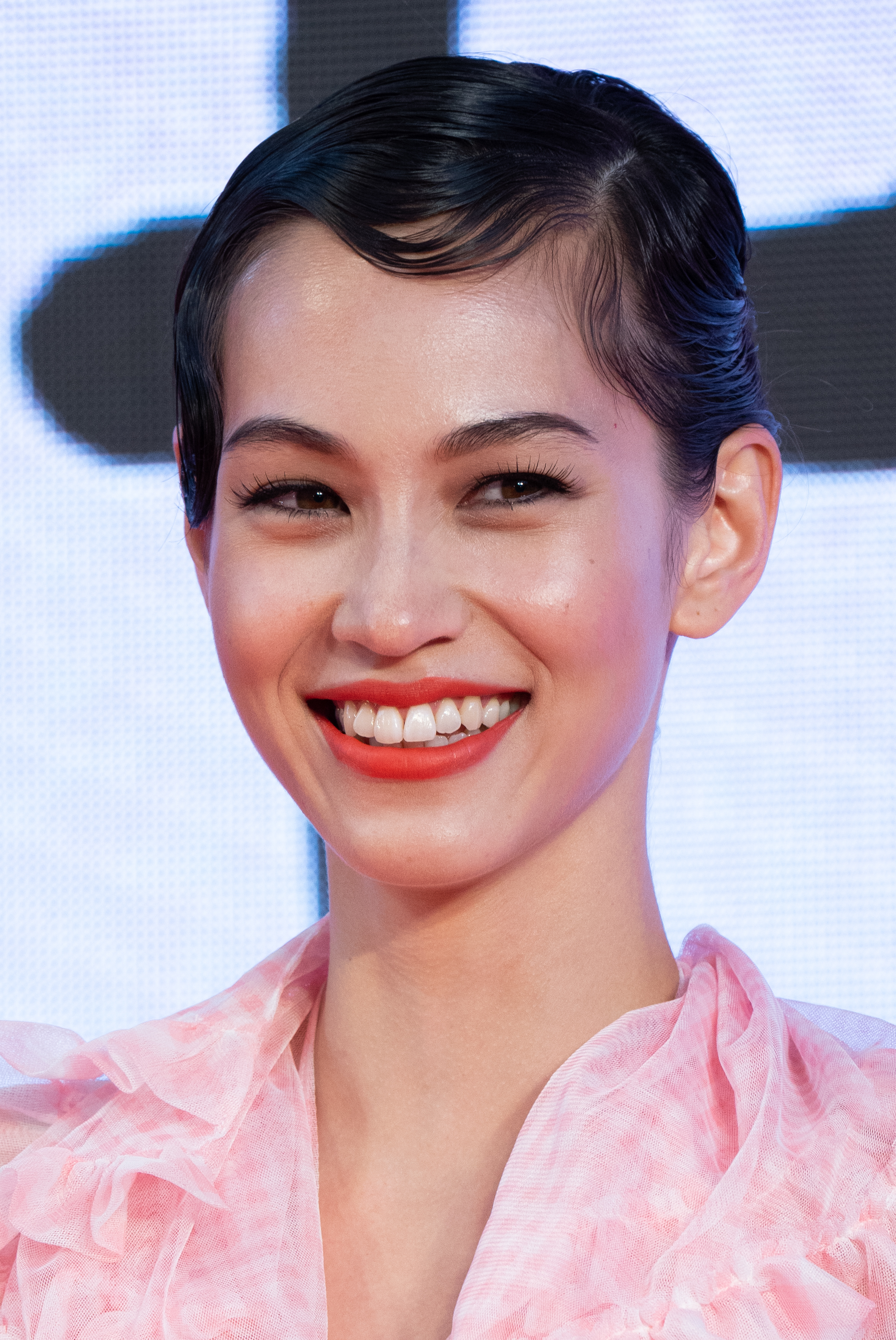
Kiko Mizuhara

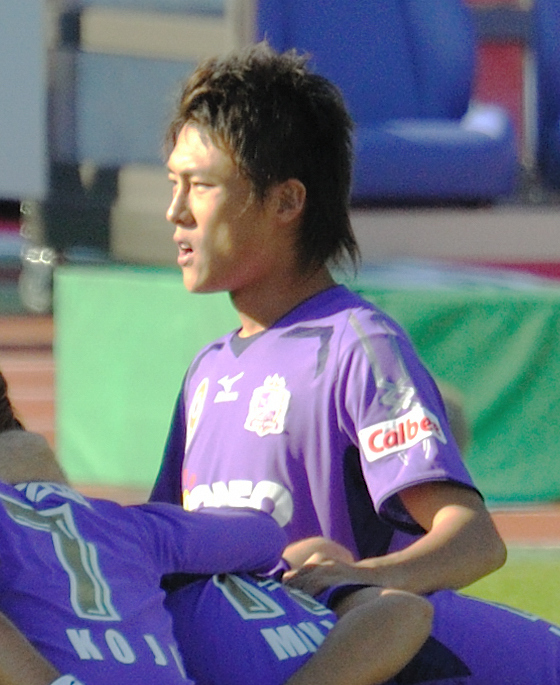
Tadanari Lee

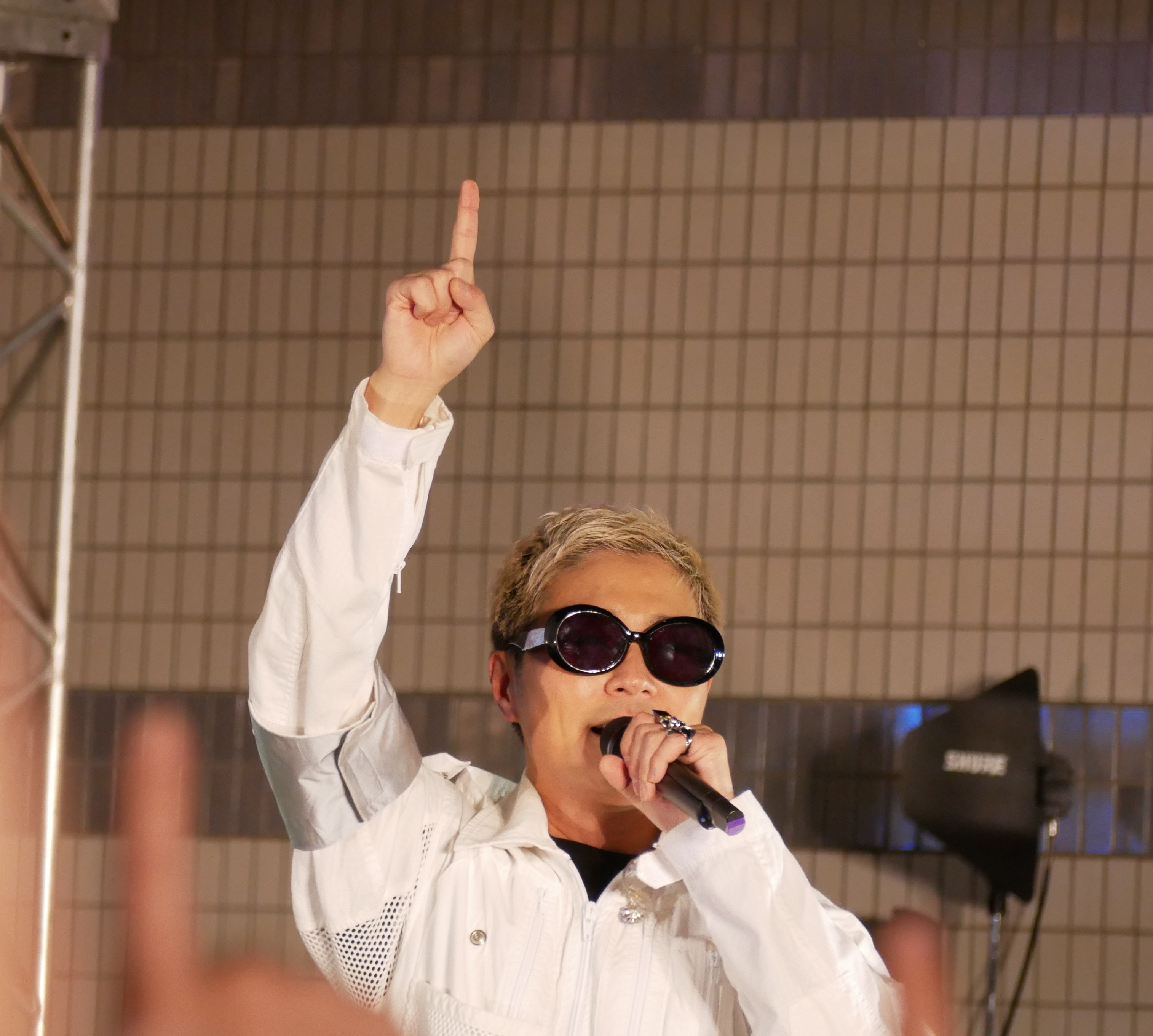
Verbal

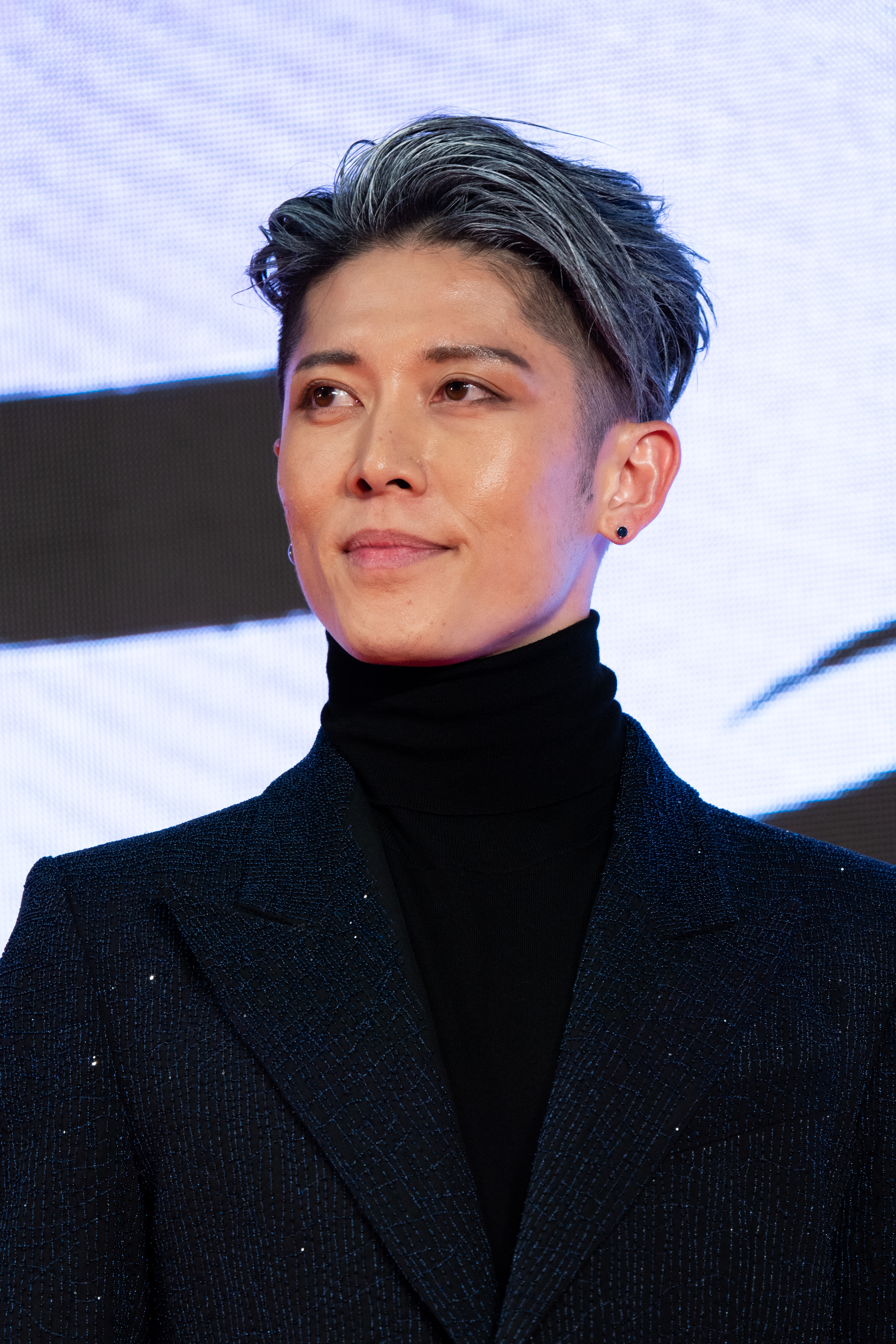
Miyavi

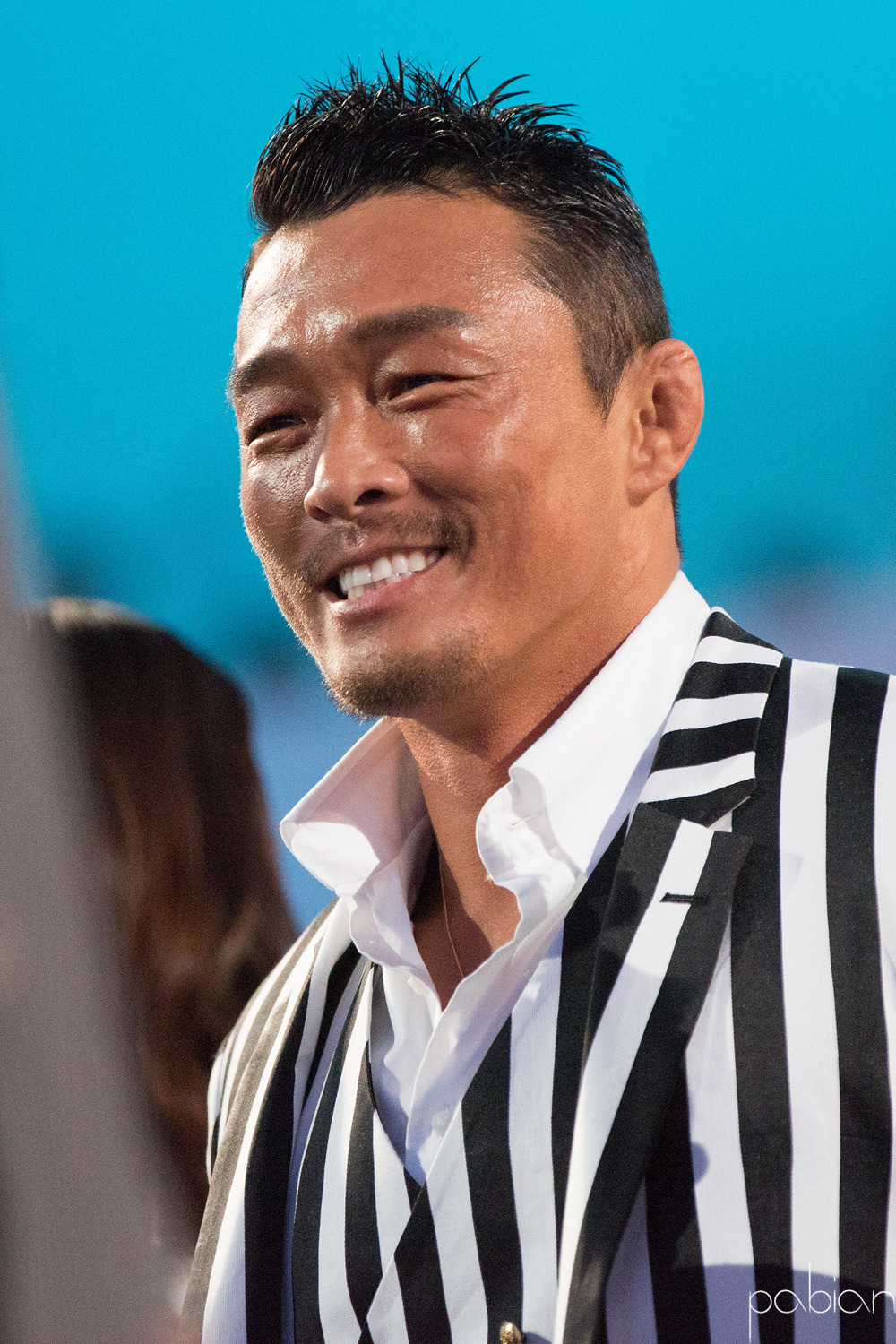
Yoshihiro Akiyama

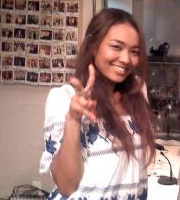
Crystal Kay

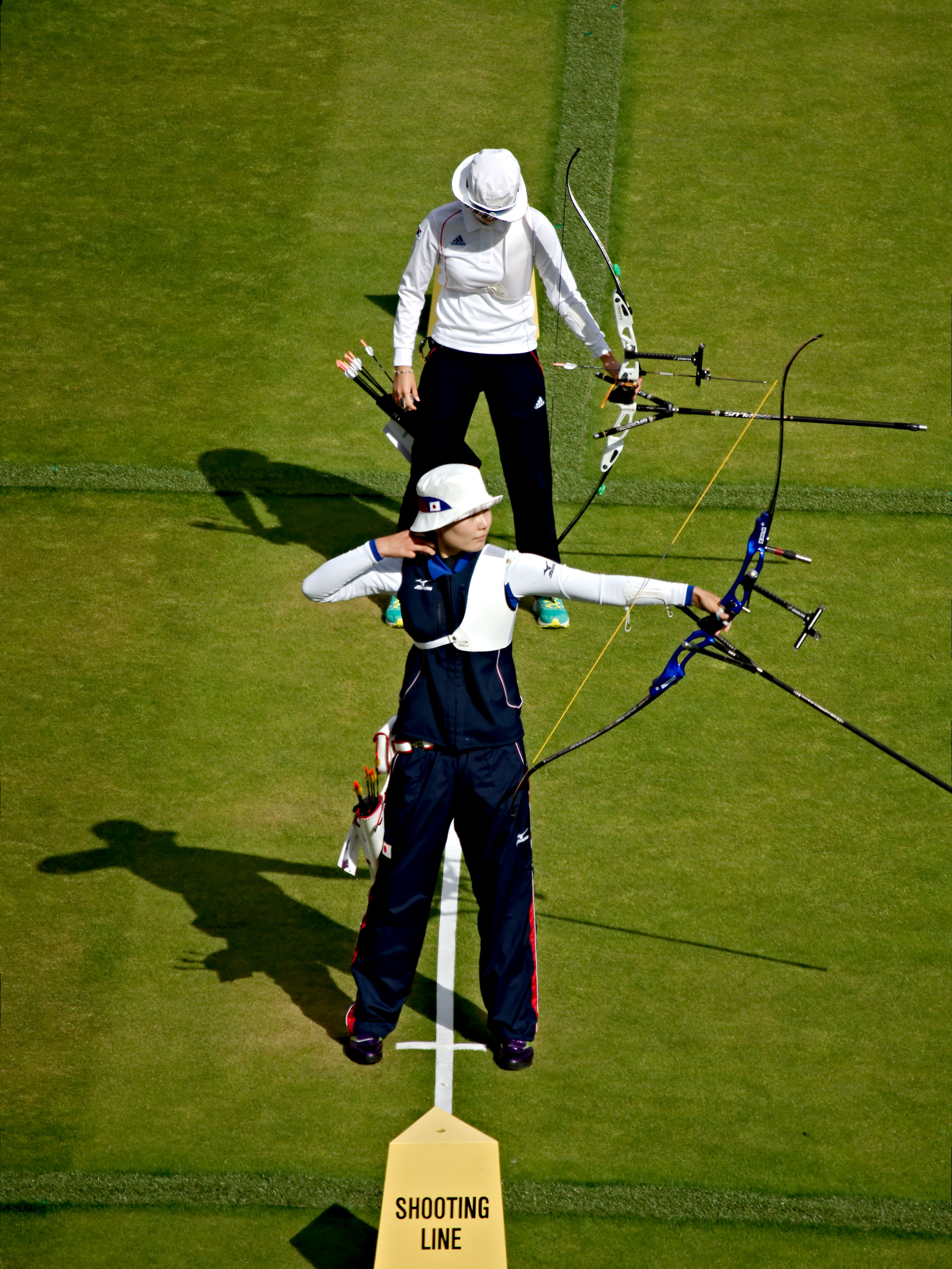
Ren Hayakawa

== See also ==
- The History Museum of J-Koreans
- Koreatowns in Japan
  - Utoro, Uji
- Sōshi-kaimei
- Kantō Massacre
- Shinano River incident
- Demography of Japan
- Ethnic issues in Japan
- Japan–Korea disputes
- Japan–North Korea relations
- Japan–South Korea relations
- Japanese people in South Korea
- List of Koreans in Japan
- History of Japan–Korea relations
- Anti-Korean sentiment in Japan
- Racism in Japan
- Hanshin Education Incident
- Koma Shrine
- Koryo-saram
- Koreans in China
  - Korean Chinese in Japan

=== Other ethnic groups in Japan ===
- Ainu people
- Chinese people in Japan
- Ryukyuan people
- Yamato people
- Bonin Islanders
- Matagi
