= Gwisil clan =

Ancient Korean clan

Gwisil clan 鬼室
- Parent house: Buyeo clan (扶餘氏)
- Titles: Various
- Founder: Gwisil Jeongin (鬼室貞仁)
- Founding year: 7th century

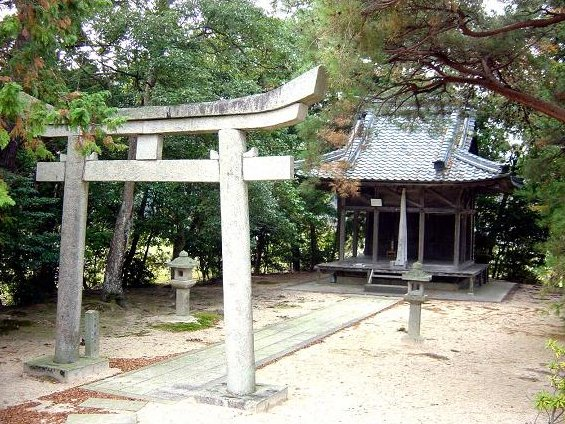
Kishitsu Shrine in Hino, Shiga Prefecture, Japan which enshrines Gwisil Jipsa.

The Gwisil clan (Kwi-sil; 鬼室氏, Japanese: Kishitsu) were a collateral branch of the royal family of the Korean kingdom of Baekje, one of the Three Kingdoms of Korea who settled in Japan. They descended from the third son of the 26th king, Seong of Baekje, whose name is unknown. The characters "鬼" and "室" literally mean "demon" and "house".

== History ==
In 660, Baekje was attacked by the allied armies of Silla and the Tang dynasty of China who had made the Silla–Tang alliance. The capital, Sabi, was taken, but Boksin resisted near modern-day Yesan. After Uija of Baekje surrendered to Tang, Boksin and the monk Dochim kindled a restoration movement known as the Baekje Revival Movement. They sent for the prince Buyeo Pung, who had been living as a hostage in Yamato Japan, an important Baekje ally. With some Japanese aid, they gathered the remnants of the Baekje army and launched a series of attacks on the Silla-Tang forces.

In 663, Silla and Tang counterattacked and besieged the restoration movement at a fortress known as Juryu Castle (Juryu-seong, 주류성/周留城) now in Seocheon County, South Chungcheong. At this point Boksin appears to have betrayed the restoration movement. He had Dochim killed and sought to slay Prince Pung as well. However, Pung killed him first, and fled to Goguryeo. The restoration movement was destroyed shortly thereafter at the Battle of Baekgang.

== Ancestry ==
- Munju of Baekje (文周王, ?–477) - 22nd King of Baekje.
        - Gwisil Jeongin (鬼室貞仁, ?–?) - father of Boksin, seems to be first to take the name "Gwisil".
          - Gwisil Boksin (鬼室福信, ?–663) - son of Jeongin, general of Baekje who is known for the revival movement. In Japan he was called "Kishitsu Fukushin" by the Japanese reading of his characters.
            - Gwisil Jipsin (鬼室集信, ?–?) - son of Boksin, older brother of Jipsa, settled in Japan after the fall of Baekje. In Japan he was called "Kishitsu Shushin" by the Japanese reading of his characters.
            - Gwisil Jipsa (鬼室集斯, ?–688) - settled in Japan after the fall of Baekje and was appointed Head of Education. In Japan he was called "Kishitsu Shushi" by the Japanese reading of his characters.
          - Gwisil Bokeung (鬼室福応 / 鬼室福應), brother of Boksin, ancestor of the Oka clan (岡氏) and the (浄岡氏) clan.

== See also ==
- History of Korea
- Three Kingdoms of Korea
- List of Monarchs of Korea
- Seong of Baekje
