= Gwisil Jipsa =

- Hangul: 귀실집사
- Hanja: 鬼室集斯
- RR: Gwisil Jipsa
- MR: Kwisil Chipsa

Gwisil Jipsa (鬼室集斯, ? – 688), was the son of Gwisil Boksin, a general of Baekje, one of the Three Kingdoms of Korea. The Gwisil clan was a collateral branch of the royal family, the Buyeo clan (扶餘氏). He settled in Japan after the fall of the kingdom and death of his father where he became a member of the Japanese court where they called him Kishitsu Shushi after the Japanese reading of his name.

== Fall of Baekje ==
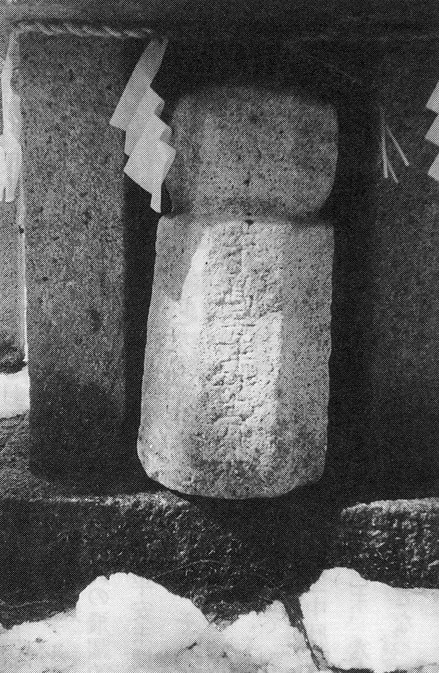
Octagonal tombstone of Jipsa.

Before Jipsa moved to Japan he was a Dalsol (達率, 2nd court rank) in Baekje's 16 rank system. When Paekche fell in 660 his father tried to save the nation by raising an army and proclaiming Buyeo Pung, the son of the last recognized king of Baekje, King Uija, as the next king under the name King Pungjang (豊璋王). In 663, the Silla–Tang alliance counterattacked, and besieged the restoration movement at the fortress of Juryu Castle (주류성/周留城). Boksin was captured and then executed; his head was salted and pickled.

== Japan ==
Three years after the death of his father, the Baekje army was destroyed at the Battle of Baekgang and Gwisil Jipsa came and settled in Japan with his family during the second year of Emperor Tenji's reign (663). In February, 665, Naka no Ōe no Miko (Emperor Tenji) granted the rank of "Lower Shokin" (小錦下) upon Jipsa and he became Chief of the Department of Education. He settled in Gamō-gun, Omi Province.

Nihon Shoki:

- "[in A.D. 663]. . . . The Minister Yeo Jasin, the Minister Gwisil Jipsa, and others, men and women, to the number of over 700 persons, were removed and settled in the district of Kamafu in the province of Afumi [in A.D. 669]." Nihongi (NII: 295) further records that the rank of Upper Daikin was conferred on the Baekje Minister Yeo Jasin and on Sataek Somyeong (second official of the Department of Ceremonies that was in charge of personnel administration); the rank of Lower on Gwisil Jipsa (Chief of the Department of Education); and the rank of Lower Daisen on the Dalsol Gongna Jinsu (who had military training ), . . . on Kim-su (acquainted with medicine ), . . . on Heo Sol-mo (who thoroughly understood the five classics), and on Kak Pyeongmu (skilled in the Yin and Yang). The rank Lower was conferred on the other Dalsol, more than fifty persons in all [in AD 671].”

== Kishitsu Shrine ==
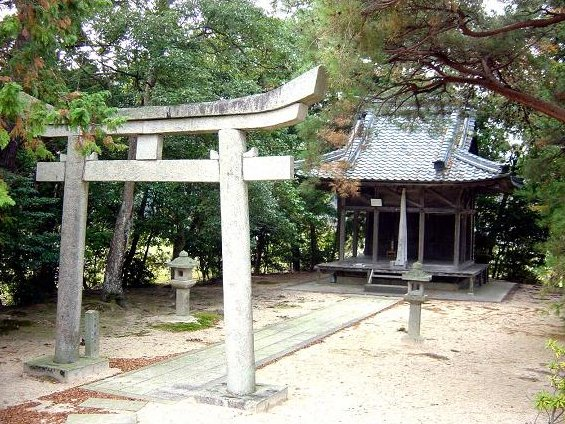
Kishitsu Shrine with tomb of Gwisil Jipsa.

Gwisil Jipsa died on November 8 or December 5 of 688. His tomb is located at Kishitsu Shrine (Kishitsu-jinja, 鬼室神社) in Ono, Hino-chō, Gamō-gun, Shiga-ken, Japan.

His father, Boksin, is enshrined in the village of Eunsan-ri, Buyeo County, South Chungcheong Province, South Korea. Because of this Hino and Eunsan decided to become sister cities in 1990.

== Legacy ==
Jipsa became ancestor of several Japanese clans including the Kikuchi clan, a powerful family of Higo Province, Kyushu. He also brought a lot of knowledge from the continent that helped the Japanese greatly. Jipsa had an older brother named Gwisil Jipsin (鬼室集信, Kishitsu Shushin) who is mentioned only once in the Japanese Nihon Shoki.

== See also ==
- History of Korea
- Three Kingdoms of Korea
