= List of Paekche people =

This is a list of known people who lived in Paekche 18 BCE – 660 CE.

== Rulers ==
For a chronological list of rulers, see List of Korean monarchs.

#	Name by which commonly known	Hangul	Hanja	Period of reign	Personal name	Relationship	Note
1	Onjo	온조왕	溫祚王	18 BCE – 29 CE		founder	son of Dongmyeong of Goguryeo or Wutae
2	Daru	다루왕	多婁王	29–77		first son of Onjo
3	Giru	기루왕	己婁王	77–128		first son of Daru
4	Gaeru	개루왕	蓋婁王	128–166		son of Giru
5	Chogo	초고왕	肖古王	166–214		son of Gaeru	also Sogo (소고왕, 素古王)
6	Gusu	구수왕	仇首王	214–234		first son of Chogo	also Guisu (귀수왕, 貴須王)
7	Saban	사반왕	沙泮王	234		first son of Gusu	also Sai (사이왕, 沙伊王)
8	Goi	고이왕	古爾王	234–286		second son of Gaeru	also Gui (구이군, 久爾君)
9	Chaekgye	책계왕	責稽王	286–298		son of Goi	also Cheonggye (청계왕, 靑稽王)
10	Bunseo	분서왕	汾西王	298–304		first son of Chaekgye
11	Biryu	비류왕	比流王	304–344		second son of Gusu
12	Gye	계왕	契王	344–346	Buyeo Joon	first son of Bunseo
13	Geunchogo	근초고왕	近肖古王	346–375	Buyeo Gu	second son of Biryu	also Chogo (초고왕, 肖古王) or Sokgo (속고왕, 速古王)
14	Geun-gusu	근구수왕	近仇首王	375–384		son of Geunchogo	also Guisu (귀수왕, 貴首王)
15	Chimnyu	침류왕	枕流王	384–385		first son of Geungusu
16	Jinsa	진사왕	辰斯王	385–392		younger brother of Chimnyu	also Buyeohui (부여휘, 扶餘暉)
17	Asin	아신왕	阿莘王	392–405		cousin of Jinsa; first son of Chimnyu	also Aha (아화왕, 阿華王)
18	Jeonji	전지왕	腆支王	405–420		first son of Asin	also Jikji (직지왕, 直支王) or Jinji (진지왕, 眞支王)
19	Gu-isin	구이신왕	久爾辛王	420–427		first son of Jeonji
20	Biyu	비유왕	毗有王	427–454		first son of Guisin	also Yeobi (여비, 餘毗)
21	Gaero	개로왕	蓋鹵王	454–475	Gyeongsa (경사, 慶司) or Gyeong (경, 慶)	first son of Biyu	also Yeogyeong (여경, 餘慶)
22	Munju	문주왕	文周王	475–477	Modo (모도, 牟都) or Do (도, 都)	son of Gaero
23	Samgeun	삼근왕	三斤王	477–479	Samgeun (삼근, 三斤), Imgeol (임걸, 壬乞) or Samgeol (삼걸, 三乞)	first son of Munju	also Mun-geun (문근왕, 文斤王)
24	Dongseong	동성왕	東城王	479–501	Modae (모대, 牟大) or Mamo (마모, 摩牟)	cousin of Samgeum
25	Muryeong	무령왕	武寧王	501–523	Sama (사마, 斯麻 or 斯摩) or Yung (융, 隆)	second son of Dongseong	also Sama (사마왕, 斯麻王), Do (도왕, 嶋王), or Horyeong (호령왕, 虎寧王)
26	Seong	성왕	聖王	523–554	Buyeo Myeong (명, 明)	son of Muryeong	also Myeong (명왕, 明王) or Seongmyeong (성명왕, 聖明王)
27	Wideok	위덕왕	威德王	554–598	Chang (창, 昌)	first son of Seong	also Chang (창왕, 昌王)
28	Hye	혜왕	惠王	598–599	Gye (계, 季)	younger brother of Wideok	also Heon (헌왕, 獻王)
29	Beop	법왕	法王	599–600	Seon (선, 宣) or Hyosun (효순, 孝順)	first son of Hye
30	Mu	무왕	武王	600–641	personal name Jang (장, 璋) or Seodong (서동, 薯童)	youngest son of Wideok	also Mugang (무강왕, 武康王) or Mugwang (무광왕,武廣王)
31	Uija	의자왕	義慈王	641–660		first son of Mu

== Military leaders/Political leaders ==
- Wutae (우태, 優台, ?–?), father of the founders of Baekje, Onjo and Biryu.
- Dongmyeong of Goguryeo (동명성왕, 東明聖王, 58–19BCE), step-father of the founders of Baekje, Onjo and Biryu. In separate legends he is their father or at least the father of Onjo.
- So Seo-no (소서노, 召西奴, 77–6 BCE), mother of the founders of Baekje, Onjo and Biryu.
- Buyeo clan (扶餘氏) – royal family of Baekje.
  - Biryu (비류, 沸流, ?–?), older brother of the first king, Onjo.
  - Tokusa-Ō (덕좌왕, 德佐王, ?–?), son of King Onjo of Baekje who settled in Japan.
  - Buyeo Usu (부여우수, 扶餘優壽, ?–?) – son of the 3rd king, Gaeru of Baekje. The only record of him is in the Samguk Sagi in 260 when he was appointed Minister of the Interior (內臣佐平, Naesin-jwa'pyeong).
  - Buyeo Ubok (부여우복, 扶餘優福, ?–?), member of the royal family who led a rebellion in 327.
  - Buyeo Gonji (부여곤지, 扶餘昆支, ?–477), younger brother of King Munju of Baekje and father of Dongseong of Baekje who for a period lived in Japan.
  - Shigakishi (순타태자, 斯我君, ?–?), known in Baekje as Buyeo Sa'a. He was sent to Japan in 505 as a political hostage to Emperor Buretsu of Japan.
  - Prince Junda (순타태자, 純陁太子, ?–513), son of King Muryeong of Baekje who settled in Japan. Ancestor of the Yamato clan.
  - Mokuto-Ō (목도왕, 目圖王/目図王, ? – ?), grandson of King Seong of Baekje, ancestor of the Gwisil clan and Oka no muraji clan (岡連氏). He settled in Japan.
  - Prince Imseong (임성태자, 琳聖太子, 577–657), son of King Wideok of Baekje who settled in Japan. Ancestor of the Ōuchi clan.
  - Buyeo Hunhae (부여훈해, 扶餘訓解, ?–405), 2nd son of Chimnyu of Baekje who was assassinated by his brother Buyeo Seolye.
  - Buyeo Seolye, (부여설례, 扶餘碟禮, ?–405), 3rd son of Chimnyu of Baekje who assassinated his brother Buyeo Hunhae in attempt to take the crown for himself.
  - Buyeo Hong, (부여홍, 扶餘洪, ?–407), 3rd son of Chimnyu of Baekje who assassinated his brother Buyeo Hunhae in attempt to take the crown for himself.
  - Buyeo Sin (부여신, 扶餘信, ?–429), second son of Asin of Baekje. He was first appointed in February, 407 as Minister of the Interior (Naesin-jwa’pyeong, 内臣佐平) then elected in 408 as chief minister (Sang-jwa'pyeong, 上佐平) which he held through the reign of three kings.
  - Princess Bogwa (보과공주, 宝果公主), daughter of Dongseong of Baekje and became consort of the 23rd King of Silla, Beopheung of Silla.
  - Lady Sobi (比召, ?–?), daughter of Seong of Baekje and became consort of the 24th King of Silla, Jinheung of Silla.
  - Ajwa-Taeja (아좌태자, 阿佐太子, 572–645), left to Japan in 597 where he was called "Asa-Taishi" and painted a portrait of Prince Shōtoku.
  - Imseong-Taeja (임성태자, 琳聖太子, 577–657), he left to Japan in 611 where he was called "Rinshō-taishi" and became ancestor of the Ōuchi clan (大内氏).
  - Jin'ni-Ō (진이왕, 辰爾王, ?–?), settled in Japan and became ancestor of the Tatara clan, Ōuchi clan and Toyota clan.
  - Buyeo Gyogi (부여교기, 扶餘翹岐, ?–?), banished to Japan in 642by his brother the last king, Uija of Baekje.
  - Buyeo Yung (부여융, 扶餘隆, 615–682), fought in the revival movement.
  - Buyeo Tae (부여태, 扶餘泰, ?–?), second son, exiled to China with father.
  - Buyeo Hyo (부여효, 扶餘孝, ?–?), exiled to China with father.
  - Buyeo Yeon (부여연, 扶餘演, ?–?), exiled to China with father
  - Zenkō (선광, 善光, 621–687), son of King Uija of Baekje who settled in Japan. Ancestor of the Kudara no Konikishi clan. Known in Baekje as "Buyeo Seon'gwang" (부여선광, 扶餘善光).
  - Buyeo Pung (부여풍, 扶餘豊, 623–668), shortly crowned king but unrecognized as King Pungjang (풍장왕, 豊璋王).
  - Buyeo Sa (부여사, 扶餘絲, ?–?), son of Buyeo Pung who escaped to Japan but was assassinated by Silla agents but is the ancestor of several Japanese clans. He was called Teika-Ō (禎嘉王) in Japan.
  - Buyeo Yong (부여용, 扶餘勇, ?–?), led the Baekje revolutionary army along with his brother Pung but was defeated and exiled.
  - Buyeo Chung'seung (부여충승, 扶餘忠勝, ?–?), took part in the revival movement, fate unknown.
  - Buyeo Chungji (부여충지, 扶餘忠志, ?–?), took part in the revival movement, fate unknown.
  - Buyeo Seong'chung (부여성충, 扶餘成忠, 605–656), political who tried frequently advised the king in vain to change his ways. Angered at his advice the king put him in prison. He refused to eat and later died there.
- Gwisil clan (鬼室氏) – collateral branch of the royal family.
  - Mokuto-Ō (目圖王/目図王, ?–?), grandson of King Seong, the Korean reading of his name is "Mokdo-wang". He is ancestor of the Oka no muraji clan (岡連氏) and Gwisil clan. Father of Oku no muraji no Anki.
  - Oka no muraji no Anki (岡連安貴, ?–?), known in Baekje as "Angwi". Father of Gwisil Jeongin
  - Gwisil Jeongin (鬼室貞仁, ?–?), father of Boksin, seems to be first to take the name "Gwisil".
  - Gwisil Boksin (귀실복신, 鬼室福信, ?–663), famous as the general who led the Baekje Revival Movement but was killed by Buyeo Pung after he changed sides.
  - Gwisil Jipsa (귀실집사, 鬼室集斯, ?–688), son of Gwisil Boksin who settled in Japan. He was a Dalsol (達率, 2nd court rank) who was granted the rank of Lower Shokin (小錦下) by Emperor Tenji and became Head of the Department of Education in the Japanese court.
  - Gwisil Jipsin (귀실집신, 鬼室集信, ?–?), son of Gwisil Boksin who settled in Japan.
- Heukchi clan (黑齒氏) – collateral branch of the royal family.
  - Heukchi Mundae (흑치문대, 黑齒文大, ?–?), head of the Heukchi clan, in the Heuk-chi area.
  - Heukchi Deokhyeon (흑치덕현, 黑齒德顯, ?–?), head of the Heukchi clan, in the Heuk-chi area.
  - Heukchi Sacha (흑치사차, 黑齒沙次, ?–?), head of the Heukchi clan, in the Heuk-chi area.
  - Heukchi Sangji (흑치상지, 黑齒常之, 630–689), general who became a leader of the Baekje Revival Movement, and later a Tang dynasty general.
- Jin clan (眞氏) – one of the "Great Eight Families" of Baekje.
  - Jin Hwe (진회, 眞會, ?–?) of "North-bu" (northern district) was appointed Marshal Bulwark of the Right in 38AD. He is the first recorded person from the clan.
  - Jin Gwa (眞果, ?–?) of "North-bu" (northern district) is ordered in 214 to attack a Mal-gal castle. He led 1,000 soldiers to attack and take the Mohe castle of Seokmun.
  - Jin Chung (진충, 眞忠, ?–?), appointed "Jwa'jang" (Commanding General) and entrusted with military affairs.
  - Jin Mul (진물, 眞勿, ?–?), appointed in 247 as "Jwa'jang" (Commanding General) and entrusted with military affairs.
  - Jin Ga (진가, 眞可, ?–?), appointed in 261 as Finance Minister (Minister of the Treasury).
  - Jin Yi (眞義, ?–?), appointed in 331 as Prime Minister and Minister of the Interior.
  - Jin Jeong (진정, 眞淨, ?–?), appointed in 347 as Minister of Justice and is recorded as a "relative of the Queen".
  - Jin Godo (진고도, 眞高道, ?–?), general and father of the queen of King Geungusu of Baekje.
  - Lady Ai (阿尒夫人), daughter of Jin Godo who was a General for his father. Queen of Geungusu of Baekje.
  - Jin Gamo (진가모, 眞嘉謨, ?–?), ordered in 390 to attack Goguryeo and captured To-kon-seong and 200 prisoners. He was appointed Jwa'pyeong in charge of military affairs.
  - Jin Mu (진무, 眞武, ?–407), appointed "Jwa'jang" (Commanding General) and entrusted with military affairs. He was the King's maternal uncle. Attacked Goguryeo in 393 and 395, died 407.
  - Lady Palsu (八須夫人, ?–?), is from the Jin clan. Queen of Jeonji of Baekje.
  - Jin Nam (진남, 眞男, ?–?), general who was sent in 478 with 2,000 men to capture Daedu Castle from the rebels Yeon Sin and Hae Gu but he failed.
  - Jin Ro (진로, 眞老, ?–?), general who was sent in 478 after Jin Nam's failure with 500 men and defeated the rebels. Yeon Sin fled to Goguryeo and the Jin clan gained strength.
- Hae clan (解氏) – one of the "Great Eight Families" of Baekje.
  - Hae Ru (해루, 解婁, 55BC–34AD), one of the ten founding members of Baekje, held the title of Ubo (右輔, Marshal Bulwark of the Right). When he died the king, Daru of Baekje mourned greatly for him.
  - Hae Gu (해구, 解仇, ?–?), (Not same as the later Hae Gu). He was appointed in 312 as Minister of Military Affairs (Byeong'gwan-jwa'pyeong, 兵官佐平).
  - Hae Chung (해충, 解忠, ?–?), helped Jeonji of Baekje become king and was appointed Dalsol (達率, 2nd court rank).
  - Hae Su (해수, 解須), appointed 407 as Naebeop-jwa’pyeong (內法佐平, Minister of Rituals).
  - Hae Gu (해구, 解仇, ?–478), (Not same as the earlier Hae Gu). He was Minister of Military Affairs (Byeong'gwan-jwa'pyeong, 兵官佐平) who led a rebellion.
  - Hae Myeong (해명, 解明, ?–501), Hansol (扞率, 5th court rank) who led a rebellion.
- Mok clan (木氏) – one of the "Great Eight Families" of Baekje.
  - Mok Nageunja (목라근자, 木羅斤資, ?–?), general for the Kings Geunchogo and Geungusu who was in charge of the area of the Gaya confederacy.
  - Mok Manchi (목만치, 木滿致, 403–475), son of Mok Nageunja. Ilbonseogi (日本書紀) documents show that the Mok-Manchi (木滿致), Gigak-skune (紀角宿禰), and Giseangban-skune (紀生磐宿禰) worked between the Korean Peninsula and Japanese archipelago in the 5th century.
  - Mok Hyeopmaesun (목협매순, 木劦昧淳, ?–?), politician who worked with the Gaya confederacy.
  - Mok Hyeopman'na (목협마나, 木劦麻那, ?–?), politician who worked with the Gaya confederacy.
  - Mok Hyeopgeumdon (목협금돈, 木劦今敦, ?–?), politician who worked with the Gaya confederacy.
  - Mok Hyeopmuncha (목협문차, 木劦文次, ?–?), politician who worked with the Gaya confederacy.
- Yeon clan (燕氏) – one of the "Great Eight Families" of Baekje.
  - Yeon Sin (연신, 燕信, ?–478), rebelled against Samgeun of Baekje.
  - Yeon Dol (연돌, 燕突, ?–?), appointed Dalsol (達率: 2nd official rank) in 490 and then in 497 appointed Minister of Defense (Byeong'gwan-jwa'pyeong, 兵官佐平) when the previous Minister of Defense, Jin Ro, died.
  - Yeon Mo (연모, 燕謨, ?–?), was a general who was sent in 529 to defend Baekje when the King of Goguryeo, Anjang of Goguryeo attacked from the North. There is a theory that the man called "灼莫古" who was sent to Japan in 516 is the same person as Yeon Mo.
  - Yeon Hoe (연회, 燕會, ?–?), was a general who in 540 surrounded Usanseong Fortress (牛山城) of Goguryeo but King Anwon of Goguryeo attacked and set them to flight.
- Guk clan (國氏) – one of the "Great Eight Families" of Baekje.
  - Guk Jimo (국지모, 國智牟, ?–?), in February, 616, he was sent as a diplomat to the Sui dynasty of China to coordinate a time for a military expedition to Goguryeo. Then Xi Lu, an official from the Department of State Affairs in Sui was sent to Baekje by Emperor Yang of Sui to discuss cooperative relations.
- Baek clan (苩氏) – one of the "Great Eight Families" of Baekje.
  - Baek Ga (백가, 苩加, ?–501), (Not same as the later Baek Ga). He was appointed 486 as Minister of the Royal Guards (Wisa-jwa’pyeong, 衛士佐平). In 501 he was ordered to defend the Buyeo-Garim Fortress but grew resentful and began a rebellion and had the king assassinated while he was hunting. When the king's son, Muryeong of Baekje returned from Japan he defeated Baek Ga and had him killed and his body thrown into the river.
  - Baek Ga (백가, 白加, ?–?), (Not same as the earlier Baek Ga). It seems that he was one of the best craftsmen of Baekje and was dispatched to Japan in 588 to build the first Buddhist temple of Japan. It was completed in 596. His work had a great influence on later Japanese artwork.
  - Baek Maesun (백매순, 白昧淳, ?–?), was a Jangdeok (將德: 7th official rank). He was an architect and in 588 helped build a pagoda for King Wideok.
  - Baek Gi (백기, 苩奇, ?–?), appointed Dalsol (達率: 2nd official rank). In 602, King Mu attacked and took Amak Mountain Fortress (阿莫山城) of Silla and he was ordered to attack four other fortresses. In 616 he was given 8,000 soldiers and attacked Silla.
- Sa clan (沙氏) – one of the "Great Eight Families" of Baekje.
  - Sa Du (사두, 沙豆, ?–?), served as a general for King Asin against Goguryeo.
  - Sataek Giru (사택기루, 沙宅己婁, ?–?), is recorded in 543 as the Chief Minister (Sang-jwa'pyeong, 上佐平) when King Seong held a war meeting to decide how to take back the land of the Gaya confederacy.
  - Lady Sataek (사택왕후, 沙宅王后, ?–642), Queen of King Mu and daughter of the Minister Sataek Jeokdeok (사택적덕, 沙宅積德).
  - Sataek Jeokdeok (사택적덕, 沙宅積德), Minister for King Mu, father of Lady Sataek, queen of King Mu.
  - Sa Geol (사걸, 沙乞, ?–?), was a general who in 627 was ordered to attack two fortresses of Silla. He destroyed them and took over 300 men and woman as prisoners.
  - Sataek Sangyeo (사타상여, 沙咤相如, ?–?), was a general who after the fall of Baekje in 660 joined the revival movement and won back 200 castles but after surrendered when he was defeated by the Silla-Tang alliance.
- Hyeop clan (劦氏) – one of the "Great Eight Families" of Baekje.
- Hoehoe (茴會, ?–?), in 213 he caught a white deer and presented it to the King, Chogo of Baekje. The King deemed it a felicitous omen and gave him 100 stones of grain.
- Sagi (斯紀, ?–?), had mistakenly injured the hoof of the king's steed, feared punishment and fled to Goguryeo. He returned to Baekje and told the king Geungusu of Baekje about Goguryeo's military strength, leading to Geungusu attacking them successfully.
- Domi (都彌, ?–?), his wife was wanted by king Gaeru of Baekje but because she was faithful to her husband, Domi's eyes were plucked out and they ran away to Goguryeo.
- Jaejunggeollu, former Baekje general who he had been exiled and defected to Goguryeo. Jaejunggeollu gave his former king first a deep bow, and then spat in his face three times. Gaero was taken as prisoner of war.
- Seo-dong (서동, 薯童, ?–?), a poor man who taught songs to children from Silla and made problems for King Mu of Baekje.
- Heung Su (흥수, 興首, ?–?), Prime Minister of the last king of Baekje, Uija of Baekje, who advised the king how to save the kingdom but was exiled. Portrayed by Kim Yu-seok in the 2011 KBS1 TV series Gyebaek.
- Gyebaek (계백, 階伯 ?–660), general who defended Baekje during its fall with 5,000 men. Portrayed by Lee Seo-jin and Lee Hyun-woo in the 2011 MBC TV series Gyebaek.

== Buddhist monks ==
- Marananta (마라난타, 摩羅難陀), Buddhist monk from Gandhara in modern-day Pakistan, that brought Buddhism to the southern Korean peninsula in the 4th century CE.
- Gyeomik (겸익, 謙益), monk from Baekje who was sent to India to bring back information on Buddhism.
- Dochim (도침, 道琛, ?–661), leader of the Baekje restoration movement with Gwisil Boksin who had him killed.
- Hozo, immigrant to China who was knowledgeable about this tradition–its influence having reached the Korean kingdom–as well as conversant with practices from Tao honjing's region that were outside the written transmission.
- Hyechong (혜총, 慧灌, ?–?), travelled to Japan in the Asuka period to transmit Buddhism.
- Gwalleuk (관륵, 觀勒, ?–?), travelled to Japan in the Asuka period to transmit Taoism and Buddhism.
- P'ungguk, invited to Japan to teach the Dharma by the younger brother of the Emperor, Prince Anahobe.
- Ven, built Sudeok Temple (Sudeoksa) in 599.
- Sungje, built Sudeok Temple (Sudeoksa) in 599.
- Jimyeong, built Sudeok Temple (Sudeoksa) in 599.
- Hye-Gu, built Naeso Temple (Naesosa) in 633.
- Wonchuk (613–696 AD), lived in China many years to learn Confucian thought before returning to Baekje.
- Ajiki (아직기, 阿直岐, ?–?)- known in Japan as Achiki. he was sent to Japan by King Geunchogo of Baekje to teach them Confucian classics and horse rearing. He recommended Wang In to come to Japan. He became ancestor of the Achiki no Fubito clan (阿直岐史氏) of scribes.
- Wang In (왕인, 王仁, ?–?), semi-legendary scholar who is said to have been sent to Japan by Baekje of southwestern Korea during the reign of Emperor Ōjin. He used to be associated with the introduction of the Chinese writing system to Japan.

== See also ==
- Great Eight Families
- List of Silla people
- List of Goguryeo people
- List of Goryeo people
- List of Joseon people
- List of monarchs of Korea
- Baekje
- Baekje Government
