= Mok clan =

Baekje Korean noble clan

Mok clan 木
- Parent house: unknown
- Titles: Various
- Founder: unknown
- Founding year: unknown

The Mok clan (木氏) was a powerful noble clan of Baekje, one of the Three Kingdoms of Korea.

== Origins ==
The origins of the Mok clan are shrouded in the mists of time. Even though they were one of the most powerful families of Baekje only the name of a few of their members have survived in records. They seem to have a connection to the Gaya confederacy because the members of the clan became powerful after the King of Baekje invaded the Gaya confederacy. Afterwards they were deeply involved with the small confederacies of Gaya and exchange of goods and ideas between the two nations. In the Japanese Shinsen Shōjiroku, the Hayashi clan (林氏) and possibly even the powerful Soga clan are said to have descended from the Mok clan.

== Baekje ==
The Mok were one of the "Great Eight Families" of Baekje. This helped them gain high court positions in the government and military.

After the Battle at Mt. Amak fortress (阿莫山城) against Silla during the beginning of the reign of King Mu of Baekje, the Great Eight Families lost a great deal of power. Among the eight families the Hae clan (who had led the battle), Hyeop (劦氏), Jin and Mok disappeared from the central political stage leaving only the Yeon, Guk and Baek clans. The Sa clan promoted their influence by military force and produced a queen in the late reign of Mu of Baekje.

They did not lose their status as central nobles during the reign of the last King, Uija of Baekje by colluding with royal authority. The Buyeo clan (the royal family, 扶餘氏) acquired influence with the collapse of the Great Eight Families. After King Uija acceded the throne, royal might was also divided and the lineal descendant of the royal clan with the king as its center was in control of political situation. Among the Great Eight Families, Yeon and Baek clans fell behind and only clans of Sa and Guk maintained their status as central nobles. In the late Baekje all the Great Eight Families except for Sa and Guk clans lost their status as the central nobles and were degraded to local influence at last.

== Known members ==
The records of the Mok clan are sparse and broken making it hard to create a family tree but can be viewed as a timeline.

- 13th King: Geunchogo of Baekje, 14th King: Geungusu of Baekje
  - Mok Nageunja (목라근자, 木羅斤資, ?–?), was a general for the Kings Geunchogo and Geungusu who was in charge of the area of the Gaya confederacy.
- 17th King: Asin of Baekje until 21st King: Gaero of Baekje
  - Mok Manchi (목만치, 木滿致, 403–475), son of Mok Nageunja. Nihon Shoki documents show that Mok Manchi (木滿致), Gigak-skune (紀角宿禰), and Giseangban-skune (紀生磐宿禰) worked between the Korean Peninsula and Japanese archipelago in the 5th century.
  - Mok Hyeopmaesun (목협매순, 木劦昧淳, ?–?),
  - Mok Hyeopman'na (목협마나, 木劦麻那, ?–?),
  - Mok Hyeopgeumdon (목협금돈, 木劦今敦, ?–?),
  - Mok Hyeopmuncha (목협문차, 木劦文次, ?–?)

== See also ==
- Baekje Government
