= Baek clan =

Baekje noble Korean clan

Baek clan 苩
- Parent house: unknown
- Titles: Various
- Founder: unknown
- Founding year: unknown

The Baek clan (苩氏) was a powerful noble clan of Baekje, one of the Three Kingdoms of Korea.

== History ==
They were one of the "Great Eight Families" (Daeseongpaljok, 大姓八族) of Baekje: (Sa (沙氏), Yeon (燕氏), Hyeop (劦氏), Hae (解氏), Jin (眞氏), Guk (國氏), Mok (木氏), and Baek (苩氏)). This helped them gain high court positions in the government and military.

After the Battle at Mt. Amak fortress (阿莫山城) against Silla during the beginning of the reign of King Mu of Baekje the Great Eight Families lost a great deal of power. Among the families the Hae clan (who had led the battle), Hyeop, Jin and Mok disappeared from the central political stage leaving only the Yeon, Guk and Baek clans. The Sa clan promoted their influence by military force and produced a queen in the late reign of Mu of Baekje.

They did not lose their status as central nobles during the reign of the last King, Uija of Baekje by colluding with royal authority. The Buyeo clan (the royal family, 扶餘氏) acquired influence with the collapse of the Great Eight Families. After King Uija acceded the throne, royal might was also divided and the lineal descendant of the royal clan with the king as its center was in control of political situation. Among the Great Eight Families, Yeon and Baek clans fell behind and only clans of Sa and Guk maintained their status as central nobles. In the late Baekje all the Great Eight Families except for Sa and Guk clans lost their status as the central nobles and were degraded to local influence at last.

== Known Members ==
The records of the Baek clan are sparse and broken making it hard to create a family tree but can be viewed as a timeline.

- 24th King: Dongseong of Baekje
  - Baek Ga (백가, 苩加, ?–501), was appointed 486 as Minister of the Royal Guards (Wisa-jwa’pyeong, 衛士佐平). In 501 he was ordered to defend the Buyeo-Garim Fortress but grew resentful and began a rebellion and had the king assassinated while he was hunting. When the king's son, Muryeong of Baekje returned from Japan he defeated Baek Ga and had him killed and his body thrown into the river.
- 27th King: Wideok of Baekje
  - Baek Ga (백가, 白加, ?–?), different from the previous Baek Ga but with the same name. It seems that he was one of the best craftsmen of Baekje and was dispatched to Japan in 588 to build the first Buddhist temple of Japan. It was completed in 596. His work had a great influence on later Japanese artwork.
  - Baek Maesun (백매순, 白昧淳, ?–?), was a Jangdeok (將德: 7th official rank). He was an architect and in 588 helped build a pagoda for King Wideok.
- 30th King: Mu of Baekje
  - Baek Gi (백기, 苩奇, ?–?), appointed Dalsol (達率: 2nd official rank). In 602, King Mu attacked and took Amak Mountain Fortress (阿莫山城) of Silla and he was ordered to attack four other fortresses. In 616 he was given 8,000 soldiers and attacked Silla.

== See also ==
- Great Eight Families
- Jin clan
- Hae clan
- Mok clan
- Yeon clan
- Sa clan
- Baekje
- Baekje Government
