= Guk clan =

Guk clan 國
- Parent house: unknown
- Titles: Various
- Founder: unknown
- Founding year: unknown

The Guk clan (Korean: 국; Hanja: 國氏) was a powerful noble clan of Baekje, one of the Three Kingdoms of Korea.

== History ==
They were one of the "Great Eight Families" (Daeseongpaljok, 大姓八族) of Baekje: (Sa (沙氏), Yeon (燕氏), Hyeop (劦氏), Hae (解氏), Jin (眞氏), Guk (國氏), Mok (木氏), and Baek (苩氏)). This helped them gain high court positions in the government and military.

After the Battle at Mt. Amak fortress (阿莫山城) against Silla during the beginning of the reign of King Mu of Baekje the Great Eight Families lost a great deal of power. Among the families the Hae clan (who had led the battle), Hyeop, Jin and Mok disappeared from the central political stage leaving only the Yeon, Guk and Baek clans. The Sa clan promoted their influence by military force and produced a queen in the late reign of Mu of Baekje.

They did not lose their status as central nobles during the reign of the last King, Uija of Baekje by colluding with royal authority. The Buyeo clan (the royal family, 扶餘氏) acquired influence with the collapse of the Great Eight Families. After King Uija acceded the throne, royal might was also divided and the lineal descendant of the royal clan with the king as its center was in control of political situation. Among the Great Eight Families, Yeon and Baek clans fell behind and only clans of Sa and Guk maintained their status as central nobles. In the late Baekje all the Great Eight Families except for Sa and Guk clans lost their status as the central nobles and were degraded to local influence at last.

== Known members ==
The records of the Guk clan are sparse and broken making it hard to create a family tree but can be viewed as a timeline.

- 30th King: Mu of Baekje
  - Guk Jimo (국지모; 國智牟, ?–?): in February, 616, he was sent as a diplomat to the Sui dynasty of China to coordinate a time for a military expedition to Goguryeo. Then Xi Lu, an official from the Department of State Affairs in Sui was sent to Baekje by Emperor Yang of Sui to discuss cooperative relations.

== See also ==
- Great Eight Families
- Jin clan
- Hae clan
- Mok clan
- Yeon clan
- Sa clan
- Baek clan
- Baekje
- Baekje Government
