= Sa clan =

Baekje Korean noble clan

Sa clan 沙
- Parent house: unknown
- Titles: Various
- Founder: unknown
- Founding year: unknown

The Sa clan (沙氏) was a powerful noble clan of Baekje, one of the Three Kingdoms of Korea.

== History ==
They were one of the "Great Eight Families" (Daeseongpaljok, 大姓八族) of Baekje: (Sa (沙氏), Yeon (燕氏), Hyeop (劦氏), Hae (解氏), Jin (眞氏), Guk (國氏), Mok (木氏), and Baek (苩氏)). This helped them gain high court positions in the government and military.

After the Battle at Mt. Amak fortress (阿莫山城) against Silla, At the beginning of the reign of King Mu of Baekje, the Great Eight Families lost a great deal of power. Among the families the Hae clan (who had led the battle), Hyeop, Jin and Mok disappeared from the central political stage leaving only the Yeon, Guk and Baek clans. The Sa clan promoted their influence by military force and produced a queen in the late reign of Mu of Baekje.

They did not lose their status as central nobles during the reign of the last King, Uija of Baekje by colluding with royal authority. The Buyeo clan (the royal family, 扶餘氏) acquired influence with the collapse of the Great Eight Families. After King Uija acceded the throne, royal might be also divided and the lineal descendant of the royal clan with the king at its center and in control of a political situation. Among the Great Eight Families, Yeon and Baek clans fell behind and only clans of Sa and Guk maintained their status as central nobles. In the late Baekje, all the Great Eight Families except for Sa and Guk clans lost their status as the central nobles and were degraded to local influence at last.

== Known members ==
The records of the Sa clan are sparse and broken, making it hard to create a family tree but can be viewed as a timeline.

- 17th King: Asin of Baekje
  - Sa Du (사두, 沙豆, ?–?), served as a general for King Asin against Goguryeo.
- 26th King: Seong of Baekje
  - Sataek Giru (사택기루, 沙宅己婁, ?–?), is recorded in 543 as the Chief Minister (Sang-jwa'pyeong, 上佐平) when King Seong held a war meeting to decide how to take back the land of the Gaya confederacy.
- 30th King: Mu of Baekje
  - Lady Sataek (사택왕후, 沙宅王后, ?–642), Queen of King Mu and daughter of the Minister Sataek Jeokdeok (사택적덕, 沙宅積德)
  - Sa Geol (사걸, 沙乞, ?–?), was a general who in 627 was ordered to attack two fortresses of Silla. He destroyed them and took over 300 men and woman as prisoners.
- 31st King: Uija of Baekje
  - Sataek Sangyeo (사타상여, 沙咤相如, ?–?), was a general who after the fall of Baekje in 660 joined the revival movement and won back 200 castles but after surrendered when he was defeated by the Silla–Tang alliance.

== See also ==
- Great Eight Families
- Jin clan
- Hae clan
- Mok clan
- Yeon clan
- Guk clan
- Baekje
- Baekje Government
