= Yeon clan =

Clan inside the Kingdom's of Korea

Yeon clan 燕
- Parent house: unknown
- Titles: Various
- Founder: unknown
- Founding year: unknown

The Yeon clan (燕氏) was a powerful noble clan of Baekje, one of the Three Kingdoms of Korea.

== History ==
They were one of the "Great Eight Families" (Daeseongpaljok, 大姓八族) of Baekje: (Sa (沙氏), Yeon (燕氏), Hyeop (劦氏), Hae (解氏), Jin (眞氏), Guk (國氏), Mok (木氏), and Baek (苩氏)). This helped them gain high court positions in the government and military.

After the Battle at Mt. Amak fortress (阿莫山城) against Silla during the beginning of the reign of King Mu of Baekje the Great Eight Families lost a great deal of power. Among the families the Hae clan (who had led the battle), Hyeop, Jin and Mok disappeared from the central political stage leaving only the Yeon, Guk and Baek clans. The Sa clan promoted their influence by military force and produced a queen in the late reign of Mu of Baekje.

They did not lose their status as central nobles during the reign of the last King, Uija of Baekje by colluding with royal authority. The Buyeo clan (the royal family, 扶餘氏) acquired influence with the collapse of the Great Eight Families. After King Uija acceded the throne, royal might was also divided and the lineal descendant of the royal clan with the king as its center was in control of political situation. Among the Great Eight Families, Yeon and Baek clans fell behind and only clans of Sa and Guk maintained their status as central nobles. In the late Baekje all the Great Eight Families except for Sa and Guk clans lost their status as the central nobles and were degraded to local influence at last.

== Known Members ==
The records of the Yeon clan are sparse and broken making it hard to create a family tree but can be viewed as a timeline.

- 21st King: Gaeru of Baekje, 23rd King: Samgeun of Baekje
  - Yeon Sin (연신, 燕信, ?–478), held the position of Eunsol (恩率: 3rd official rank). He rebelled against the 23rd king, Samgeun of Baekje. Yeon Sin is the first person of the Yeon clan (燕氏) to show up in the Samguk Sagi. In 478 he rebelled against the king along with Hae Gu and was defeated. He fled to Goguryeo but was executed by beheading in the market square.
- 24th King: Dongseong of Baekje
  - Yeon Dol (연돌, 燕突, ?–?), appointed Dalsol (達率: 2nd official rank) in 490 and then in 497 appointed Minister of Defense (Byeong'gwan-jwa'pyeong, 兵官佐平) when the previous Minister of Defense, Jin Ro, died.
- 26th King: Seong of Baekje
  - Yeon Mo (연모, 燕謨, ?–?), was a general who was sent in 529 to defend Baekje when the King of Goguryeo, Anjang of Goguryeo attacked from the North. There is a theory that the man called "灼莫古" who was sent to Japan in 516 is the same person as Yeon Mo.
  - Yeon Hoe (연회, 燕會, ?–?), was a general who in 540 surrounded Usanseong Fortress (牛山城) of Goguryeo but King Anwon of Goguryeo attacked and set them to flight.

== See also ==
- Great Eight Families
- Jin clan
- Hae clan
- Mok clan
- Baekje
- Baekje Government
