= Yeon Sin =

Baekje nobleman (fl. 5th century)

- Hangul: 연신
- Hanja: 燕信
- RR: Yeon Sin
- MR: Yŏn Sin

Yeon Sin (? – 478) was a noble of Baekje, one of the Three Kingdoms of Korea. He was a member of the Yeon clan (燕氏), one of the "Great Eight Families" (Daeseongpaljok, 大姓八族). He held the position of Eunsol (恩率: 3rd official rank). He rebelled against the 23rd king, Samgeun of Baekje. Yeon Sin is the first person of the Yeon clan (燕氏) to show up in the Samguk Sagi.

After the 22nd king, Munju of Baekje was assassinated in 477 by Hae Gu, the 13 year old son of Munju, Samgeun of Baekje was crowned. Since he was not fit to oversee the military, the armies continued to be overseen by General Hae Gu, who maintained actual political control. In January, 478, Hae Gu made common cause with rebels based in Daedu Fortress led by Yeon Sin. Samgeun first sent the noble, the Sahei (佐平: 1st official rank) Jin Nam to capture the castle with 2,000 men, but he failed. He then sent the Dalsol (德率: 4th official rank) Jin Ro, who defeated the rebels with 500 men, whereupon Yeon Sin fled to Goguryeo. With this event, the Jin clan gained great strength in Baekje. Hae Gu was captured and executed. Yeon Sin was later beheaded in the market square.

== See also ==
- Buyeo Gonji
- Hae Gu
- Munju of Baekje
- Samgeun of Baekje
- List of Monarchs of Korea
- History of Korea
- Three Kingdoms of Korea
- List of Baekje people
