= Hae clan =

Ancient Korean noble clan

Hae clan 解
- Parent house: Goguryeo Go clan
- Titles: Various
- Founder: unknown
- Founding year: unknown

The Hae clan (解氏) was a powerful noble clan of Baekje, one of the Three Kingdoms of Korea.

== Origins ==
The Hae clan was probably the royal house before the Buyeo clan replaced them, and both clans appear descended from the lineage of Buyeo and Goguryeo. The royal family of Buyeo had the surname "Hae". The founding monarch of Goguryeo, Jumong had the surname "Hae" but the surname was changed to Go (高). The character (解) means "to loosen; to unfasten; to untie or to explain". It also means "sun" in Korean as Buyeo, Goguryeo and Baekje were deeply involved in Sun Worship.

== Baekje ==
They were one of the "Great Eight Families" (Daeseongpaljok, 大姓八族) of Baekje: (Sa (沙氏), Yeon (燕氏), Hyeop (劦氏), Hae (解氏), Jin (眞氏), Guk (國氏), Mok (木氏), and Baek (苩氏)). For generations the Hae monopolized providing queens for the Royal Family along with their rival, the Jin clan. This helped them gain high court positions in the government and military.

After the Battle at Mt. Amak fortress (阿莫山城) against Silla during the beginning of the reign of King Mu of Baekje the Great Eight Families lost a great deal of power. Among the families the Hae clan (who had led the battle), Hyeop, Jin and Mok disappeared from the central political stage leaving only the Yeon, Guk and Baek clans. The Sa clan promoted their influence by military force and produced a queen in the late reign of Mu of Baekje.

They did not lose their status as central nobles during the reign of the last King, Uija of Baekje by colluding with royal authority. The Buyeo clan (the royal family, 扶餘氏) acquired influence with the collapse of the Great Eight Families. After King Uija acceded the throne, royal might was also divided and the lineal descendant of the royal clan with the king as its center was in control of political situation. Among the Great Eight Families, Yeon and Baek clans fell behind and only clans of Sa and Guk maintained their status as central nobles. In the late Baekje all the Great Eight Families except for Sa and Guk clans lost their status as the central nobles and were degraded to local influence at last.

== Known members ==
The records of the Hae clan are sparse and broken making it hard to create a family tree but can be viewed as a timeline.

- Hae Mosu (解慕漱, ?-195BC), founder of Buyeo, said to be "the son of heaven".
- Hae Buru (解夫婁, 86-48BC), was king of Bukbuyeo and founder of Dongbuyeo.
- Hae Geumwa (解金蛙, ?–7BC), son of Hae Buru and second king of Dongbuyeo.
- Hae Daeso (解帶素, 60BC–22AD), son of Geumwa and third king of Dongbuyeo.
- 1st King: Onjo of Baekje, 2nd King: Daru of Baekje
  - Hae Ru (해루, 解婁, 55BC–34AD), one of the ten founders of Baekje. The Samguk Sagi says he was "well mannered and knowledgeable" In 23AD when he was 79 years old he was appointed Ubo (右輔) in charge of the military. He contributed greatly to the political stability of the end of the tempestuous period, and after the death of King Onjo and the crowning of King Daru he maintained his position of Ubo. He served for eleven years until his death at the age of 90 in 34AD (7th year of Daru's reign). He and greatly contributed to the expansion of Baekje's power and in the Samguk Sagi it says that King Daru mourned his death greatly.
- 11th King: Biryu of Baekje
  - Queen, of the Hae clan (王妃 解氏), was his wife
  - Hae Gu (해구, 解仇, ?–?), was appointed in 312 as Minister of Military Affairs (Byeong'gwan-jwa'pyeong, 兵官佐平). Not the same as Hae Gu who was appointed to the same position in 407 and is possibly his ancestor.
- 18th King: Jeonji of Baekje
  - Hae Chung (해충, 解忠, ?–?), during the power struggle of 405 when Prince Seolye killed his brother Prince Hunhae, Hae Chug, and inhabitant of Hanseong warned Jeonji not to enter the capital. Shortly afterwards Seolye was killed and Jeonji made king. Out of gratitude, Jeonji appointed several Hae clan members as ministers. In 406 Hae Chung was appointed Dalsol (達率, 2nd court rank). The next year in 407, Hae Su was appointed Naebeop-jwa’pyeong (內法佐平, Minister of Rituals) and Hae Gu as Byeong'gwan-jwa'pyeong (兵官佐平, Minister of Military Affairs).
- 18th King: Jeonji of Baekje until 23rd King: Samgeun of Baekje
  - Hae Gu (해구, 解仇, ?–478), appointed in 407 as Minister of Military Affairs (Byeong'gwan-jwa'pyeong, 兵官佐平) since the reign of King Jeonji. In August, 476 during the second year of the reign of King Munju of Baekje he was appointed Minister of Defense (Byeong'gwan'jwa'pyeong, 兵官佐平). In July, 477, Hae Gu who had obtained more power killed Buyeo Gonji, the younger brother of Munju. The King failed to gain control over the nobility and in the midst of this instability, the chief general Hae Gu took control of the military. In September the same year (477) Hae Gu sent an assassin and killed King Munju. The following year the 13-year-old son of Munju, Samgeun was crowned king. Since he was not fit to oversee the military, the armies continued to be overseen by General Hae Gu, who maintained actual political control. In January, 478, Hae Gu made common cause with rebels based in Daedu Fortress led by Eunsol (恩率: 3rd official rank) Yeon Sin (燕信). Samgeun first sent the noble, the Sahei (佐平: 1st official rank) Jin Nam to capture the castle with 2,000 men, but he failed. He then sent the Dalsol (德率: 4th official rank) Jin Ro, who defeated the rebels with 500 men, whereupon Yeon Sin fled to Goguryeo. With this event, the Jin clan gained great strength in Baekje. Hae Gu was captured and executed.
  - Hae Su (해수, 解須), appointed in 407 as Naebeop-jwa’pyeong (內法佐平, Minister of Rituals).
- 24th King: Dongseong of Baekje, 25th King: Muryeong of Baekje
  - Hae Myeong (해명, 解明, ?–501), had the position of Hansol (扞率, 5th court rank). When King Dongseong was killed by the noble Baek Ga (苩加) in 501 during a hunting trip, Hae Myeong joined his cause but Muryeong returned from Japan to take the throne and defeated them at Garimseong Fortress. Hae Myeong's dead body was thrown into the river.

== See also ==
- Great Eight Families
- Hae Gu
- Jin clan
- Baekje
- Baekje Government
