= Pŏp of Paekche =

29th King of Paekche (r. 599–600)

- Hangul: 선; 효순
- Hanja: 宣; 孝順
- RR: Seon; Hyosun
- MR: Sŏn; Hyosun

Monarch name
- Hangul: 법왕
- Hanja: 法王
- RR: Beobwang
- MR: Pŏbwang

Beop (Korean: 법; Hanja: 法; died 600; r. 599–600) was the 29th king of Paekche, one of the Three Kingdoms of Korea. He was the eldest son of King Hye. He reigned as Paekche power declined, having lost the Seoul region to the rival Silla kingdom.

He may have chosen his name, which translates as "law king" or "dharma king", to emphasize his identification with the Buddhist faith.

Beop's brief reign is mostly remembered for his ban on all killing, including hunting and butchering. He ordered the release of falcons and the burning of fishing and hunting tools. According to the Samguk yusa, this ban was established in the twelfth lunar month of 599.

He began construction on the Wangheungsa temple, which was completed late in his successor's reign, but later discoveries proved that the temple construction began in Wideok's time.

== Family ==
- Father: Hye
- Mother: unknown
  - Half-sister: Princess U Yŏng (우영공주; 優永公主, ?–?)
  - Queen: unknown
    - Son: Jin'ni-Ō (辰爾王, ?–?) – settled in Japan and became ancestor of the Ōuchi clan and Toyota clan.

== In popular culture ==
- Portrayed by Kim Young-ho in the 2005–06 SBS TV series Ballad of Seodong.

== See also ==
- Rulers of Korea
- History of Korea
- Three Kingdoms of Korea
- List of Monarchs of Korea

Pŏp of Paekche House of Buyeo Cadet branch of the House of Go Died: 600
Regnal titles
Preceded by Hye	King of Paekche; 599–600	Succeeded by Mu
