= Guk (disambiguation) =

Guk is a variety of soup-like dishes in Korean cuisine.

Guk or GUK may also refer to:

- Guk clan, of Baekje
- Guanylate kinase
