= Guisin of Baekje =

19th King of Baekje (r. 420–427)

- Hangul: 구이신왕
- Hanja: 久爾辛王
- RR: Guisinwang
- MR: Kuisinwang

Guisin (?–427, r. 420–427) was the nineteenth king of Baekje, one of the Three Kingdoms of Korea. He was the eldest son of King Jeonji and Lady Palsu.

The traditional dates of Guisin's rule are based on the Samguk sagi, however, only the date of enthronement and his death is recorded.

Based on more contemporaneous Chinese records, the historian J. W. Best has suggested that the years 414–429 or 430 are more plausible.

== Different accounts regarding the reign of the king ==
By the records of Samguk sagi, he reigned from 420 to 427 AD for eight years, which can be calculated from the record. However, the Book of Song does not mention Guisin as the king and goes straight from Jeonji (written as 餘映.Read as yeoyeong) to Biyu (written as 餘毗.Read as Yeobi) Nihon Shoki accounts that since Guisin was young that a figure called Mokumanchi (木滿致), son of Mokurakonshi (木羅斤資), ruled for him and quotes from a record of Baekje that is now lost.

== Family ==
- Father: Jeonji of Baekje
- Mother: Lady Palsu (八須夫人, 생몰년 미상) – from the Jin clan.
  - Queen: unknown
    - Buyeo Bi (扶餘毗, ?–455) – 20th King of Baekje, Biyu of Baekje. The Samguk sagi gives conflicting accounts of whether Biyu was Guisin's son or Jeonji's illegitim son.

== See also ==
- History of Korea
- List of Monarchs of Korea

Guisin of Baekje House of Buyeo Cadet branch of the House of Go Died: 427
Regnal titles
Preceded by Jeonji	King of Baekje; 420–427	Succeeded by Biyu
