= Hye of Baekje =

28th King of Baekje (r. 598–599)

- Hangul: 혜왕; 헌왕
- Hanja: 惠王; 獻王
- RR: Hyewang; Heonwang
- MR: Hyewang; Hŏnwang

King Hye (died 599) (r. 598–599) was the 28th king of Baekje, one of the Three Kingdoms of Korea.

The second son of the 26th king Seong, he assumed the throne after the death of his older brother and 27th king Wideok, but reigned only briefly before his own death. The Samguk yusa describes him as the son of Wideok, but this is considered an error.

His reign saw major inroads from the neighbouring Silla and Goguryeo kingdoms, with Silla occupying the present-day Seoul area and trading directly with China. Baekje's commercial positions along the Yellow Sea coast were now dominated by Goguryeo, trading outposts in China were lost to the Sui dynasty's unification, and Japan's political centralization outgrew Baekje's influence as well. The decline of external commerce and influence led to infighting among the nobility.

He was succeeded by his son Beop.

== Family ==
- Father: Seong of Baekje
- Mother: a concubine from the Yoon clan (延氏).
  - Half brother: Ajwa-Taeja (아좌태자; 阿佐太子, 572–645) – left to Japan in 597 where he was called "Asa-Taishi" and painted a portrait of Prince Shōtoku.
  - Half brother: unknown
  - Half brother: Imseong-Taeja (임성태자; 琳聖太子, 577–657) – he left to Japan in 611 where he was called "Rinshō-taishi" and became ancestor of the Ōuchi clan (大内氏).
  - Queen: unknown
    - Son: Buyeo Seon/Buyeo Hyosun (扶餘宣/扶餘孝順, ?–600) – 29th King of Baekje, Beop of Baekje.
  - Queen: unknown
    - Daughter: Princess Wu Yeong (우영공주; 優永公主, ?–?)

== In popular culture ==
- Portrayed by Park Tae-ho in the 2005–06 SBS TV series Ballad of Seodong.

== See also ==
- Rulers of Korea
- History of Korea
- Three Kingdoms of Korea
- List of Monarchs of Korea

Hye of Baekje House of Buyeo Cadet branch of the House of Go Died: 599
Regnal titles
Preceded by Wideok	King of Baekje; 598–599	Succeeded by Beop
