= Wanghŭngsa =

Former temple in Buyeo, South Korea

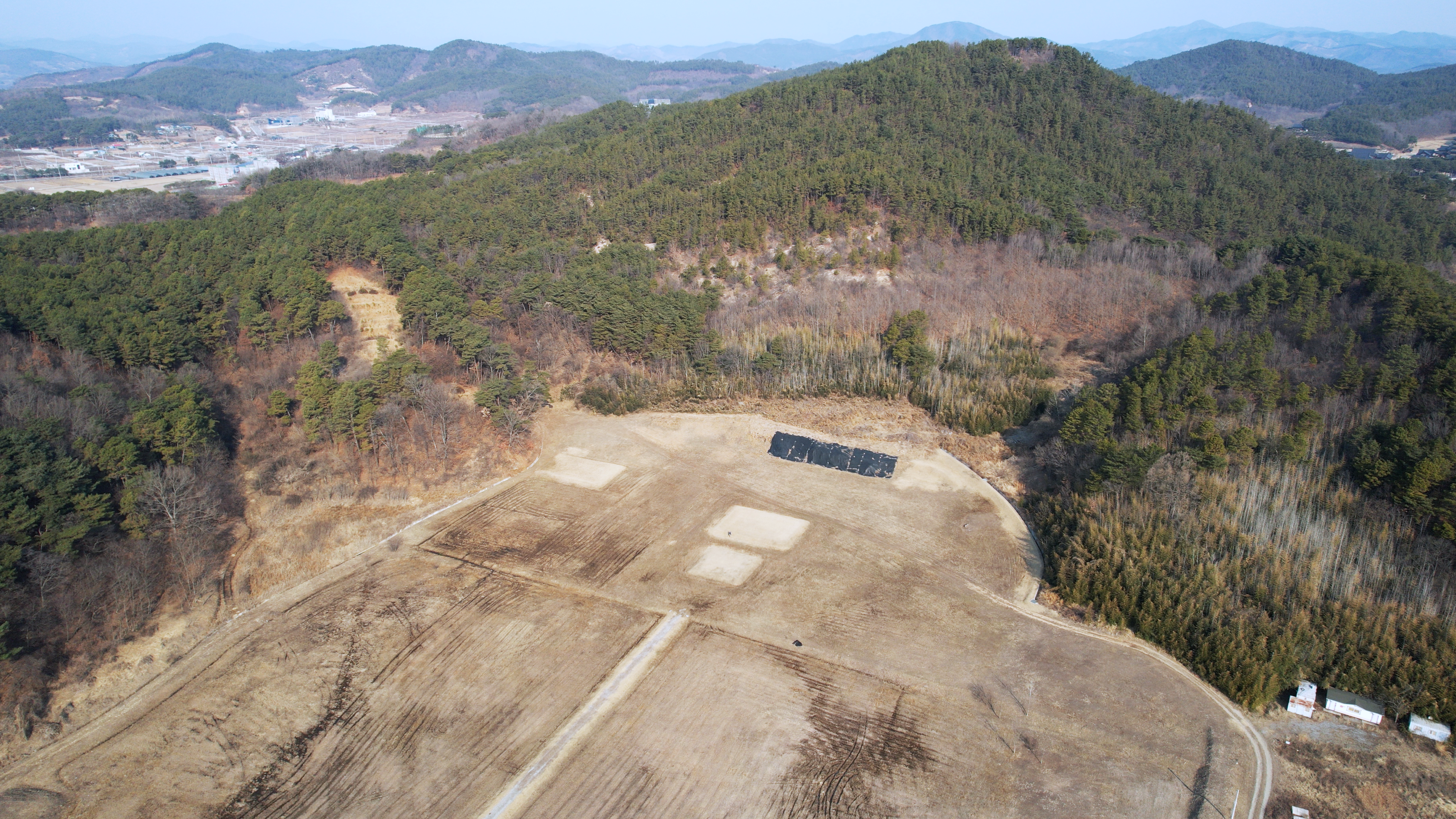
- Overview of the former site (2023)

Religion
- Affiliation: Korean Buddhism

Location
- Location: Buyeo County, South Chungcheong Province, South Korea
- Interactive map of Wanghŭngsa
- Coordinates: 36°17′47″N 126°54′25″E
- Historic Sites of South Korea
- Official name: Wangheungsa Temple Site, Buyeo
- Designated: 2001-02-05
- Reference no.: 427

Wanghŭngsa (Korean: 왕흥사; Hanja: 王興寺; RR: Wangheungsa) was a Baekje-era Buddhist temple in what is now Buyeo County, South Chungcheong Province, South Korea. On February 5, 2001, its former site was made Historic Site of South Korea No. 427.

It was founded in the year 577 (Korean calendar) during the reign of King Wideok. Wideok used to personally worship at the temple. After Baekje fell in 660, a small holdout group of Baekje soldiers fought from the temple and were all killed. The temple was then destroyed. The temple's location was then lost to history. It was rediscovered in 1934, during the 1910–1945 Japanese colonial period. A roof tile with the name of the temple was discovered at the site. It was made a Monument of South Chungcheong Province in 1982, and then upgraded to the national-level designation of Historic Site of South Korea in 2001.
