= Buyeo Seolye =

- Hangul: 부여설례
- Hanja: 扶餘碟禮
- RR: Buyeo Seolrye
- MR: Puyŏ Sŏllye

Buyeo Seolye (扶餘碟禮, ? – 405) was a prince of Baekje, one of the Three Kingdoms of Korea. He was the third son of the 15th king, Chimnyu of Baekje.

His older brother, Buyeo Abang, became the 17th kin, Asin of Baekje. The second brother, Hunhae was sent to Japan as a political hostage but returned to Baekje during his brother's reign. His brother, King Asin, died in 405 and Hunhae served as regent for Asin's son (who was also in Japan as a political hostage) who was returning from Japan. Seolye, who wanted to become the next king had his brother Hunhae killed but was himself killed by the returning Jeonji and the prime minister.

== See also ==
- Asin of Baekje
- Jeonji of Baekje
- Buyeo Hunhae
- Silla–Tang alliance
- History of Korea
- Three Kingdoms of Korea
- List of monarchs of Korea
