= Gaero of Baekje =

21st King of Baekje (r. 455–475)

- Hangul: 경사; 경
- Hanja: 慶司; 慶
- RR: Gyeongsa; Gyeong
- MR: Kyŏngsa; Kyŏng

Monarch name
- Hangul: 개로왕; 근개루왕
- Hanja: 蓋鹵王; 近蓋婁王
- RR: Gaerowang; Geungaeruwang
- MR: Kaerowang; Kŭn'gaeruwang

Gaero (?–475, 455–475) was the 21st king of Baekje, one of the Three Kingdoms of Korea. He was the eldest son of the 20th king Biyu. He died on Achasan as Baekje's capital in the present-day Pungnaptoseong region fell to the northern rival kingdom Goguryeo.

== Reign ==
He attempted to strengthen royal control of the aristocracy, by selecting officials from his own Buyeo clan, at the expense of the powerful Hae and Jin clans.

In 469, he ordered a surprise attack in which the city of Cheongmongnyeon (청목령, 靑木嶺; near modern Kaesong) was retaken from Goguryeo. In 472, he sent an embassy bearing tribute to Northern Wei requesting support against Goguryeo's attacks. However, these advances were rebuffed by the Wei court, which tried to avoid war with Goguryeo which had greater military power at the time, while fighting against Southern Dynasties.

In the early 470s, according to the Samguk sagi, King Jangsu of Goguryeo sent a Buddhist monk named Dorim, who was actually a Goguryeo agent. Dorim used Gaero's passion for the game of baduk to ingratiate himself, and persuade the king to neglect the country's defense in favor of public works.

== Fall of the capital ==
In 475, Jangsu launched an attack with 30,000 men and overran Baekje's defenses in seven days, taking the Han River valley including the capital. Gaero was taken to Acha Mountain Fortress and slain by two men who had defected to Goguryeo from Baekje. Baekje's ally Silla sent an army of 10,000, but arrived too late.

He was the last to rule Baekje from its historic heartland in the Han River valley. After his death, Hae Gu, of the suppressed Hae clan, led a bloody revolt.

== Family ==
- Father: Biyu of Baekje
- Mother: unknown
  - Queen: unknown
    - Buyeo Modo (扶餘牟都, ?–477) – 22nd King of Baekje, Munju of Baekje.
    - Buyeo Gonji (餘餘昆支, ?–477) – military commander and father of 24th King of Baekje, Dongseong of Baekje. He was sent to Japan in 461 where he had a son with a Japanese woman.

== Popular culture ==
- Portrayed by Lee Ki-young in the 2013 MBC TV series The King's Daughter, Soo Baek-hyang.

== See also ==
- History of Korea
- List of Monarchs of Korea

Gaero of Baekje House of Buyeo Cadet branch of the House of Go Died: 475
Regnal titles
Preceded by Biyu	King of Baekje; 455–475	Succeeded by Munju
