= Hae Gu =

Korean noble

- Hangul: 해구
- Hanja: 解仇
- RR: Hae Gu
- MR: Hae Ku

Hae Gu (? – 478) was a noble of Baekje, one of the Three Kingdoms of Korea. He was a member of the Hae clan (解氏), one of the "Great Eight Families" (Daeseongpaljok, 大姓八族). He held the position of Minister of Defense (Byeonggwanjwapyeong, 兵官佐平) during the reigns of the 22nd king, Munju of Baekje and his son the 23rd king, Samgeun of Baekje.

In August, 476 during the second year of the reign of King Munju of Baekje he was appointed Minister of Defense (Byeonggwanjwapyeong, 兵官佐平). In July, 477, Hae Gu who had obtained more power killed Buyeo Gonji, the younger brother of Munju. The King failed to gain control over the nobility and in the midst of this instability, the chief general Hae Gu took control of the military. In September the same year (477) Hae Gu sent an assassin and killed King Munju.

The following year the 13-year-old son of Munju, Samgeun was crowned king. Since he was not fit to oversee the military, the armies continued to be overseen by General Hae Gu, who maintained actual political control. In January, 478, Hae Gu made common cause with rebels based in Daedu Fortress led by Eunsol (恩率: 3rd official rank) Yeon Sin (燕信). Samgeun first sent the noble, the Sahei (佐平: 1st official rank) Jin Nam to capture the castle with 2,000 men, but he failed. He then sent the Dalsol (德率: 4th official rank) Jin Ro, who defeated the rebels with 500 men, whereupon Yeon Sin fled to Goguryeo. With this event, the Jin clan gained great strength in Baekje. Hae Gu was captured and executed.

== See also ==
- Buyeo Gonji
- Yeon Sin
- Munju of Baekje
- Samgeun of Baekje
- List of Monarchs of Korea
- History of Korea
- Three Kingdoms of Korea
- List of Baekje people
