= Jin'ni-Ō =

Prince of Baekje, son of the 29th king

- Hangul: 진이왕
- Hanja: 辰爾王
- Revised Romanization: Jiniwang
- McCune–Reischauer: Chiniwang

Jin'ni-Ō (辰爾王, ? – ?) was a prince of Baekje, one of the Three Kingdoms of Korea. He was son of the 29th king, Beop of Baekje and brother of the 30th king, Mu of Baekje. He settled in Japan and became ancestor of the Ōuchi clan and Toyota clan.

He does not appear in the Samguk Sagi or Samguk Yusa but in Japanese and Chinese records. In China he is recorded in the Book of Zhou, Fengsu tong, Wan Xing Tong Pu (萬姓統譜, Genealogies of Ten Thousand Surnames), and Xing pu. In Japan he is recorded in the Shinsen Shōjiroku.

His presence became known through a genealogy sent by Ōuchi Yoshihiro in July, 1398 to Joseon to confirm and prove his claim that he was a descendant of Prince Imseong. In the Shinsen Shōjiroku he is recorded as the 15th generation ancestor of the Ōuchi and Toyota clans.

== See also ==
- Beop of Baekje
- Silla–Tang alliance
- History of Korea
- Three Kingdoms of Korea
- List of monarchs of Korea

== Notes ==
King Pungjang House of Buyeo Cadet branch of the House of Go
Regnal titles
| Preceded by Uija | King of Baekje; 660–663 | Annexed by Tang and Silla |
Titles in pretence
| Loss of title | — TITULAR — King of Baekje; 663–677; Reason for succession failure: Battle of Baekgang | Succeeded by Buyeo Yung |
