= Heung Su =

- Hangul: 흥수
- Hanja: 興首
- RR: Heung Su
- MR: Hŭng Su

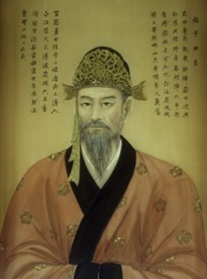
Heung Su

Heung Su (興首, ? – ?) was a politician and Prime Minister of Baekje, one of the Three Kingdoms of Korea. He is remembered for giving advice to the last king of Baekje, Uija of Baekje but was exiled for this. Many believe his advice would have saved the kingdom.

== Fall of Baekje ==
In 660 king Uija of Baekje sought to prepare for war against the Silla–Tang alliance seeking advice from Yeon Sin (義直) and the Dalsol, Sang Yeong (常永) but could not come to a decision. The king sent for Heung Su and asked his opinion. He said, "The number of hostages are high and the military is weak, moreover, they are conspiring with Silla. The Baekgang and Tanjeong rivers are the fortresses of our country, so you should keep the army behind them to prevent the Tang army to pass the Baekgang River. The king should keep the gate closed and even if the enemy's food rations fall and the enemy grows tired, wait for them to strike."

The princes did not believe him and said, "we must pass the Baekgang River and it will be like killing the chicken in the cage or catching the fish caught in the net." King Uija decided to go with the second plan and Baekje's army was destroyed and the capital fell to the enemy.

== Legacy ==
Samchungsa shrine in Buyeo County, South Chungcheong Province was built in 1957 in memory of three loyal officials of Baekje in the mid-7th century - Seong Chung, Heung Su and Gye Baek. When Uijawang, the last king of Baekje, governed his kingdom very badly, Seong Chung frequently advised the king in vain to change his ways. Angered at his advice the king put him in prison. He refused to eat and later died there. Heung Su desperately advised the king to keep the strategic military point of Tanhyeon, when the unified forces of Silla and China's Tang dynasty invaded Baekje. When General Kim Yu-Sin of Silla, commanding a military force of 50,000, attacked Baekje, General Gye Baek of Baekje, with an army of 5,000, fought heroically but they were all killed during the battle at Hwangsanbeol Field, in the year 660 CE.

== Popular culture ==
- Portrayed by Sim U Chang in the 1992-1993 KBS1 TV series The Three Kingdoms.
- Portrayed by Kim Yu-seok in the 2011 KBS1 TV series Gyebaek.
- Portrayed by Im Byeong Gi in the 2012-2013 KBS1 TV series Dream of the Emperor.

== See also ==
- Gwisil
- History of Korea
- Baekje
- Dochim
- Uija of Baekje
- Buyeo Pung
- Three Kingdoms of Korea
- List of monarchs of Korea
