= Chimnyu of Baekje =

15th King of Baekje (r. 384–385)

Chimnyu 침류왕
- Eoraha

King of Baekje
- Reign: April 384 – November 385 A.D.
- Coronation: April 384 A.D.
- Predecessor: Geungusu
- Successor: Jinsa
- Born: Buyeo Chimnyu; Unknown; Wiryeseong
- Died: November 385 A.D. Wiryeseong
- Consort: Lady Jin
- Issue: Asin; Heunhae; Seolry; Hong
- House: Buyeo
- Dynasty: Baekje
- Father: Geungusu
- Mother: Lady Jin Ai
- Religion: Buddhism
- Occupation: King

- Chimnyu of Baekje
- Hangul: 침류왕
- Hanja: 枕流王
- RR: Chimnyuwang
- MR: Ch'imnyuwang

King Chimnyu (died 385) (r. 384–385) was the fifteenth king of Baekje, one of the Three Kingdoms of Korea.

== Background ==
He was the eldest son of the 14th king, Geungusu and Lady Ai of the Jin clan. He became king upon Geungusu's death in 384 which was the 10th year of his reign.

== Reign ==
Samguk sagi:

- 384 AD, autumn, seventh month. Messengers were dispatched to the Jin court with tribute. Ninth month. The western monk Malananda came from Jin. The king received him, and kept him in the palace. All cordialities were extended to him. This was the first transmission of the Buddhist dharma to Baekje.
- 385 AD, spring, second month. They built a Buddhist temple at Mt. Hansan, and 10 people became monks. Winter, eleventh month. The king died.

== Legacy ==
He was the first Baekje king to officially recognize Buddhism. According to the Samguk sagi and Samguk yusa, the two oldest extant histories of Korea, Buddhism was officially introduced to Korea during the 4th century during the Three Kingdoms period. In 384, the Indian Buddhist monk Marananta came to Baekje from Eastern Jin. King Chimnyu welcomed him into the palace, and shortly thereafter adopted Buddhism. Archaeological discoveries have corroborated these assertions of the early introduction of Buddhism into Korea with the discovery of Goguryeo tomb murals with Buddhist motifs and the excavation of lotus shaped roof tiles dated to the 4th century. In 385, the king ordered that a Buddhist temple be built at the Baekje capital of Hansan (suggested, but not certain, to be at Bukhansanseong), and ten people became monks. After his death his brother Jinsa was crowned, but Chimnyu's eldest son became the next king, Asin of Baekje. After Asin's death in 405, his three other sons fought for the crown, ending in all of their deaths and the crowning of Asin's son.

== Family ==
- Father: Geungusu of Baekje
- Mother: Lady Ai (阿尒夫人) – daughter of Geungusu's chief minister Jin Godo (眞高道).
  - Brother: Buyeo Hwi (扶餘暉, ?–392) – 16th King of Baekje, Jinsa of Baekje.
  - Queen, of the Jin clan (眞氏)
    - 1st son: Buyeo Abang (扶餘阿芳, ?–405) – 17th King of Baekje, Asin of Baekje.
    - 2nd son: Buyeo Hunhae (扶餘訓解, ?–405) – was in Japan as a hostage where his children stayed and founded the Anko clan (雁高氏). Killed by his younger brother, Seolye, who tried to usurp the throne.
    - 3rd son: Buyeo Seolye (扶餘碟禮, ?–405) – was in Japan as a hostage. Killed his brother Hunhae to usurp the throne but was himself killed by his nephew and the prime minister.
  - Unknown concubine
    - 4th son: Buyeo Hong (扶餘洪, ?–407) – in February, 394 was appointed Minister of Internal Affairs (内臣佐平, Naesin-jwa'pyeong).

== See also ==
- Content in this article was copied from Samguk Sagi Scroll 23 at the Shoki Wiki, which is licensed under the Creative Commons Attribution-Share Alike 3.0 (Unported) (CC-BY-SA 3.0) license.
- List of monarchs of Korea
- Korean Buddhism
- History of Korea

Chimnyu of Baekje House of Buyeo Cadet branch of the House of Go Died: 385
Regnal titles
Preceded by Geungusu	King of Baekje; 384–385	Succeeded by Jinsa
