= Buyeo Hunhae =

Prince of Baekje (died 405)

- Hangul: 부여훈해
- Hanja: 扶餘訓解
- RR: Buyeo Hunhae
- MR: Puyŏ Hunhae

Buyeo Hunhae (Korean: 扶餘訓解, ? – 405) was a prince of Baekje, one of the Three Kingdoms of Korea. He was the second son of the 15th king, Chimnyu of Baekje.

His older brother, Buyeo Abang, became the 17th king, Asin of Baekje. Hunhae was sent to Japan as a political hostage but returned to Baekje during his brother's reign. His brother died in 405 and Hunhae served as regent for Asin's son (who was also in Japan as a political hostage) who was returning from Japan. The younger brother of Hunhae, Buyeo Seolye who wanted to become king himself had Hunhae killed but was himself killed by the returning Jeonji and the prime minister.

Hunhae's descendants who stayed in Japan became founders of the Anko clan (Japanese: 雁高氏) as recorded in the Japanese genealogical compilation, Shinsen Shōjiroku.

== See also ==
- Silla–Tang alliance
- History of Korea
- Three Kingdoms of Korea
- List of monarchs of Korea
