= Geungusu of Baekje =

14th King of Baekje (r. 375–384)

Geungusu 근구수
- Eoraha
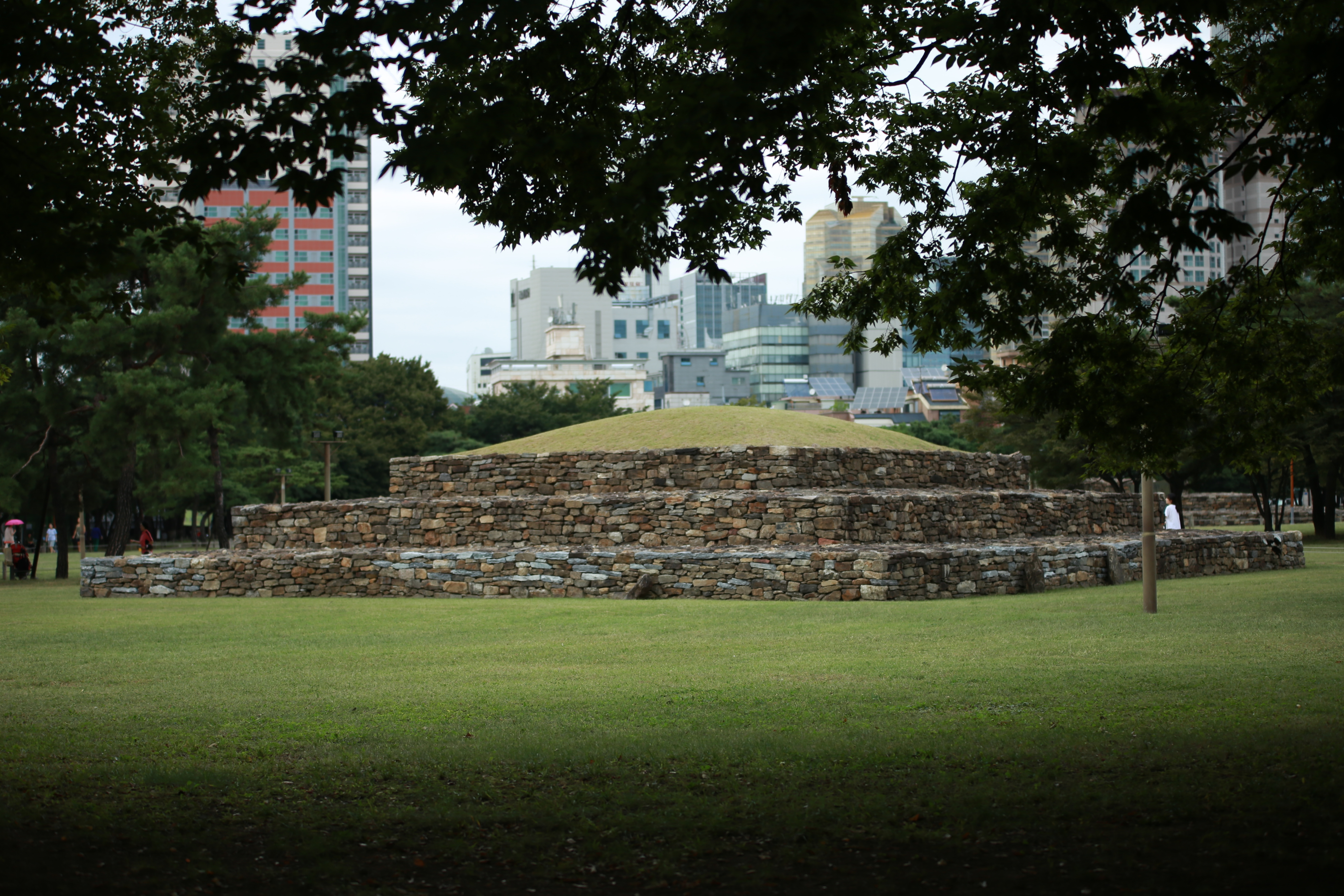
- Possible tomb of King Geungusu

King of Baekje
- Reign: November 375 – April 384 A.D.
- Coronation: November 375 A.D.
- Predecessor: Geunchogo
- Successor: Chimnyu
- Born: Buyeo Su; Unknown; Wiryeseong
- Died: April 384 A.D. Wiryeseong
- Burial: Seokjongdong No.3 (possible)
- Consort: Lady Jin Ai
- Issue: Buyeo Chimnyu; Buyeo Jinsa
Regnal name
- Gusu Eoraha; Goisu Eoraha; Geungoisu Eoraha; Goiryu Eoraha
- House: Buyeo
- Dynasty: Baekje
- Father: Geunchogo
- Mother: Lady Buyeo Hwa
- Occupation: King

- Geungusu of Baekje
- Hangul: 수
- Hanja: 須
- RR: Su
- MR: Su

Monarch name
- Hangul: 근구수왕
- Hanja: 近仇首王
- RR: Geungusuwang
- MR: Kŭn'gusuwang

King Geungusu (died 384, r. 375–384) was the fourteenth king of Baekje, one of the Three Kingdoms of Korea.

== Background and rise to the throne ==
Geungusu was the eldest son of the 13th king Geunchogo, and father to the 15th king Chimnyu and the 16th king Jinsa. In 369, as crown prince, Geungusu led the Baekje armies against invading troops of the northern Korean kingdom Goguryeo, capturing 5,000 prisoners. He pushed on to Pyongyang and Sugok-seong in 371, killing Goguryeo's king Gogugwon in battle.

He continued his father's policies, and his father's alliance with the Jin clan. His chief minister, Jin Godo (眞高道), was the father of his queen, Lady Ai (阿尒夫人).

== Reign ==
During Geungusu's reign, Baekje was in hostile relations with its northern neighbor, Goguryeo, because of Baekje's attacks on Pyongyang, and the murder of a Goguryeo king during one of the battles. He continued these hostilities as king, taking Pyongyang in 377 with 30,000 men. Had he pushed onto Goguryeo, which was still under turmoil with Gogugwon's death, then Baekje would have completed the conquest of Goguryeo.

Baekje continued as the military and economic power it was during his father's reign. Geungusu maintained friendly relations with China and Yamato period Japan. He is recorded in the Nihonshoki as having sent the noted Baekje scholar Wang In to Japan with copies of the Analects of Confucius and one copy of the Thousand Character Classic. However, on the basis of Korean accounts some believe that this took place decades later, in the reign of King Asin.

There were several astonishing weather-related events during his reign, such as the raining dirt incident in 379. A severe drought in 382 also showed the king's love for his people, as he opened up the kingdom's food storages and fed the people.

Samguk sagi: "King Geungusu was also called Hwisu. Geungusu was the son of King Geunchogo. Previously, Sayu, king of Goguryeo, himself came and invaded. King Geunchogo dispatched the crown prince to repel them, and he reached Bangeolyang and was goiung to give battle. A man from Goguryeo called Sagi, who was originally a man from Baekje and had mistakenly injured the hoof of the king's steed, feared punishment and fled to Goguryeo. Returning to Baekje at this time, he told the crown prince, "Their soldiers are many, but all of their numbers are meant to deceive you. The only valiant troops are the ones with the red banners — if you first break them, the other troops will not attack and flee of their own accord." The crown prince followed his advice, and attacked and put them to a great rout, and he pursued them to the north, reaching all the way to the northwest of the fortress of Sugok. General Makgohae then admonished him, saying "I have heard the taoists say, "Know when you have enough, and you will not be humiliated. Know when to stop, and you will not put yourself in danger. Now we have gained much: why do we need to seek more?" The prince thought it good and stopped, and raised a mound of rocks as a memorium. Then he climbed to the top of it and said to those around him, "After today, who will again come to this place?" The earth there is full of cliffs and rocks, and cracked like the hoof of a horse. Other people, up to the present, stil call this place "the hoofprints of the crown prince." Geunchogo died in the 30th year of his reign, and Geungusu succeeded him."

- 376 AD, The king's uncle on his mother's side, Jin Godo, was made Minister of the Interior. He was entrusted with matters of the administration. Winter, eleventh month. Goguryeo came and invaded the northern borders.
- 377 AD, winter, tenth month. The king, his general, and 30,000 men invaded Goguryeo and attacked the fortress of Pyongyang. 11th year. Goguryeo came to attack.
- 379 AD, spring, third month. An envoy was sent to the Jin court. This envoy went by sea and ran into a foul wind, and could not reach their destination and so returned. Summer, fourth month. It rained dirt for one day.
- 380 AD, There was a great pestilence. Summer, fifth month. There was a fissure in the earth that was five jang deep and three jang wide. After three days, it closed.
- 382 AD, spring. There was no rain until the sixth month. The people starved, to the point that some sold their children. The king sent public officials to give them grain.
- 384 AD, spring, second month. There were three halos around the sun. Inside the palace, the king struck a great drum. Summer, fourth month. The king died.

== Death and succession ==
Geungusu died in 384, after 10 years of reign. He was succeeded by his eldest son, Chimnyu of Baekje, who was Crown Prince of Baekje at the time.

== Family ==
- Father: Geunchogo of Baekje
- Mother: Buyeo Hwa – from Wiryegung.
  - Queen: Jin Ai, honorary known as Lady Ai of the Seosan Jin clan (아이부인 서산진씨 진아이, 阿尒(尓)夫人 瑞山眞氏 眞阿尒; r. 375–?) – daughter of Geungusu's chief minister Jin Godo (진고도; 眞高道).
    - Buyeo Chimnyu (扶餘枕流, ?–385) – 15th King of Baekje, Chimnyu of Baekje.
    - Buyeo Hwi (扶餘暉, ?–392) – 16th King of Baekje, Jinsa of Baekje.

== Popular culture ==
- Portrayed by Park Geon-il in the 2010–2011 KBS1 TV series The King of Legend.
- Portrayed in the 2017 KBS TV series Chronicles of Korea.

== See also ==
- List of monarchs of Korea
- History of Korea

Geungusu of Baekje House of Buyeo Cadet branch of the House of Go Died: 384
Regnal titles
Preceded by Geunchogo	King of Baekje; 375–384	Succeeded by Chimnyu
