= Buyeo Gyogi =

- Hangul: 부여교기
- Hanja: 扶餘翹岐
- RR: Buyeo Gyogi
- MR: Puyŏ Kyogi

Buyeo Gyogi (扶餘翹岐, ? – 677) was a prince of Baekje, one of the Three Kingdoms of Korea. He was the second son of the 30th king, Mu of Baekje and half-brother of the 31st king, Uija of Baekje.

In 642 he was exiled along with his mother and sister and 40 noblement to the islands of Japan. This was an attempt by the new king and his half-brother, Uija, to gain back power from the aristocracy but instead led to more resentment and political instability. What happened to Gyogi in Japan is mostly unknown.

Many of his other family members settled in Japan as well as his nephew, Zenkō (善光 or 禅広), who settled in Japan and was given the family name Kudara no Konikishi (百濟王; king of Baekje) by the emperor of Japan.

== See also ==
- Uija of Baekje
- Silla–Tang alliance
- History of Korea
- Three Kingdoms of Korea
- List of monarchs of Korea
