= Biyu of Baekje =

20th King of Baekje (r. 427–455)

- Hangul: 비유왕
- Hanja: 毗有王
- RR: Biyuwang
- MR: Piyuwang

Biyu (died 455, r. 427–455) was the twentieth king of Baekje, one of the Three Kingdoms of Korea.

According to the Samguk sagi he was Guisin's son, while other sources name Biyu as the illegitimate son of the 18th king Jeonji. It is not known which sources are right. (Since Guisin died young, it is likely that the stories about Biyu being Jeonji's son may be possible.)

The traditional dates of Biyu's rule are based on the Samguk sagi. On the basis of more contemporaneous Chinese records, Best (1979) has suggested that the years 428 or 429–455 are more plausible.

Within the Korean Peninsula, Biyu sought to strengthen Baekje's relationship with Silla, exchanging ambassadors in 433 and 434. Although Silla was a protectorate of Goguryeo at this time, Silla and Baekje allied themselves against Goguryeo (Naje Dongmaeng; 나제동맹; 羅濟同盟).

== Family ==
- Father: Guisin of Baekje or Jeonji of Baekje
- Mother: unknown
  - Queen: unknown
    - Buyeo Gyeongsa (扶餘慶司, ?–475) – 21st King of Baekje, Gaero of Baekje.

== See also ==
- List of Monarchs of Korea
- History of Korea

Biyu of Baekje House of Buyeo Cadet branch of the House of Go Died: 455
Regnal titles
Preceded by Guisin	King of Baekje; 427–455	Succeeded by Gaero
