= Jinsa of Baekje =

16th King of Baekje (r. 385–392)

Jinsa 진사
- Eoraha

King of Baekje
- Reign: November 385 – November 392 A.D.
- Coronation: November 385 A.D.
- Predecessor: Chimnyu
- Successor: Asin
- Born: Buyeo Jinsa/Hwi; Unknown
- Died: November 392 A.D.
- Consort: Lady Hae
- Issue: Buyeo Jinseon
- House: Buyeo
- Dynasty: Baekje
- Father: Geungusu
- Mother: Lady Jin Ai
- Religion: Buddhism
- Occupation: King

- Jinsa of Baekje
- Hangul: 진사왕
- Hanja: 辰斯王
- RR: Jinsawang
- MR: Chinsawang

King Jinsa (?–392, 385–392) was the sixteenth king of Baekje, one of the Three Kingdoms of Korea.

== Life ==
He was the younger brother of the previous ruler, King Chimnyu. According to the Samguk sagi, he ascended to the throne because the heir, later King Asin, was too young. However, according to the Japanese Nihon Shoki he usurped the throne by force.

He ordered numerous attacks against Goguryeo, which was expanding into Baekje territory from the north. In the year 386, he commanded all men living in Cheongmongnyeong (靑木嶺, present-day Kaesong), above the age of fifteen, to move north and west to defend the borders. He sent the noble Jin Gamo to attack the Goguryeo Dogon Castle, which was conquered. However, in 392 King Gwanggaeto of Goguryeo counterattacked and seized most of the Baekje territory north of the Han River. In the tenth month of that year, Goguryeo troops took Gwanmi Castle and threatened the Baekje palace.

According to the Samguk sagi, Jinsa died while hunting at a satellite palace in Guwon. According to the Nihon Shoki, Japanese diplomats were sent to Baekje to condemn Jinsa for disrespecting the Japanese emperor, and Jinsa was executed by Baekje as an apology. The Japanese diplomats then put Asin in power and returned to Japan.

== Family ==
- Father: Geungusu of Baekje
- Mother: Lady Ai (阿尒夫人) – daughter of Geungusu's chief minister Jin Godo (眞高道).
  - Brother: Buyeo Chimnyu (扶餘枕流, ?–385) – 15th King of Baekje, Chimnyu of Baekje.
- Queen, of the Hae clan (海氏)
  - Son: Prince Jinson (百濟 辰孫王, 356–?) – settled in Japan where he was called "Shinson-Ō" and became ancestor of the Sugano clan (菅野氏) and founded Fuji-dera (葛井寺).

== Popular culture ==
- Portrayed by Park Sang Gyu in the 2011–2012 KBS1 TV series Gwanggaeto, The Great Conqueror.

== See also ==
- History of Korea
- List of Monarchs of Korea

Jinsa of Baekje House of Buyeo Cadet branch of the House of Go Died: 392
Regnal titles
Preceded by Chimnyu	King of Baekje; 385–392	Succeeded by Asin
