= Prince Asa =

- Hangul: 아좌태자
- Hanja: 阿佐太子
- RR: Ajwa taeja
- MR: Ajwa t'aeja

Prince Asa (阿佐太子, Asa Taishi; 572–645), was the eldest son of King Wideok of Baekje who was sent to Japan in April, 597 to teach the Japanese Buddhism and become teacher of Prince Shōtoku. In Korea he was known as "Ajwa-taeja".

He was also a talented artist and is known for the portrait of Prince Shōtoku which still hangs in Horyu-ji temple. It is the oldest known portraiture in Japan. It depicts Prince Shōtoku in pilgrims clothing with the young princes Prince Yamashiro no Ōe on the right and Prince Eguri on the left.

His younger brother Imseong-Taeja (임성태자, 琳聖太子, 577–657) settled in Japan in 611 where he was called "Rinshō-taishi" and became ancestor of the Ōuchi clan (大内氏).

== In popular culture ==
- Portrayed by Jung Jae-gon in the 2005–06 SBS TV series Ballad of Seodong.

== See also ==
- Baekje
- List of Monarchs of Korea
- Wideok of Baekje
- Prince Imseong
