= Samgeun of Baekje =

23rd King of Baekje (r. 477–479)

- Hangul: 삼근왕; 삼걸왕; 임걸왕
- Hanja: 三斤王; 三乞王; 壬乞王
- RR: Samgeunwang; Samgeorwang; Imgeorwang
- MR: Samgŭnwang; Samgŏrwang; Imgŏrwang

Samgeun (465–479) (r. 477–479) was the 23rd king of Baekje, one of the Three Kingdoms of Korea. According to the Samguk sagi, he was the eldest son of the 22nd king Munju.

== Background ==
In 475, the northern Korean kingdom of Goguryeo had forced Baekje's capital south from the present-day Seoul region to Ungjin (near present-day Gongju), and the Baekje court had lost much of its power to the aristocracy. Within the aristocracy, clans from the local Mahan confederacy, which Baekje conquered and absorbed earlier, gained strength against the traditional clans descended from the northern kingdom of Buyeo.

In the midst of this instability, the chief general and Minister of Defense, Hae Gu, took control of the military and killed Munju's brother Buyeo Gonji in 477. After this Hae Gu exercised effective rule over the country. That year, he ordered the death of Munju.

== Reign ==
Samgeun was only thirteen years old when he took power after his father's death. Since he was not fit to oversee the military, the armies continued to be overseen by General Hae Gu, who maintained actual political control.

In 478, Hae Gu found common cause with rebels led by Yeon Sin, based in Daedu Castle. Samgeun first sent the noble Jin Nam to capture the castle with 2,000 men, but he failed. He then sent Jin Ro, who defeated the rebels with 500 men, whereupon Yeon Sin fled to Goguryeo. With this event, the Jin clan gained great strength in Baekje.

The next year, Samgeun died, succeeded by his uncle Buyeo Gonji's son, Dongseong of Baekje. His tomb is presumbed to be Tomb Nr. 2 at the Royal Tombs in Songsan-ri.

== Family ==
- Father: Munju of Baekje
- Mother: Queen, of the Gwak clan (郭氏)

== See also ==
- History of Korea
- List of Monarchs of Korea

Samgeun of Baekje House of Buyeo Cadet branch of the House of Go Born: 465 Died: 479
Regnal titles
Preceded by Munju	King of Baekje; 477–479	Succeeded by Dongseong
