= Dongseong of Baekje =

24th King of Baekje (r. 479–501)

- Hangul: 모대; 마제; 여대
- Hanja: 牟大; 麻帝; 餘大
- RR: Modae; Maje; Yeodae
- MR: Modae; Maje; Yŏdae

Monarch name
- Hangul: 동성왕
- Hanja: 東城王
- RR: Dongseongwang
- MR: Tongsŏngwang

Dongseong (died 501) was the 24th king of Baekje, one of the Three Kingdoms of Korea, reigning from 479 to 501.

== Background ==
He was the son of Buyeo Gonji, the younger brother of the 22nd king Munju who returned to Baekje from Yamato Japan in 477 after hearing of the fall of the Baekje capital. Gonji died that same year, and like Munju, he may have been murdered by Hae Gu. Dongseong appears to have been promoted to the throne by the Jin clan, which prevailed over Hae Gu's rebellion. After Samgeun died without children, the throne passed to Dongseong.

== Reign ==
He worked to strengthen the court's power after the move of the capital from the present-day Seoul area to Ungjin. He built several fortresses and castles to build out the new capital. He incorporated the local Sa, Yeon, and Baek clans into the court to counter the entrenched aristocracy from the former capital.

Dongseong sent a tribute mission to the Southern Qi in 484, reopening Baekje's ties with southern China after a long hiatus.

He established an alliance with Silla through his marriage of a Silla noblewoman in 493, and the two countries united in attacking Goguryeo in 495.

In 498, the Baekje army subjugated Tamna, the kingdom on Jeju Island which had formally accepted Baekje rule twenty-two years before, because it failed to send tributes.

The Book of Qi states that Dongseong sent armies to Liaodong and Liaoxi (요서 遼西) in China to defeat Goguryeo forces.

== Death ==
Beginning in 499, the country was stricken by famine, but according to the Samguk sagi the king was unresponsive. He continued to live an indulgent lifestyle while brigandage spread.

By the end of Dongseong's rule, the local clans of the new capital had eclipsed the traditionally powerful Hae and Jin clans, and even pressured the throne. Dongseong sought to contain them by exiling Baek Ga, the highest-ranked official in the court, to an outlying castle. This caused great resentment, and Baek Ga's forces assassinated Dongseong while he was hunting.

== Family ==
- Father: Buyeo Gonji (son of the 21st King, Gaero of Baekje)
- Mother: unknown
    - Queen: unknown
  - Son: Buyeo Sama/Buyeo Yung (扶餘斯摩/扶餘隆, 462–523) – 25th King of Baekje, Muryeong of Baekje
    - Concubine: unknown – from the Jin clan
    - Concubine: unknown – from Lee clan of Silla (伊飡 比智女를), married 493
      - Daughter: Princess Bogwa (보과공주; 宝果公主) – consort of the 23rd King of Silla, Beopheung of Silla.

== Popular culture ==
- Portrayed by Jung Chan in the 2013 MBC TV series The King's Daughter, Soo Baek-hyang.

== See also ==
- History of Korea
- List of Monarchs of Korea

Dongseong of Baekje House of Buyeo Cadet branch of the House of Go Died: 501
Regnal titles
Preceded by Samgeun	King of Baekje; 479–501	Succeeded by Muryeong
