= Munju of Baekje =

22nd King of Baekje (r. 475–477)

- Hangul: 문주왕
- Hanja: 文周王
- RR: Munjuwang
- MR: Munjuwang

Munju (?–477, r. 475–477) was the 22nd king of Baekje, one of the Three Kingdoms of Korea. His reign saw considerable disunity within Baekje following the fall of its capital in present-day Seoul.

== Background ==
He was the first king to rule Baekje from its new capital in Ungjin, present-day Gongju, after the Han River valley was lost to Goguryeo. He ascended to the throne after his father's death in the sack of the former Baekje capital at Hanseong.

Prior to 475, Munju served as chief minister (Sang-jwa'pyeong, 上佐平) under his father, Gaero. In the Goguryeo assault of 475, he went to Silla to request help. According to the Samguk sagi, he returned with 10,000 Silla warriors but was too late to prevent the fall of the capital.

== Reign ==
After the move of the capital, the Baekje power structure fell into chaos when the traditional Buyeo-descended aristocracy clashed with the local Mahan-based clans; rivalry within the old aristocracy, suppressed by previous powerful kings, resurfaced.

He sought to refortify Baekje's remaining defenses and strengthen the country's position against Goguryeo. He was successful in 476 in gaining suzerainty over the kingdom of Tamna on Jeju Island.

In the midst of this instability, the chief general and Minister of Defense, Hae Gu, took control of the military and killed Munju's brother Buyeo Gonji in 477. After this Hae Gu exercised effective rule over the country.

That year, Munju was murdered by an agent of Hae Gu.

== Family ==
- Father: Gaero of Baekje
- Mother: unknown
  - Brother: Buyeo Gonji (餘餘昆支, ?–477) – military commander and father of 24th King of Baekje, Dongseong of Baekje. He was sent to Japan in 461 where he had a son with a Japanese woman.
  - Queen: unknown
    - Buyeo Samgeol/Buyeo Imgeol (扶餘三乞/扶餘壬乞, ?–479) – 23nd King of Baekje, Samgeun of Baekje.

== See also ==
- History of Korea
- List of Monarchs of Korea

Munju of Baekje House of Buyeo Cadet branch of the House of Go Died: 477
Regnal titles
Preceded by Gaero	King of Baekje; 475–477	Succeeded by Samgeun
