= Great Eight Families =

Korean noble families of the Three Kingdoms era

- Hangul: 대성팔족
- Hanja: 大姓八族
- Revised Romanization: Daeseongpaljok
- McCune–Reischauer: Taesŏngp'alchok

The Great Eight Families (大姓八族, Daeseongpaljok) were eight noble families of Baekje, one of the Three Kingdoms of Korea. They were the most powerful of the noble families and had been comrades in arms with the founding monarch Onjo of Baekje. They reached the pinnacle of their power during the Sabi, recorded in Chinese records such as Tongdian.

The Hae clan and the Jin clan were the representative royal houses who had considerable power from the early period of Baekje, and they produced many queens over several generations. The Hae clan was probably the royal house before the Buyeo clan replaced them, and both clans appear descended from the lineage of Buyeo and Goguryeo.

== History ==
After the Battle at Mt. Amak fortress (阿莫山城) against Silla during the beginning of the reign of King Mu of Baekje the Great Eight Families lost a great deal of power. Among the families the Hae clan (who had led the battle), Hyeop, Jin and Mok disappeared from the central political stage leaving only the Yeon, Guk and Baek clans. The Sa clan promoted their influence by military force and produced a queen in the late reign of Mu of Baekje.

They did not lose their status as central nobles during the reign of the last King, Uija of Baekje by colluding with royal authority. The royal family (Buyeo clan, 扶餘氏) acquired influence with the collapse of the Great Eight Families. After King Uija acceded the throne, royal might was also divided and the lineal descendant of the royal clan with the king as its center was in control of political situation. Among the Great Eight Families, Yeon and Baek clans fell behind and only clans of Sa and Guk maintained their status as central nobles. In the late Baekje all the Great Eight Families except for Sa and Guk clans lost their status as the central nobles and were degraded to local influence at last.

== Families ==
- Jin clan (眞氏) – produced queens of Baekje.
- Hae clan (解氏) – produced queens of Baekje.
- Mok clan (木氏)
- Baek clan (苩氏)
- Guk clan (國氏)
- Hyeop clan (劦氏)
- Yeon clan (燕氏)
- Sa clan (沙氏)

== See also ==
- History of Korea
- Three Kingdoms of Korea
