= Government of Paekche =

Government of the Koreanic state

Paekche was one of the Three Kingdoms of Korea which lasted from 18 BCE to 660 CE. The establishment of a centralized state in Paekche is usually traced to the reign of King Goi, who may have first established patrilineal succession. Like most monarchies, a great deal of power was held by the aristocracy. King Seong, for example, strengthened royal power, but after he was slain in a disastrous campaign against Silla, the nobles took much of that power away from his son.

The Hae clan and the Jin clan were the representative royal houses who had considerable power from the early period of Paekche, and they produced many queens over several generations. The Hae clan was probably the royal house before the Buyeo clan (扶餘氏) replaced them, and both clans appear descended from the lineage of Buyeo and Goguryeo. The "Great Eight Families" (Sa, Yeon, Hyeop, Hae, Jin, Guk, Mok, and Baek) were powerful nobles in the Sabi era, recorded in Chinese records such as Tongdian.

== Royal Family ==
The Buyeo clan (扶餘氏) was the royal family of Paekche. The King used the title of "Eoraha" (於羅瑕), "Ha" meaning "rulers" and "Eora" meaning "the largest". The common people called the king "Geon’gilji" (鞬吉支). The queen was called "Eoryuk" (於陸). Also the title Taeja (태자; 太子) was given to sons of emperor not like other east Asian countries. In other countries, this title meant crown prince. Wang (왕; 王), or king, was a Chinese royal style used in many states rising from the dissolution of Gojoseon, Buyeo, Goguryeo, Paekche, Silla and Balhae, Goryeo.

== 18 BCE-260 CE ==
After the kingdom was founded by Onjo of Baekje, there were two ranks: Jwabo (左輔) and Ubo (右輔).

These two ranks existed for more than 200 years in the early days of Paekche. The "bo" (輔) type officials are found in Goguryeo and Silla as well as in Chinese history. In China, Jwabo were one of the Sarin (四隣) who assisted a King and were advisors for the Crown Prince. Moreover, there were Jwabo, Ubo and Gyeongbo (京輔) during the Han Dynasty whose job it was to administer and defend the capital. In Goguryeo there were the positions Jwabo, Ubo and Daebo (大輔). The Daebo was a symbolic position but both the Jwabo and Ubo were similar to Prime Ministers who took part in politics and national defense. In Silla there was only a Daebo who were advisers of the king; The first to hold the position: Talhae (脫解), Hogong (瓠公) and Algi (閼智) were all foreigners who settled in Silla.

In Paekche, records of the Jwabo and Ubo are found five times during the reign of the founding monarch, Onjo of Baekje and his son and successor Daru of Baekje. After a 200-year gap, during the reign of the 8th king, Goi of Baekje they were mentioned two times. He appointed Euleum (乙音) as Ubo and assistant to the king.

After Goi the Ubo were charged with national security and military affairs. We can also find people who were given positions like Dongbu (東部) and Bukbu (北部) that were written in front of their name in historical materials. They were placed in the surrounding of the capital to defend it from the North and East, battling with the Nangnang (樂浪) and Malgal (靺鞨). This was similar to the Sambo (三輔) of the Han Dynasty who were installed around a capital in charge of defense. During this time the Jwabo and Ubo in Goguryeo had similar jobs as the ones in Paekche. When King Goi of Paekche made political reforms in 260 the positions of Jwabo and Ubo were replaced by the new ministers called jwa'pyeong, and after handing over their roles disappeared.

== Reform of 260-262 ==
In 260 King Goi of Baekje reformed the political structure of Paekche and started the 16 rank system and the six ministers (jwa’pyeong). In 262 he made the Yull'yeong Law Code and promulgated rules for color-coded official garments. The king proclaimed that the first six ranks should don purple outerware, and hang silver flowers from their crown. Those above the eleventh rank would wear crimson, and those of sixteenth or higher blue.

The 16 Rank System:

- 1st Rank: Sahe or jwa’pyeong (佐平) consisted of six ministers (jwa'pyeong) charged with different roles of government. According to the Samguk Yusa, during the Sabi period, the chief minister (Sang-jwa'pyeong) of Paekche was chosen by a unique system. The names of several candidates were placed under a rock (Cheonjeongdae) near Hoamsa temple. After a few days, the rock was moved and the candidate whose name had a certain mark was chosen as the new chief minister. Whether this was a form of selection by lot or a covert selection by the elite is not clear.
  - Sang-jwa'pyeong (上佐平) – Chief Minister (Prime Minister).
    - Byeong'gwan-jwa'pyeong (兵官佐平) – Minister of Defense (Military Affairs).
    - Naesin-jwa’pyeong (内臣佐平, 內臣佐平) – Minister of the Interior (Internal Affairs and Communication of Royal Edicts).
    - Naedu-jwa’pyeong (內頭佐平) – Minister of Finance.
    - Naebeop-jwa’pyeong (內法佐平) – Minister of Rituals.
    - Wisa-jwa’pyeong (衛士佐平) – Minister of the Royal Guards.
    - Jojeong-jwa’pyeong (朝廷佐平) – Minister of Justice.
- 2nd-6th Ranks: Sol (率)
  - 2nd Rank: Dalsol (達率)
  - 3rd Rank: Eunsol (恩率)
  - 4th Rank: Deoksol (德率)
  - 5th Rank: Hansol (扜率)
  - 6th Rank: Nasol (奈率)
- 7th-11th Ranks: Deok (德)
  - 7th Rank: Jangdeok (將德)
  - 8th Rank: Sideok (施德)
  - 9th Rank: Godeok (固德)
  - 10th Rank: Gyedeok (季德)
  - 11th Rank: Daedeok (對德)
- 12th-16th Ranks:
  - 12th Rank: Mundok (文督)
  - 13th Rank: Mudok (武督)
  - 14th Rank: Jwagun (佐軍)
  - 15th Rank: Jinmu (振武)
  - 16th Rank: Geuke (克虞)

== See also ==
- Three Kingdoms of Korea
- Crown of Baekje
- Wiryeseong
- Ungjin Commandery
- Great Eight Families
- Jin clan
- Hae clan
- List of Baekje people
- List of Baekje researchers
- List of Baekje monarchs
