= Buyeo Gonji =

- Hangul: 부여곤지
- Hanja: 扶餘昆支
- RR: Buyeo Gonji
- MR: Puyŏ Konji

Buyeo Gonji (? – July, 477) was a member of the royal family of Baekje, one of the Three Kingdoms of Korea. He was a son of the 21st king, Gaero of Baekje and younger brother of the 22nd king, Munju of Baekje.

== Life ==
According to the Samguk Sagi he is son of Gaero and younger brother of Munju. According to the Chinese Book of Song he is the younger brother of Gaero. Then to complicate matters the Japanese Nihon Shoki calls him the son of the 20th king, Biyu of Baekje.

In 458 Gonji is sent to the Liu Song dynasty of China on the recommendation of his father.

In 461 he was dispatched as an envoy and hostage to Yamato period Japan together with his wife (or step-mother) from Baekje. The Nihon Shoki says his son Dongseong of Baekje is the child of a Japanese woman. He stayed for about 15 years in Kasai (關西) and Kawachi Province (河內).

In 475 Goguryeo invaded Baekje and King Gaero was killed. In 477 when his brother King Munju left the city from Hansung to Woongjin, Gonji returned to Baekje and took over protection of the crown prince, Samgeun but he died suddenly in July of that year. The cause of death was not recorded in the Samguk Sagi or Samguk Yusa.

According to another narrative, Gongji is the brother of King Gaeru, and Gaeru gave his pregnant wife to Gongji, and that son that Gongji had when he arrived in Japan with her became King Muryeong of Baekje. There is also a claim that Gonji became Emperor Keitai in Japan.

In Japan, Asukabe Shrine was built in the Habikino-Yasuka Village of Habikino City (Osaka) to enshrine Gonji and he is worshiped as a patron and ancestor of the village of Asuka. According to stories, there were other offspring to Gongji besides Muryeong and Dongseong, and these descendants settled in the village of Habikinoyasuka.

== Family ==
According to the Shinsen Shōjiroku, Gongji had five sons, Muryeong was the first son and Dongseong was the second son. It also says that their mother was different. According to Japanese records, the later rulers of Aichi and Asakusa were the grandchildren of Gonji.

- Father: Gaero of Baekje
- Mother: unknown
  - Brother: Buyeo Modo (扶餘牟都, ?–477) - 22nd King of Baekje, Munju of Baekje.
  - Wife(s): unknown (one is possibly a Japanese woman)
    - 1st son: Buyeo Sama/Buyeo Yung' (扶餘斯摩/扶餘隆, 462–523) - 25th King of Baekje, Muryeong of Baekje
    - 2nd son: Buyeo Modae' (扶餘牟大, ?–501) - 24th King of Baekje, Dongseong of Baekje
    - 3rd son: unknown
    - 4th son: unknown
    - 5th son: unknown

== See also ==
- History of Korea
- Three Kingdoms of Korea
