= Wideok of Baekje =

27th King of Baekje (r. 554–598)

- Hangul: 창
- Hanja: 昌
- RR: Chang
- MR: Ch'ang

Monarch name
- Hangul: 위덕왕
- Hanja: 威德王
- RR: Wideogwang
- MR: Widŏgwang

Wideok (525–598) was the 27th king of Baekje, one of the Three Kingdoms of Korea, reigning from 554 to 598. He was the eldest son of King Seong, succeeding him upon his death.

== Background ==
During Seong's reign, Baekje had led an alliance with the neighboring Silla and the Gaya confederacy to attack the powerful northern kingdom of Goguryeo. In 551, Baekje successfully reclaimed from Goguryeo the present-day Seoul region, which was Baekje's capital from its founding until 475. However, Silla betrayed the alliance and, under a secret agreement with Goguryeo, claimed the territory for itself.

As crown prince, Wideok organized the reprisal attack on Silla, despite opposition by the aristocracy. He participated in the Battle of Gwansanseong, in which his father and nearly 30,000 men died fighting the Silla army. That disastrous campaign led to the aristocracy of Baekje taking some power away from the kings.

== Reign ==
Baekje under Wideok was inimical with both Silla and Goguryeo, launching various battles and border incursions against the rival kingdoms.

To avoid isolation, and to strengthen the royal position against the power of the aristocracy, he maintained friendly relations with the Chinese dynasties of Chen, Northern Qi and Sui. Although ties had been largely broken following the cataclysmic events of the 550s, he sent missions to the Chen court in 567, 577, 584, and 586 (it fell to Sui shortly thereafter). In 567, he sent Baekje's first mission to Northern Qi; this may have been facilitated by an improved relationship with Goguryeo. In 570, the Northern Qi granted him titles including "Duke of Daifang commandery", and he sent another tribute mission in 572. After Northern Qi was conquered by Northern Zhou in 577, Baekje also sent a congratulatory mission including musicians to the Zhou court. The following year, a second and final embassy was sent to Northern Zhou, which was replaced by Sui in 581.

Wideok sent an immediate congratulatory mission to the Sui court in 581, and another in 582. In 589 Sui conquered Chen and united China. In the same year, a Sui warship happened to run aground on Jeju Island, which was ruled by the Baekje dependency of Tamna. Wideok provided the crew with an official escort (bearing tribute and congratulations) to the Chinese court. In 598 he sent an embassy offering to assist in the Sui expedition against Goguryeo that year. The expedition, however, had already been completed. Yeongyang of Goguryeo launched punitive attacks on Baekje's northern border when he learned of this.

Continuing the legacy of his father, Wideok sent various Buddhist missions to Yamato period Japan.

== Relics ==
In 1995, a stone relic box was found in a Baekje-era Buddhist temple in Buyeo County, South Chungcheong Province. Inscriptions on its face say it was made in 567 under Wideok's order. In 1996, the South Korean government designated the box as South Korean national treasure No. 288. It is held by the Buyeo National Museum.

== Family ==
- Father: Seong of Baekje
- Mother: unknown
- Brother: Buyeo Gye (扶餘季, 527–599) – 28th King of Baekje, Hye of Baekje.
- Sister: Lady Sobi (比召, ?–?) – consort of the 24th King of Silla, Jinheung of Silla.
- Brother: name unknown (?–?) – father of Mokuto-Ō known in Baekje as "Mokdo-wang" (目圖王/目図王), ancestor of the Gwisil clan and Oka no muraji clan (岡連氏). He settled in Japan.
- Queen: name unknown, from the Soo clan (召氏).
  - 1st son: Ajwa-Taeja (아좌태자; 阿佐太子, 572–645) – left to Japan in 597 where he was called "Asa-Taishi" and painted a portrait of Prince Shōtoku.
  - 2nd son: unknown
  - 3rd son: Imseong-Taeja (임성태자; 琳聖太子, 577–657) – he left to Japan in 611 where he was called "Rinshō-taishi" and became ancestor of the Ōuchi clan (大内氏).
- Concubine: Yeon Gamo, from the Yeon clan (延氏).
  - 4th son: Buyeo Jang/Buyeo Seodong (扶餘璋 / 扶餘薯童, 580–641) – 30th King of Baekje, Mu of Baekje. (disputed)

== In popular culture ==
- Portrayed by Jung Wook in the 2005–06 SBS TV series Ballad of Seodong.
- Portrayed by Kim Min-jun in the 2016–17 KBS2 TV series Hwarang: The Poet Warrior Youth.

== See also ==
- Rulers of Korea
- History of Korea
- Three Kingdoms of Korea
- List of Monarchs of Korea

Wideok of Baekje House of Buyeo Cadet branch of the House of Go Born: 525 Died: 598
Regnal titles
| Preceded by Seong | King of Baekje; 554–598 | Succeeded by Hye |
