= Asin of Paekche =

17th King of Paekche (r. 392–405)

Asin
- Eoraha

King of Paekche
- Reign: November 392 – September 405
- Coronation: November 392
- Predecessor: Jinsa
- Successor: Jeonji
- Born: Buyeo Asin; Unknown; Biyeorgung, Wiryeseong
- Died: September 405
- Consort: Lady Hae
- Issue: Buyeo Sinji; Buyeo Yang; Buyeo Sin
Regnal name
- Asin Eoraha; Abang Eoraha; Ahwa Eoraha; Ami Eoraha
- House: Buyeo
- Dynasty: Paekche
- Father: Chimnyu
- Mother: Lady Jin
- Religion: Buddhism
- Occupation: King

Korean name
- Hangul: 아신왕, 아방왕, 아화왕
- Hanja: 阿莘王, 阿芳王, 阿花王
- RR: Asinwang, Abangwang, Ahwawang
- MR: Asinwang, Abangwang, Ahwawang

King Asin (died 405) (r. 392–405) was the seventeenth king of Paekche, one of the Three Kingdoms of Korea.

== Background ==
Buyeo Abang was the eldest son of Paekche's 15th ruler Chimnyu, and ascended to the throne after the death of Chimnyu's brother, the 16th king Jinsa, of whom he is said to have killed.

== Reign ==
During his reign, Goguryeo forces under Gwanggaeto the Great of Goguryeo steadily pushed into Paekche from the north. Asin appointed his maternal uncle Jin Mu as chief general and ordered him to attack Goguryeo repeatedly in the early 390s, but each attack was defeated. In 395, after a failed attack by Paekche, Goguryeo took Paekche's territory around today's northern Seoul.

Asin sought to strengthen Paekche's position against Goguryeo, sending his son Jeonji to the Wa kingdom of Japan as a ward to cement Paekche's alliance with that country in 397. In 398, according to the Samguk sagi, he constructed Ssanghyeon Castle to protect Paekche's remaining territory north of the Han River. In 399, during another round of conscription for the battles against Goguryeo, many peasants are said to have fled to Silla. In 403 he attacked Silla. Historical records do not show any contacts with China during Asin's rule.

== Death ==
Asin died during the year 405, and watched desperately as his once-powerful kingdom was falling slowly to its powerful northern neighbor Goguryeo. His three brothers would fight for the throne ending in all of their deaths and the crowning of Asin's son.

== Family ==
- Father: Chimnyu
- Mother: Queen, of the Jin clan (眞氏)
  - Brother: Buyeo Hunhae (扶餘訓解, ?–405) – was in Japan as a hostage where his children stayed and founded the Anko clan (雁高氏). Killed by his younger brother, Seolye, who tried to usurp the throne.
  - Brother: Buyeo Seolye (扶餘碟禮, ?–405) – was in Japan as a hostage. Killed his brother Seolye to usurp the throne but was himself killed by his nephew and the prime minister.
  - Half-brother: Buyeo Hong (扶餘洪, ?–407) – in 394 was appointed Minister of Internal Affairs (内臣佐平, Naesin-jwa'pyeong).
- Consorts and their redpective issue(s):
1. Queen, of the Hae clan (解氏)
  1. 1st son: Buyeo Yeong (扶餘映, ?–420) – crown prince 394, sent to Japan 397, 18th King of Paekche, Jeonji in 405.
  2. Daughter: Shinjedo (新齊都媛, ?–?), younger sister of King Jeonji who was sent to Emperor Ojin to wait on him along with 7 maids during the 39th year of Ōjin's reign. She was naturalized in Japan where they called her Shisetsuhime.
2. Unknown concubine
  1. 2nd son: Buyeo Sin (扶餘信, ?–429) – first appointed in February, 407 as Minister of the Interior (Naesin-jwa'pyeong, 内臣佐平) then elected in 408 as chief minister (Sang-jwa'pyeong, 上佐平) which he held through the reign of three kings.

== Popular culture ==
- Portrayed by Yang Ki Won in the 2007 MBC TV series The Legend.
- Portrayed by Park Jung-chul in the 2011–2012 KBS1 TV series Gwanggaeto, The Great Conqueror.
- Portrayed by Lee Seung Chan in the 2017 KBS TV series Chronicles of Korea.

== See also ==
- History of Korea
- List of Monarchs of Korea

Asin of Paekche House of Buyeo Cadet branch of the House of Go Died: 405
Regnal titles
| Preceded by Jinsa | King of Baekje; 392–405 | Succeeded by Jeonji |
