= Jin clan =

Ancient Korean noble clan

Jin clan 眞
- Parent house: unknown
- Titles: Various
- Founder: unknown
- Founding year: unknown

The Jin clan (眞氏) was a powerful noble clan of Baekje, one of the Three Kingdoms of Korea.

== Baekje ==
They were one of the "Great Eight Families" (Daeseongpaljok, 大姓八族) of Baekje: (Sa (沙氏), Yeon (燕氏), Hyeop (劦氏), Hae (解氏), Jin (眞氏), Guk (國氏), Mok (木氏), and Baek (苩氏)). For generations the Jin monopolized providing queens for the Royal Family along with their rival, the Hae clan. This helped them gain high court positions in the government and military. The character (眞) means "real, actual, true, genuine".

After the Battle at Mt. Amak fortress (阿莫山城) against Silla during the beginning of the reign of King Mu of Baekje the Great Eight Families lost a great deal of power. Among the families the Hae clan (who had led the battle), Hyeop, Jin and Mok disappeared from the central political stage leaving only the Yeon, Guk and Baek clans. The Sa clan promoted their influence by military force and produced a queen in the late reign of Mu of Baekje.

They did not lose their status as central nobles during the reign of the last King, Uija of Baekje by colluding with royal authority. The Buyeo clan (the royal family, 扶餘氏) acquired influence with the collapse of the Great Eight Families. After King Uija acceded the throne, royal might was also divided and the lineal descendant of the royal clan with the king as its center was in control of political situation. Among the Great Eight Families, Yeon and Baek clans fell behind and only clans of Sa and Guk maintained their status as central nobles. In the late Baekje all the Great Eight Families except for Sa and Guk clans lost their status as the central nobles and were degraded to local influence at last.

In Yamato period Japan the members of the royal family were called "Mahito" (眞人, 真人) also read as "Jin person" and many scholars believe this implies a connection with the Jin clan of Baekje and the Imperial Line of Japan.

== Known Members ==
The records of the Jin clan are sparse and broken making it hard to create a family tree but can be viewed as a timeline.

- 2nd King: Daru of Baekje
  - 38: Jin Hwe (眞會) of "North-bu" (northern district) was appointed Marshal Bulwark of the Right. He is the first recorded person from the clan.
- 5th King: Chogo of Baekje
  - 214: Jin Gwa (眞果) of "North-bu" (northern district) is ordered to attack a Mal-gal castle. He led 1,000 soldiers to attack and take the Mohe castle of Seokmun.
- 8th King: Goi of Baekje
  - 240: Jin Chung (眞忠) is appointed "Jwa'jang" (Commanding General) and entrusted with military affairs.
  - 247: Jin Mul (眞勿) is appointed "Jwa'jang" (Commanding General) and entrusted with military affairs.
  - 261: Jin Ga (眞可) is appointed Finance Minister (Minister of the Treasury).
- 11th King: Biryu of Baekje
  - Queen: name unknown but is from the Jin clan.
  - 331: Jin Yi (眞義) is appointed Prime Minister and Minister of the Interior.
- 13th King: Geunchogo of Baekje
  - Queen: name unknown but is from the Jin clan.
  - 347: Jin Jeong (眞淨) is appointed Minister of Justice and is recorded as a "relative of the Queen".
- 14th King: Geungusu of Baekje
  - Queen: Lady Ai (阿尒夫人), daughter of Jin Godo who was a General for his father.
  - 376: Jin Godo (眞高道) who is a General and the king's father-in-law is appointed Prime Minister.
- 15th King: Chimnyu of Baekje
  - Queen: name unknown but is from the Jin clan. She was sister of the Prime Minister Jin Mu (眞武) who also served the next king.
  - 390: Jin Gamo (眞嘉謨) is ordered to attack Goguryeo and captured To-kon-seong and 200 prisoners. He was appointed Jwa'pyeong in charge of military affairs.
- 17th King: Asin of Baekje
  - 393: Jin Mu (眞武) was appointed "Jwa'jang" (Commanding General) and entrusted with military affairs. He was the King's maternal uncle. Attacked Goguryeo in 393 and 395, died 407.
- 18th King: Jeonji of Baekje
  - Queen: Lady Palsu (八須夫人) is from the Jin clan.
- 23rd King: Samgeun of Baekje
  - 478: Jin Nam (眞男) who was a General was sent with 2,000 men to capture Daedu Castle from the rebels Yeon Sin and Hae Gu but he failed.
  - 478: Jin Ro (眞老) who was a General was sent after Jin Nam's failure with 500 men and defeated the rebels. Yeon Sin fled to Goguryeo and the Jin clan gained strength.
- 24th King: Dongseong of Baekje
  - Concubine: name unknown is from the Jin clan.
  - 479–497: Jin Ro (眞老) served as "Byeonggwanjwapyeong" (兵官佐平) until his death in 497.
- Other Jin clan members:
- Jin Gong (眞功) was Prime Minister for the King Sinmun of Silla (r. 681-692).
- Jin Bok (眞福) was an opponent of the King Sinmun of Silla (r. 681-692).
- Jin Ho (眞虎), was Prime Minister of Later Baekje ("Hubaekje").

== See also ==
- Hae clan
- Baekje
- Geungusu of Baekje
- Chimnyu of Baekje
- Jinsa of Baekje
- Asin of Baekje
- Baekje Government
