= Mu of Baekje =

30th King of Baekje (r. 600–641)

King Mu
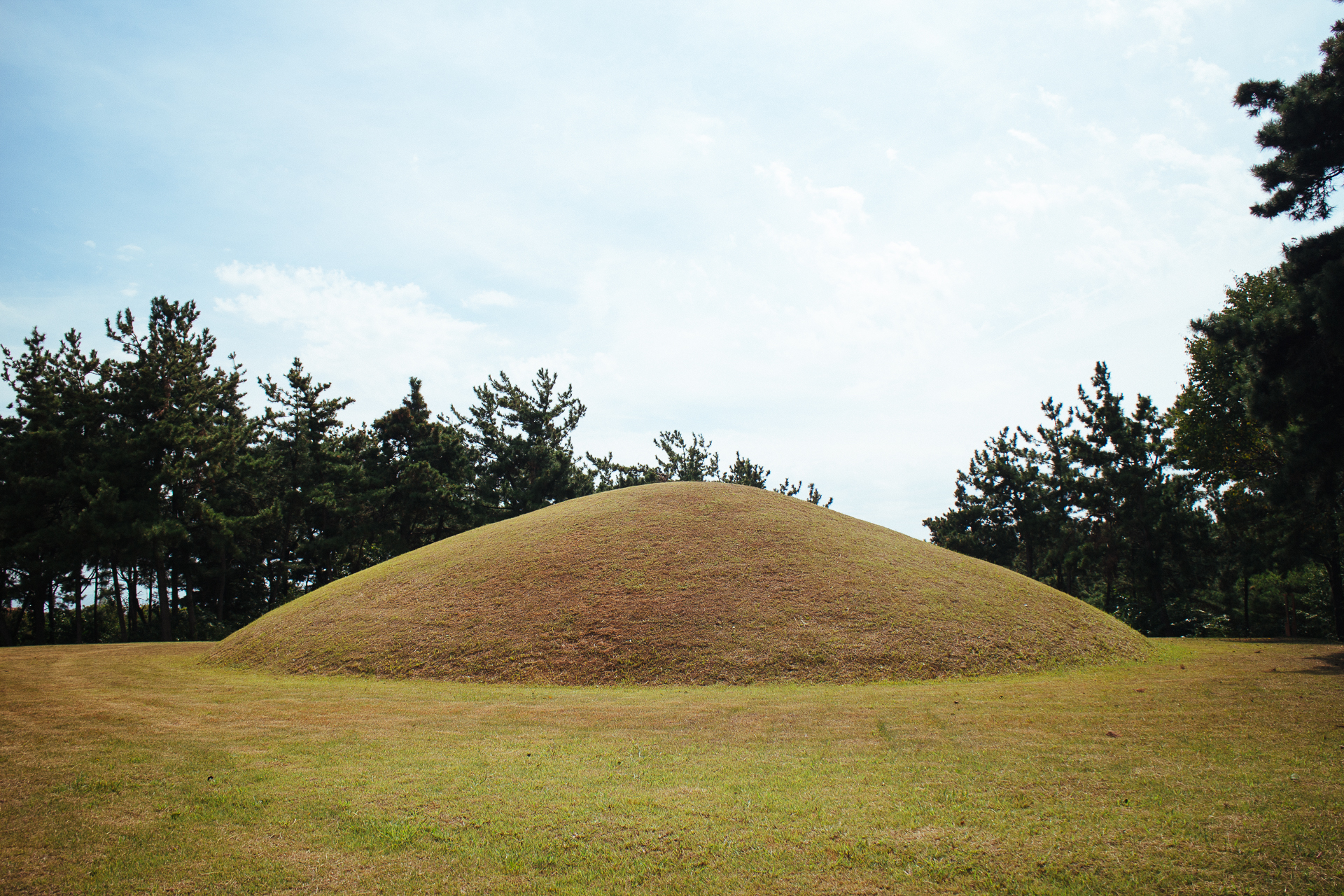
- King Mu's tomb

King of Baekje
- Reign: 600–641
- Coronation: 600
- Predecessor: Beop of Baekje
- Successor: Uija of Baekje
- Born: not known Baekje
- Died: 641; Baekje
- Burial: Iksan Ssangreung
Posthumous name
- King Mu (武王, 무왕)
- Father: Wideok of Baekje or Beop
- Mother: unknown

Korean name
- Hangul: 장; 무강; 헌병
- Hanja: 璋; 武康; 獻丙
- RR: Jang; Mugang; Heonbyeong
- MR: Chang; Mugang; Hŏnbyŏng

Monarch name
- Hangul: 무왕
- Hanja: 武王
- RR: Muwang
- MR: Muwang

Childhood name
- Hangul: 서동
- Hanja: 薯童
- RR: Seodong
- MR: Sŏdong

Mu (?–641) was the 30th king of Baekje, one of the Three Kingdoms of Korea, reigning from 600 to 641. He was either the 4th son of King Wideok or the son of Beop.

== Background ==
During his reign, the Three Kingdoms (Goguryeo, Baekje, and Silla) were at war with each other, as alliances shifted and the neighboring China also experienced a change of dynasties.

Because reliable historical sources are hard to find for the Three Kingdoms period, the specifics of Mu's policies are not known.

== Reign ==
Early in his reign, Mu attacked Silla several times. He also requested assistance from the Sui dynasty of China to attack Goguryeo. Following the Goguryeo–Sui War, the Sui was replaced by the Tang dynasty in China in 618.

In 627, he attempted to recover land lost to Silla, but stopped when Tang intervened diplomatically. The same year, he sent the Buddhist monk Gwalleuk to Japan with texts on Buddhism, astronomy, history, and geography.

He formally established the Mireuksa temple in 602. He is also said to have ordered the repair of Baekje's Sabi Palace in 630, and the construction near his palace of the earliest known artificial lake in Korea. His policies in the latter half of his reign, which emphasized construction projects at the expense of national defence, are often thought to have contributed to the fall of Baekje, which took place twenty years after his death.

There is reason to believe that he moved the capital of Baekje from Sabi in Buyeo County to Iksan, at least briefly. Archaeological evidence in Iksan, including tombs attributed to Mu and his wife appears to confirm this.

Mu retained close ties with Tang China, but Tang later allied with Silla in the wars that ultimately unified the Korean Peninsula under Silla's rule by 668.

== Legend of Seodong ==
The Samguk yusa relates a legend regarding Mu's marriage to a princess of Silla, although historians consider it unlikely to be true, given the hostilities between the rival kingdoms. In this story, the young Seodong (Mu's childhood name) falls in love with Silla princess Seonhwa, and intentionally spreads a song about the princess and himself among the people. Thanks to this song ("Seodong-yo," or "Seodong's Song"), King Jinpyeong of Silla banishes the princess, and Mu marries her and becomes the king of Baekje.

== Discovery of remains ==
Analysis of the human bones found in the twin tombs showed that King Mu died around the age of 60, his height was between 5 feet 3 inches and 5 feet 7 inches (161-170.1 cm), and his year of death is estimated to be between 620 and 659. This would speculate that he was born around 581. Historians were not able to identify whether the queen found in the same twin tombs was Seonhwa or Sataek, thus could not prove the legend of Seonhwa. Moreso, as in 2009, excavations at Mireuksa discovered relics with inscriptions of Queen Sataek's name. Further investigations were conducted on the smaller chamber to identify the buried, but was unsuccessful, thus scholars were unable to resolve the case and tell whether the queen buried with Mu was Seonhwa, Sataek or someone else.

== Family ==
- Father: Wideok of Baekje or Beop
- Mother: Yeon Gamo
  - Brother: Jin'ni-Ō (辰爾王, ?–?) – settled in Japan and became ancestor of the Ōuchi clan and Toyota clan.
  - Queen: Queen Sataek (沙宅王后, d. 642/55) – daughter of Minister Sataek Jeokdeok (沙宅積德).
    - 31st king, Uija of Baekje (義慈王, 599–660) – last king of Baekje, known as Buyeo Uija (扶餘義慈) before he became king.
  - Queen: Princess Seonhwa (선화공주; 善花公主, ?–?) – daughter of King Jinpyeong of Silla. (disputed, possibly a legend)
    - Buyeo Gyogi (扶餘翹岐, ?–?) – banished to Japan in 642.

== In popular culture ==
- Portrayed by Choi Jung-hoon in the 1992-1993 KBS TV series The Three Kingdoms.
- Portrayed by Kim Seok and Jo Hyun-jae in the 2005-2006 SBS TV series Ballad of Seodong.
- Portrayed by Choi Jong-hwan in the 2011 MBC TV series Gyebaek.
- Portrayed by Park Chul-ho in the 2012-2013 KBS1 TV series Dream of the Emperor.

== See also ==
- History of Korea
- Three Kingdoms of Korea
- List of monarchs of Korea

Mu of Baekje House of Buyeo Cadet branch of the House of Go Born: ? Died: 641
Regnal titles
| Preceded by Beop | King of Baekje; 600–641 | Succeeded by Uija |
