= Sword & Silence =

2026 South Korean television series

- Promotional poster
- Also known as: Great King Munmu
- Hangul: 문무
- Hanja: 文武
- RR: Munmu
- MR: Munmu
- Genre: Historical drama
- Written by: Kim Ri-heon; Hong Jin-yi
- Directed by: Kim Young-jo; Koo Sung-joon
- Starring: Lee Hyun-wook; Jang Hyuk; Park Sung-woong; Kim Kang-woo; Jo Sung-ha
- Country of origin: South Korea
- Original language: Korean
- No. of episodes: 4

Production
- Producers: Kim Min-jun; Choi Yun-seok
- Running time: 70 minutes
- Production companies: KeyEast; Monster Union
- Budget: ₩30 billion

Original release
- Network: KBS2
- Release: November 14, 2026 – present

Sword & Silence (Korean: 문무) is an ongoing South Korean historical drama television series written by Kim Ri-heon and Hong Jin-yi, directed by Kim Young-jo and Koo Sung-joon, and starring Lee Hyun-wook, Jang Hyuk, Park Sung-woong, Kim Kang-woo, Jung Woong-in, and Jo Sung-ha. The series follows King Munmu of Silla as he navigates devastating warfare, political turmoil, and formidable rivals like Yeon Gaesomun to achieve the historic unification of the Korean Peninsula. It premiered on KBS2 on November 14, 2026, and airs every Saturday and Sunday at 21:20 (KST).

== Synopsis ==
Set during the volatile 7th-century Three Kingdoms period of Korea, the story depicts the geopolitical power struggles and territorial conflicts between Goguryeo, Paekche, and Silla. Kim Beop-min, later King Munmu of Silla, grapples with the heavy burdens of leadership, warfare, and statecraft. Backed by military commander Kim Yu-sin and influenced by his father, Kim Chun-chu, Beop-min seeks to unify the peninsula amidst relentless threats from rival leaders, notably Goguryeo's military dictator Yeon Gaesomun.

== Cast and characters ==
=== Main ===
- Lee Hyun-wook as Kim Beop-min / King Munmu

Initially living a detached life disillusioned by warfare and politics, Beop-min is thrust into the political and military forefront following the devastating fall of Daeyaseong Fortress to Paekche. Possessing strong pride and deep restraint, he transforms from a reluctant royal into a powerful warrior, strategist, and monarch dedicated to the survival and eventual unification of Silla.

- Jang Hyuk as Yŏn Kaesomun

The military dictator of Goguryeo. Born into a powerful military lineage, Yeon Gaesomun is viewed by some as a brilliant military hero, and by others as a ruthless tyrant. After preemptively thwarting an assassination plot by rival aristocrats and King Bojang through a violent purge, he consolidates absolute control over Goguryeo's military and political power.

- Kim Kang-woo as Kim Chun-chu / King Taejong Muyeol

A charismatic and politically adept figure who uses eloquence and diplomacy to advance his agenda across Goguryeo, Tang dynasty, and Japan. Beneath a charming exterior lies fierce ambition, meticulous self-restraint, and a cold calculation that he conceals even from his closest allies.

- Park Sung-woong as Kim Yu-sin

A renowned military commander who serves as a living legend and symbol of Silla's armed forces. Known for his unflinching bravery—exemplified by his willingness to confront the commander of the invading Tang army—he carries the heavy and lonely burden of a national hero as he fulfills his military destiny.

=== Supporting ===
Silla

- Jung Woong-in as Kim Jin-ju

A jingol (true-bone) aristocrat and military general who commands a large private army. A pragmatist and influential hidden power within the Silla court, he strategically navigates court politics by aligning himself with whichever faction holds the advantage.

- Kim Do-hyun as Seol Oh-yu

A skilled and courageous military officer in the Silla army whose career is hindered by his low duput (sixth rank) provincial background and his father's historical surrender to Tang. Despite having his military achievements repeatedly co-opted by the jingol aristocracy, he remains a defiant figure who actively challenges the corruption and rigid stratification of Silla's bone-rank system.

- Oh Seung-hoon as Kim In-mun

Chun-chu's second son and Beop-min's younger brother. He embodies a balance of his father's strategic patience and his brother's fierce courage.

- Lee Ji-hoon as Pidam

An elite aristocrat situated at the center of Silla's power. Possessing striking charisma and vast wealth—derived from commercial ventures, taverns, and moneylending operations across the capital of Seorabol—he leverages his economic influence to expand his political standing.

- Han Ga-ram as Queen Jaui

Beop-min's wife and Seon-pum's daughter, a prominent Hwabaek Council member who holds dominant control over Silla's maritime shipping trade.

- Lee Hyeon-geol as Simna

A man of immense physical strength and a fiery, unpretentious personality. Serving alongside his son Sona in Seol Oh-yu's elite axe-wielding unit, he shares a close bond with both commander and son through the trials of war.

- Lee Woo-je as Sona

Simna's son, endowed with similar monstrous physical strength. Despite a playful and teasing dynamic with his father, he is deeply devoted to him and ultimately perishes in battle at Adaseong Fortress.

- Jang Yeon-woo as Sideuk

A military commander born into a long-standing influential family in Dangseong, formerly Paekche territory. Despite his prominent lineage, he faces social discrimination in Silla's capital of Seorabol due to his provincial background and duput status. Nevertheless, he is an expert naval commander with extensive knowledge of the Yellow Sea's coastal waters and tidal flats.

Goguryeo

- Jo Sung-ha as Go Geon-mu / King Yeongnyu

A legendary military figure whose tactical achievements in the conflicts between Goguryeo and the Sui dynasty have drawn comparisons to Eulji Mundeok. Despite saving countless lives and achieving an unmatched record of military victories, he harbors a profound hatred for warfare.

- Baek Sung-hyun as Go Yeon-mu

A steadfast and principled soldier who survives the fall of Goguryeo. Defined by a tragic destiny, he ultimately aligns with former adversaries in order to ensure the survival of his people.

- Lee Ik-joon as Yŏn Jeongto

Gaesomun's younger brother. A rugged and somewhat passive figure who remains fiercely loyal to his brother throughout his life, though he constantly falls short of Gaesomun's capabilities. Unlike Yŏn Namsaeng, he adamantly refuses to surrender to Tang dynasty, but ultimately defects to Silla following the fall of Goguryeo after being persuaded by Kim Beop-min.

- Kim Aaron as Yŏn Namsaeng

Gaesomun's eldest son. Characterized by an outgoing and cheerful disposition, though his impulsive and impatient nature often leads him to act hastily.

Paekche

- Go Young-bin as King Uija

A political figure who struggles with deep-seated trauma and insecurities stemming from his mother's ambiguous social background and the stigma of his 'Silla descent'. Despite his exceptional political acumen, he faces constant opposition and marginalization from the aristocracy and the Sataek-led royal relatives.

- Im Ho as Seongchung

A shrewd and principled strategist who initially stands by King Uija as an ally against the ruling aristocracy. Driven by his unyielding moral integrity, he continues to offer frank counsel to the king, ultimately leading to his imprisonment.

- Jeong Ui-gap as Sangyeong

A capable military commander who leads Paekche's elite long-spear unit.

- Kim Woo-dam as Kyebaek

A legendary military commander of Paekche who meets a tragic and historic end. Completely devoid of political cunning or worldly pragmatism, he is nonetheless renowned for his peerless bravery and tactical prowess on the battlefield.

- Ahn Hong-jin as Bu Yeo-yung

King Uija's eldest son. Born to a mother from the powerful Sataek clan, he is stripped of his position as crown prince by the king during a political upheaval.

Tang Dynasty

- Yang Hyun-min as Lee Se-min / Emperor Taizong

A battle-tested military conqueror and ruthless political strategist. Driven by an unwavering ambition to conquer Goguryeo—a feat previously deemed impossible—he pursues the ultimate vision of unifying the peninsula.

- Park Myung-hoon as Xu Jingzong

An ambitious official of Tang dynasty who secures rapid political advancement through sycophancy toward Empress Wu. He actively schemes against and targets the life of In-mun.

- Choi Ye-bin as Empress Wu Zetian

The first female sovereign of the Tang dynasty. Beneath a captivating and mesmerizing facade lies a ruthless political strategist endowed with sharp intuition and unwavering ambition.

- Lee Ji-hoon as Xue Rengui

A renowned military general and celebrated war hero of the Tang dynasty. Recognized by his distinctive white armor and flamboyant presence, he treats the battlefield as a personal stage while commanding considerable military influence.

- Park Kang-sub as Li Zhi / Emperor Gaozing

The third emperor of the Tang dynasty and successor to Emperor Taizong. Throughout his reign, he struggles with chronic illness and persistent paranoia, navigating the immense shadow of his predecessor and his complex political dynamic with Empress Wu.

Others

- Bae Jung-hwa as Kim Munhui
- Sung Hyuk as Suse

== Production ==
=== Development ===
Kim Young-jo, known for his work such as Hwarang: The Poet Warrior Youth (2016–2017) and Jang Yeong-sil (2016), was attached to co-direct with Koo Sung-joon, and the screenplay is written by Kim Ri-heon and Hong Jin-yi. Produced by KeyEast and Monster Union, the series consists of 28 episodes and has a production cost of approximately ₩30 billion. The first script reading was held on September 24, 2025.

=== Casting ===
In September 2025, Lee Hyun-wook, Jang Hyuk, Park Sung-woong, and Kim Kang-woo were considering. By November 2025, Lee, Jang, Park, Kim, Jung Woong-in and Jo Sung-ha were officially confirmed to lead the series.

=== Filming ===
Principal photography was initially scheduled to begin in November 2025, but was moved to the next month, with location filming in Mongolia. According to the KBS newsletter on February 9, 2026, the production had already concluded filming in Mongolia and commenced filming in South Korea in late January. On April 18, it was announced that the crew had departed for Mongolia to film the Battle of Mount Jupil.

== Release ==
Sword & Silence was scheduled to premiere on KBS2 in the second half of 2026. In February 2026, the series was reportedly slated to air in November 2026. It was later confirmed to premiere on November 14, 2026, and would air every Saturday and Sunday at 21:20 (KST). Ahead of its premiere, KBS2 aired a two-part promotional preview titled Sword & Silence Special on November 7 and 8, featuring cast interviews, production background, and commentary from historical experts to introduce the series' historical context.

== Viewership ==
Sword & Silence : South Korea viewers per episode (thousands)

Season	Episode number																												Average
Season	1	2	3	4	5	6	7	8	9	10	11	12	13	14	15	16	17	18	19	20	21	22	23	24	25	26	27	28	Average
1	937	806	747	TBD	TBD	TBD	TBD	TBD	TBD	TBD	TBD	TBD	TBD	TBD	TBD	TBD	TBD	TBD	TBD	TBD	TBD	TBD	TBD	TBD	TBD	TBD	TBD	TBD	TBD

Source: Audience measurement performed nationwide by Nielsen Korea.

Average TV viewership ratings
Ep.	Original broadcast date	Average audience share (Nielsen Korea)	
Ep.	Original broadcast date	Nationwide	Seoul
1	November 14, 2026	4.7% (7th)	4.6% (6th)
2	November 15, 2026	4.2% (8th)	3.7% (10th)
3	November 21, 2026	4.0% (9th)	3.6% (8th)
4	November 22, 2026		
5	November 28, 2026		
6	November 29, 2026		
7	December 5, 2026		
8	December 6, 2026		
9	December 12, 2026		
10	December 13, 2026		
11	December 19, 2026		
12	December 20, 2026		
13	December 26, 2026		
14	December 27, 2026		
15	January 2, 2027		
16	January 3, 2027		
17	January 9, 2027		
18	January 10, 2027		
19	January 16, 2027		
20	January 17, 2027		
21	January 23, 2027		
22	January 24, 2027		
23	January 30, 2027		
24	January 31, 2027		
25	February 6, 2027		
26	February 7, 2027		
27	February 13, 2027		
28	February 14, 2027		
Average		—	—
In the table above, the blue numbers represent the lowest ratings and the red numbers represent the highest ratings.
