= Queen Seondeok of Silla =

Monarch of Silla from 632 to 647

Queen Seondeok 선덕왕 善德王
- Rock-carved Seated Buddha in Bulgok Valley of Namsan Mountain, Gyeongju, also known as Grandmother Buddha (할매부처), was claimed that Queen Seondeok was the model for this statue by Professor Kim Ki-heung (김기흥).

Queen of Silla
- Reign: 632–647 (15 years)
- Coronation: 632
- Predecessor: Jinpyeong of Silla
- Successor: Jindeok of Silla
- Born: Unknown
- Died: 20 February [O.S. 17 February] 647; 8th day of the 1st lunar month of the 14th year of Inpyeong 仁平14年正月8日 (인평14년 정월 8일); Silla
- Burial: Seondeogyeowangneung, Gyeongju, South Korea
Posthumous name
- Queen Seondeok (善德王, 선덕왕)
Temple name
- Seongjo (聖祖, 성조)
- Father: Jinpyeong of Silla
- Mother: Queen Maya of Silla

- Queen Seondeok of Silla
- Hangul: 선덕여왕; 선덕왕
- Hanja: 善德女王; 善德王
- RR: Seondeok yeowang; Seondeogwang
- MR: Sŏndŏk yŏwang; Sŏndŏgwang

Queen Seondeok (Korean: 선덕여왕 Korean pronunciation: [sʌn.dʌk jʌ.waŋ]; Unknown – 20 February [O.S. 17 February] 647; 8th day of the 1st lunar month of the 14th year of Inpyeong [인평 14년 정월 8일; 仁平14年正月8日]) reigned as Queen Regnant of Silla, one of the Three Kingdoms of Korea, from 632 to 647. She was Silla's twenty-seventh ruler, and its first reigning queen. In the Samguk sagi, Queen Seondeok was described as "generous, benevolent, wise, and smart". According to the Legend of Jigwi, she was also beautiful.

== Titles ==
In texts, Queen Seondeok is indicated not only as Seondeok yeowang (선덕여왕; 善德女王), but also as Seondeok wang (선덕왕; 善德王), Seondeok yeodaewang (선덕여대왕; 善德女大王) and Seongjohwanggo (성조황고; 聖祖皇姑).

- Yeowang (여왕; 女王; lit. 'female king') – Yeowang ("female king") is the title of queen regnant in Korean. (Note: East Asian royal titles are all related. For example, a queen regnant is called nǚwáng in Chinese, yeowang in Korean, Nữ vương in Vietnamese, and joō in Japanese, but these are all just their respective pronunciations of the Chinese character 女王 ("female king").) Because there is no feminine equivalent to king and emperor in East Asian languages, different titles are used for female monarchs and female consorts.
- Wang (왕; 王; lit. 'king') – Unlike European languages, in East Asia, the titles of female monarchs can also be abbreviated as "king" or "emperor", much like their male counterparts. However, to avoid confusion with male monarchs, they are usually referred to as "female king" or "female emperor".
- Yeodaewang (여대왕; 女大王; lit. 'female great king') – It is a combination of yeowang ("female king") and daewang (대왕; 大王; lit. 'great king'). In the Samguk yusa, she is also called Seondeok yeodaewang (선덕여대왕), meaning Great Queen (Regnant) Seondeok.
- Seongjohwanggo (성조황고; 聖祖皇姑; lit. 'divine ancestors' emperor-woman') – The title given to Queen Seondeok when she ascended the throne was Seongjohwanggo (聖祖皇姑). It means Empress descended from divine ancestors. This is one of the cases in which Silla used the title of emperor/empress as well as the title of king/queen. (See Emperor at home, king abroad for more information.)

== Succession to the throne ==
Born Princess Deokman (德曼), Seondeok was the daughter of King Jinpyeong and Queen Maya of Silla. She had two siblings, Princess Cheonmyeong and Princess Seonhwa (although Seonhwa's existence is controversial due to the discovery of evidence in 2009 that points to King Uija's mother as being Queen Sataek and not Seonhwa as indicated by historical records). It is uncertain whether she or Cheonmyeong was the first born. According to the disputed text Hwarang Segi, Cheonmyeong was older than Seondeok. According to the historical text Samguk sagi, Seondeok was the eldest daughter.

According to the disputed text Hwarang Segi, because King Jinpyeong had no son whom he could pass the crown to, he began to consider his son-in-law, Kim Yongsu (husband of Princess Cheonmyeong) as his successor - after recognizing his achievements for the country. When Princess Deokman heard of it, she made a plea to her father, asking him to give her a chance to compete for the throne, insisting that she too had the right to compete for the throne as much as Kim Yongsu had. Seeing her determination, the King gave her the chance to prove herself worthy of the throne. Although it was not unusual for women to wield power in Silla (Queen Sado also served as a regent for King Jinpyeong), the thought of having a female ruler sitting on the throne was still unacceptable for most of them. Therefore, Princess Deokman had to prove herself in order to gain the trust and support of her people. Eventually, she succeeded, and was named as King Jinpyeong's successor. But this story is not mentioned in the historical texts Samguk sagi and Samguk yusa. According to the Samguk yusa, the reason Seondeok became a female monarch was just because there was no male Seonggol of Bone-rank system.

The decision was not accepted by everyone, and as a result; some officials planned an uprising in order to stop her from being crowned. On May of 631, Ichan Chilsuk (이찬 칠숙) and Achan Seokpum (아찬 석품) planned a rebellion. But, their plan was discovered and suppressed early on. As punishment, Chilsuk was beheaded in the market place along with his entire family. Seokpum was able to escape and ran to the Baekje border. However, he missed his wife and decided to return after exchanging clothes with a woodcutter. Upon his return, he was arrested by soldiers waiting for him at his home, and was later executed.

== Reign ==
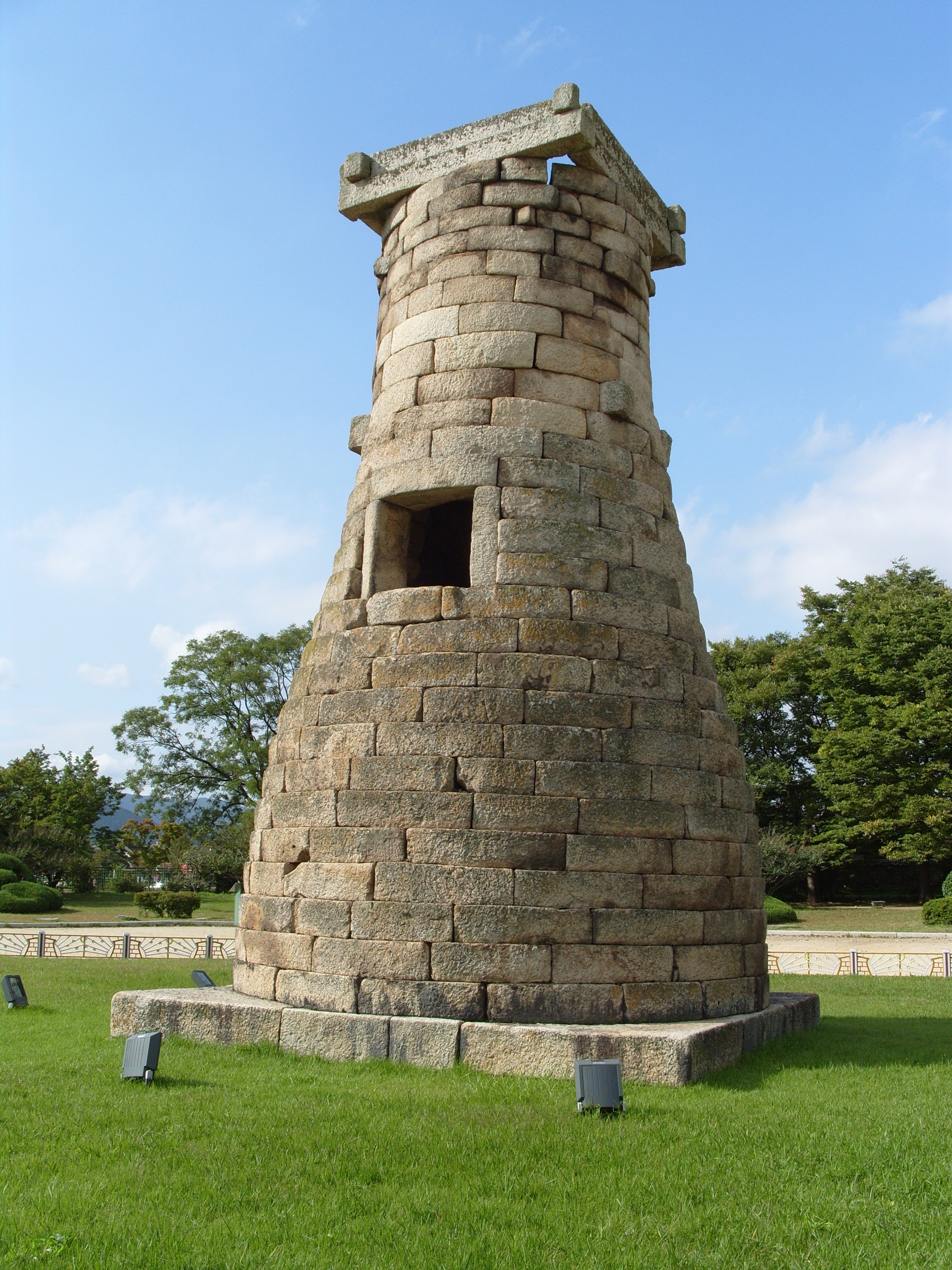
Cheomseongdae, astronomical observatory in Gyeongju, South Korea.

In January 632, Queen Seondeok became the first queen regnant of Silla. As a ruler, Queen Seondeok's primary concern was the livelihood of her people. Right after she was crowned, she appeased her people by telling them what her policies would be. She sent royal inspectors throughout the kingdom to improve the care of widows, widowers, orphans, the poor, and the elderly. During that same year, she sent a diplomat to pay tribute to the Emperor of the Tang dynasty of China, and inform him about Silla's new ruler. However, Emperor Taizong of Tang refused to acknowledge Seondeok as a ruler because she was a woman.

In the second year of Queen Seondeok's reign, Cheomseongdae, an astronomical observatory, was built to help the farmers. She also announced a whole year of tax exemption for the peasants and reduced the tax for the middle class, and through this act of kindness, the queen won the people's support and her position was strengthened against the opposition of the male aristocracy. In June of the same year, Queen Seondeok sent a diplomat to pay nominal tribute to the Tang Emperor again; however, Emperor Taizong still refused to acknowledge her as a ruler. Seondeok was unfazed, as Korean rulers of Korean dynasties have always seen themselves as equal to the rulers of Chinese dynasties.

According to the Samguk sagi, in March, 636, the queen became ill and no amount of prayers and medicine worked. In March, 638, a large stone on the south side of the mountain moved on its own, and seven months later, Goguryeo attacked the mountain valley. The next year, the sea water on the eastern part of the Silla kingdom turned red, which caused all of the fish living in it to die. These events made the people anxious, and some of them considered them as bad omens portending the Silla kingdom's downfall.

In 642, Uija of Baekje personally led a campaign against Silla, and conquered 40 fortresses in the western part of Silla. General Yunchung conquered the strategically important Daeya Fortress with 10,000 men and executed the daughter and son-in-law of Kim Chunchu. In 643, Baekje and Goguryeo conquered Danghang Fortress, blocking an important sea route to the Tang dynasty. Because of this, Queen Seondeok sent a diplomat to the Emperor of Tang and asked for assistance. The Emperor gave her three proposals. First, he would attack the Liaodong Peninsula and carry out a naval campaign on the west to occupy the Baekje. Second, the emperor would provide thousands of Tang uniforms and army flags in order to help Silla soldiers disguise themselves as Chinese troops. Third, he would send a male royal of Tang descent to serve as a new king of Silla, as, according to him, Silla faced constant threat because their enemies did not fear them due to their having a female ruler. The diplomat returned to Silla, unable to tell the Queen of the proposals that the Tang Emperor had offered.

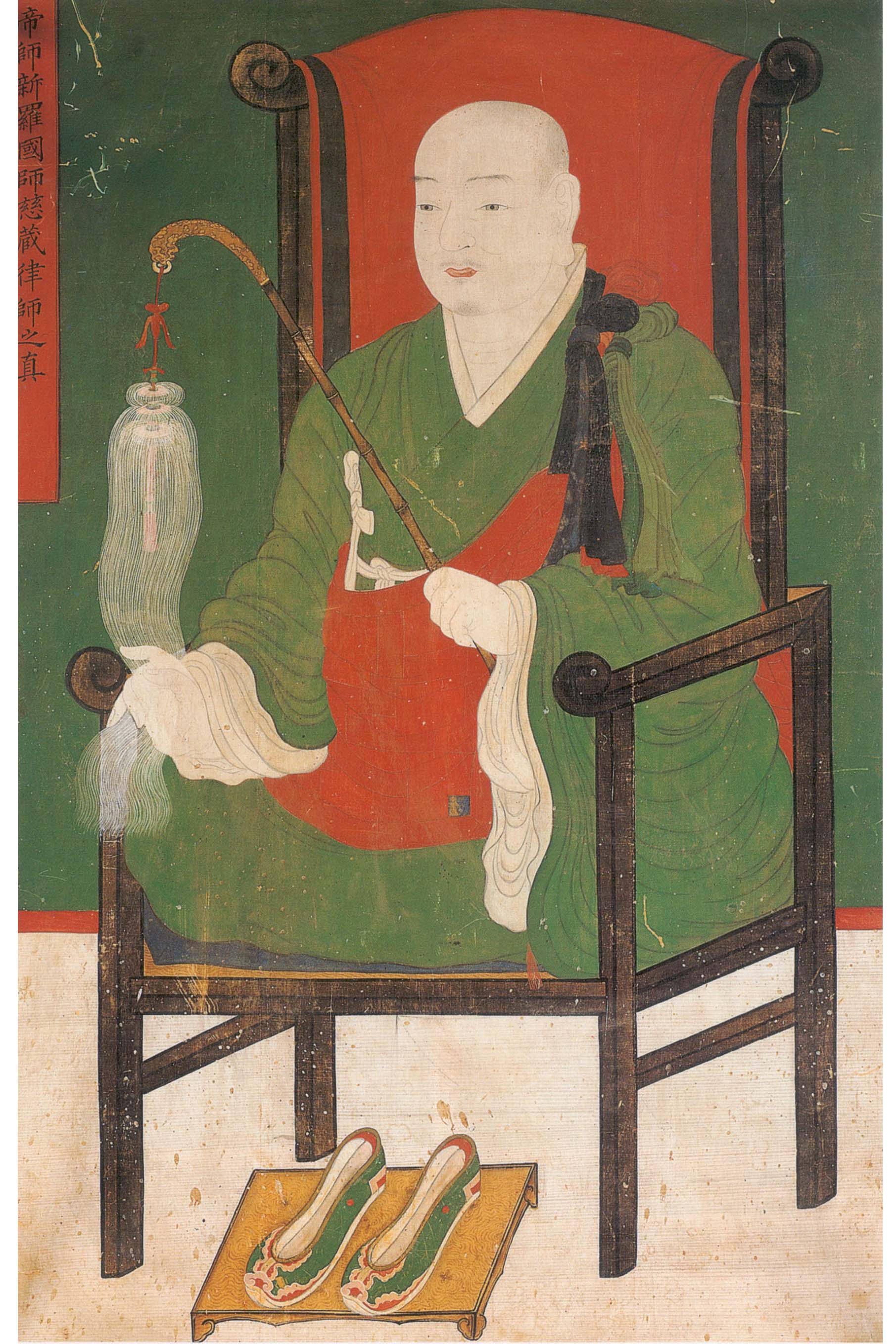
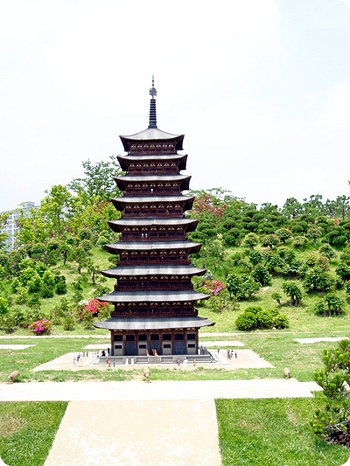
Left: Jajang, a monk born Kim Seonjong, into the royal Kim family, in the kingdom of Silla. Right: Hwangnyongsa, a miniature reconstruction of what the main pagoda may have once looked like.

At that point of crisis, Queen Seondeok sent for the well known Buddhist monk, Jajang, who had been studying under the great Buddhist masters of the Tang dynasty for seven years. Monk Jajang returned to Silla in 643. He advised the queen and her counselors to build the great nine-story pagoda for the dual purpose of blocking foreign invasions and calming her people. After careful consideration, the queen decided to accept Jajang's proposal, seeing it as necessary to overcome the crisis that they were facing at that time. However, during her meeting with her royal subjects, she learned that they were strongly against it due to concern for the state of the royal treasury, knowing that the construction of the pagoda would bring a heavy tax burden on her people. But the queen still decided to continue with the plan with the firm belief that a work of religious devotion would bring her people together and show her people that Silla was still far from ruin. She told her royal subjects to "tear down her palace and use its bricks and timbers, if they think they lack the funds". After two years, the pagoda was finally completed; it was called Hwangnyongsa (meaning "Imperial Dragon Temple") and was considered the tallest temple in East Asia at that time. During that same year, Queen Seondeok appointed a nobleman named Bidam to the highest position in the court (Sangdaedeung).

During the reign of Queen Seondeok, the first foundation for unifying the three Kingdoms under Silla was laid. A series of attacks and raids by the combined forces of Baekje and Goguryeo had brought the kingdom to a point of crisis. The queen decided to form an alliance with the Tang dynasty. She was ridiculed at first; however, after seeing the growing strength of Goguryeo, the Emperor of Tang, finally accepted her offer.

=== Bidam's rebellion ===
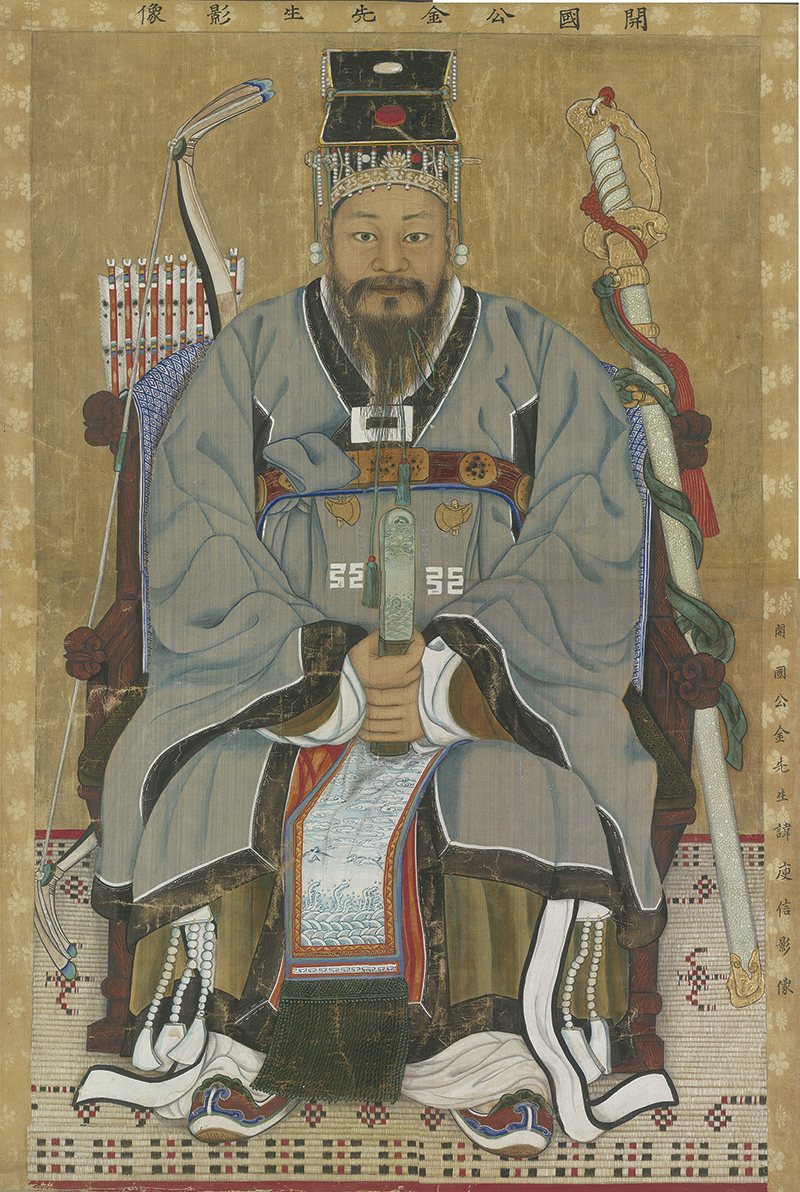
Portrait of Kim Yu-sin

On February 8, 647 (January 8, lunar calendar), Queen Seondeok faced her greatest challenge when several of her highest officials started a rebellion against her. They were led by Bidam, who asserted that: "The female king failed to rule the country, therefore women should stop ruling". Bidam had strong political influence in the court, and thus created the biggest rebellion in Silla's history. Since most of the army had been sent to different parts of the Silla kingdom to defend it from potential foreign invasions, the rebellion was a great threat.

According to a famous anecdote about Bidam's rebellion, on the night of Bidam's rebellion, Queen Seondeok's health had deteriorated sharply due to illness, and a star fell near the Queen's residence. Bidam, who saw the star, claimed it was a sign of the queen's impending downfall, to encourage his superstitious followers. The queen, who heard of the event, became fearful and anxious, but Kim Yushin calmed her by telling her not to worry, for he had a plan to suppress the rebellion. He then flew a huge kite with a burning scarecrow attached to it, to make it appear that the star was back in its place. Bidam's followers saw this, and became greatly discouraged.

The rebellion was eventually suppressed by Kim Yu-sin and Kim Alcheon. According to the Samguk sagi, Bidam and his thirty followers were executed on February 17, 647 (lunar calendar). The rebellion therefore lasted for fewer than 10 days, and failed in its goal to overthrow the government of Queen Seondeok.

=== Death ===
Queen Seondeok died on February 20, 647 (January 8, 647 in the lunar calendar) shortly before Bidam's rebellion was completely suppressed. There is no known record identifying the exact cause of her death, but Queen Seondeok was known to have had an unspecified illness shortly prior to her death, and this illness is most commonly theorized as the cause of her death. Some historians state it is also possible she died partly out of shock that Bidam had instigated a rebellion against her. Queen Seondeok was buried in a tomb on Nangsan, one of the sacred mountains in Gyeongju. After Queen Seondeok's death, her cousin was then named as the next female ruler of Silla, and became Queen Jindeok.

=== Buddhism and astrology ===
Like her father, Queen Seondeok was drawn to Buddhism. Silla built many temples, pagodas, and Buddha statues during her reign. One of the famous temples that was built during her time was the temple of Hwangnyongsa. According to ancient architectural records, the pagoda was 68 or 80 meters in height, making it one of the tallest structures in East Asia at the time. The pagoda represented the earnest wish of Queen Seondeok and the Silla people, to protect the country and bring the three kingdoms of Korea under one ruler. It was an offering to the Buddha, in hope that these wishes would be fulfilled. The queen often visited the Hwangnyongsa temple to pray for the wisdom and strength to save Silla from danger.

Bunhwangsa, Oseam, Sangwonsa, Yeongmyosa, Tongdosa, Woljeongsa, Baekdamsa, and Magoksa were built during her reign. She also built the "Star-Gazing Tower," or Cheomseongdae, considered the first dedicated observatory in the Far East, which helped farmers at that time. The tower still stands in the old Silla capital of Gyeongju, South Korea and is the oldest surviving observatory in East Asia.

== Legacy ==
She encouraged a renaissance in thought, literature, and the arts in Silla. She developed Buddhist culture, selected great talent, and established diplomacy with the Tang dynasty, laying the foundation for the unification of the Three Kingdoms of Korea.

However, there are also negative evaluations due to the military failure and the squandering of national power by the excessive construction of temples, and since Queen Seondeok's ascension to the throne itself was achieved through a compromise between two conflicting powers, no reforms that could even slightly affect the existing balance could be promoted during her reign. It was evaluated that the absence of any achievements related to system reorganization during Queen Seondeok's reign, except for Buddhist rites such as the construction of temples, clearly shows this. In addition, it was interpreted that the balance between the two powers was broken by King Uija's invasion west of the Nakdong River in 642, which led to the Rebellion of Sangdaedeung Bidam, the leader of the noble faction, as Queen Seondeok neared death in 647.

== Husbands ==
According to the historical text Samguk yusa, she married Galmunwang Eum (음갈문왕).

According to the disputed text Hwarang Segi, Queen Seondeok had three husbands.

1. Kim Yongchun (김용춘), a child of King Jinji and Princess Cheonmyeong's brother-in-law. He served as an official during King Jinpyeong's reign and served as a Sangdaedeung for Queen Seondeok. Supposedly King Jinpyeong ordered Kim Yong Chun to become Princess Deokman's consort, in hope that a son would be born, so that the kingdom would not be entrusted to a woman. When they failed to conceive a child, Kim Yong Chun asked the king to allow him to retire as Princess Deokman's consort. The king agreed to his request, but asked him to assist Princess Deokman once she took over the throne. He went on to marry Princess Cheonmyeong in order to fulfill his brother's dying wish.
2. Eulje (을제): served as an official during King Jinpyeong's reign and as a Sangdaedeung for Queen Seondeok.
3. Lord Heumban (흠반공): was said to be one of King Jinpyeong's brothers.

According to Changnyeong Jo clan (창녕 조씨) tradition, she was married to the clan founder Jo Gye-ryong (조계룡).

However, it is widely believed that she did not let herself be wed in order to avoid political conflicts, hence the next female rulers after her (Queen Jindeok and Queen Jinseong) were not married either.

== Legends ==
=== Peony flowers and painting ===
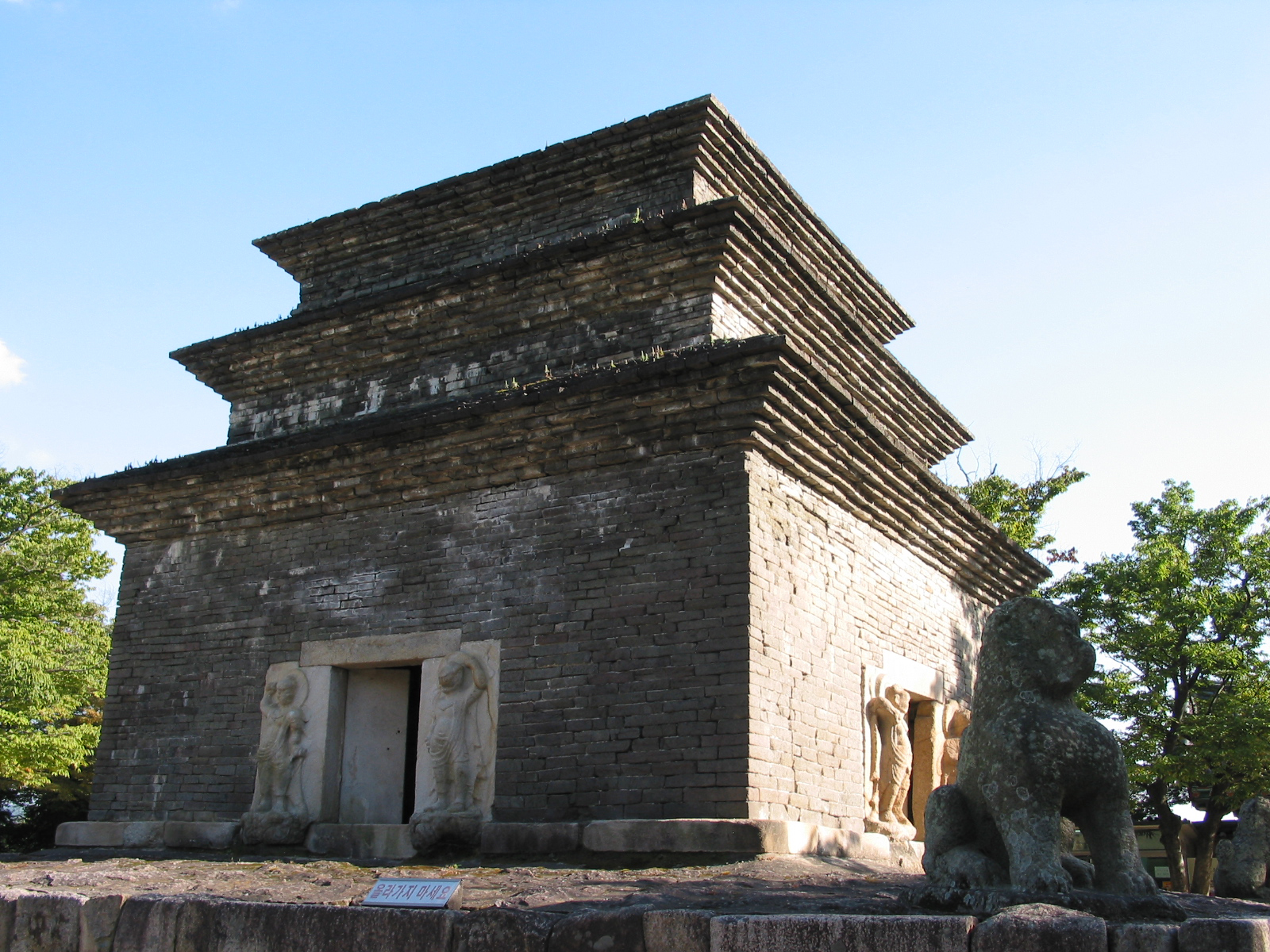
Bunhwangsa

This story is recorded in the Samguk yusa.

Emperor Taizong of China once sent the queen a painting of three peony flowers in red, purple and white, along with its actual seeds. When the queen had the seeds planted in her garden, she made a remark that "even though the flower was pretty, it probably does not have much fragrance". Her words were then proven to be correct when the flowers bloomed, wilted and died, without giving off any scent. People were surprised that she had known of it, and asked her about it. She explained it thus: "The painting showed no butterfly or bees beside the flowers. When he sent me this gift, Emperor Taizong was mocking me for not having a husband."

The peony flower does not have any scent, which is why butterflies were not interested on it — implying the reason why she did not have a husband was probably because no man was interested on her (not being married was seen as something negative for one's character and status during those days). It is said that the temple Bunhwangsa (Fragrance of the Royal Temple) was built as a response to the mockery.

Another version of that story tells that when Queen Seondeok was seven years old, her father King Jinpyeong received a box of peony seeds and a peony painting sent by Emperor Taizong of Tang. When she saw the painting, she commented that even though the flowers are pretty, it must not have much fragrance because no butterflies or bees were around them. Peonies, therefore, are equated with her wisdom and insight.

=== The Legend of Jigwi ===
The Legend of Jigwi is recorded in Daedongunbugunok.

A man named Jigwi, who lived near the border of Goguryeo, went to Seorabeol and saw the queen who was passing by while on a visit to the capital city. He fell in love with her despite their difference in age and social status. He stopped eating and sleeping and did nothing but call out the queen's name all day, eventually losing his mind.

One day, Queen Seondeok went to visit a Buddhist temple to pray. As she was passing by, Jigwi appeared while calling out the queen's name as usual. The queen's guard thrust him aside, causing a commotion. When the queen asked one of her attendants about the commotion, she was told of his story and took pity on him, and allowed him to follow her retinue to the temple. While the queen was praying inside the temple, Jigwi had to wait outside while sitting underneath a pagoda, where he fell asleep. When the queen finally emerged, she noticed Jigwi who was sleeping behind the pagoda. She asked her attendants not to disturb the sleeping man, but placed her bracelet on Jigwi's chest as a keepsake. When Jigwi woke up and saw the bracelet that she had left for him, he was so overwhelmed with joy and love for the queen, that his whole body turned into a fire. The fierce flames of his love burned down the pagoda and Jigwi himself. Some versions of the legend tell that Jigwi burned down himself and the temple to express his burning passion for the queen.

In another version of the story, Jigwi was beaten by the palace guards for calling out the queen's name every day until he could no longer move. His soul became a fire spirit and burned down the pagoda and people's houses. The people who were scared of Jigwi's wrath asked the Queen for help, so she made a talisman for them to put in front of their houses to block away Jigwi's fire spirit.

In a modern version of the story. Jigwi fell in love with Queen Seondeok, whom he met every night through her dream. In her dream, he appears as a handsome Hwarang, who gave her predictions and solutions for the crises she faced as a ruler. Through Jigwi's assistance, Queen Seondeok overcame many problems. They met each other in a bridge in her dream, but suddenly Jigwi stopped appearing in her dreams. The queen started to wonder what happened to the man in her dreams and started to miss him and so she went to the bridge where they used to meet in her dreams. But Jigwi was nowhere to be found, and instead, the one she saw was a sleeping beggar. The queen did not recognize him as the same man who appeared in her dream but still, she decided to leave her bracelet on the chest of the sleeping man. When Jigwi woke up, he was overwhelmed with love and longing for the queen, that his heart turned into a fire that spread through his whole body. The fire flew to heaven and then rain started to fall, which ended the drought in Silla.

=== Croaking Frogs and Jade Gate ===
This story is recorded in the Samguk yusa.

Near the banks of the Seongjin river in the capital city, there was a temple called Yeongmyosa. In the temple grounds was a pond named Okmun ("Jade Gate"). On a certain day in winter, five years into her reign, frogs gathered together at the pond and began to croak loudly for several days. When this strange phenomenon was reported to the queen, she immediately ordered two of her generals to lead 2,000 of her best soldiers to the western suburb of the city, and to look for a valley named Yeogeungok ("Cradle of Life"). She added that an enemy force would be found there lying in wait, which they would be sure to take by surprise. The two generals led their armies to the valley the queen had mentioned, near Mt. Bu, and destroyed not only the detachment of 500 Baekje soldiers they found there, but also a force of 1,200 reinforcements which came later to aid them.

When asked how she had foreseen the Baekje invasion simply because of the croaking of frogs. The queen explained, "A group of angry frogs signifies an army. Jade Gate is an expression for a woman's chastity. Woman is one of the meanings of Yin, which also has the meaning of white, and the white color stands for the West. So I knew that an army was lying in the West. As we say, a man is supposed in some sense to die during the act of creating new life. Since the Baekje army was hiding in the valley known as the Cradle of Life, I knew that it would be easy to defeat them." This shows that the queen was well-versed in the philosophy of Yin and Yang, and interpreted all the icons correctly. It is also remarkable to see the queen's reference to the symbolic "death" of the male during the act of love. The fact that the queen openly dealt with the topic in front of her male courtiers also showed her boldness.

=== Burial near the Doricheon ===
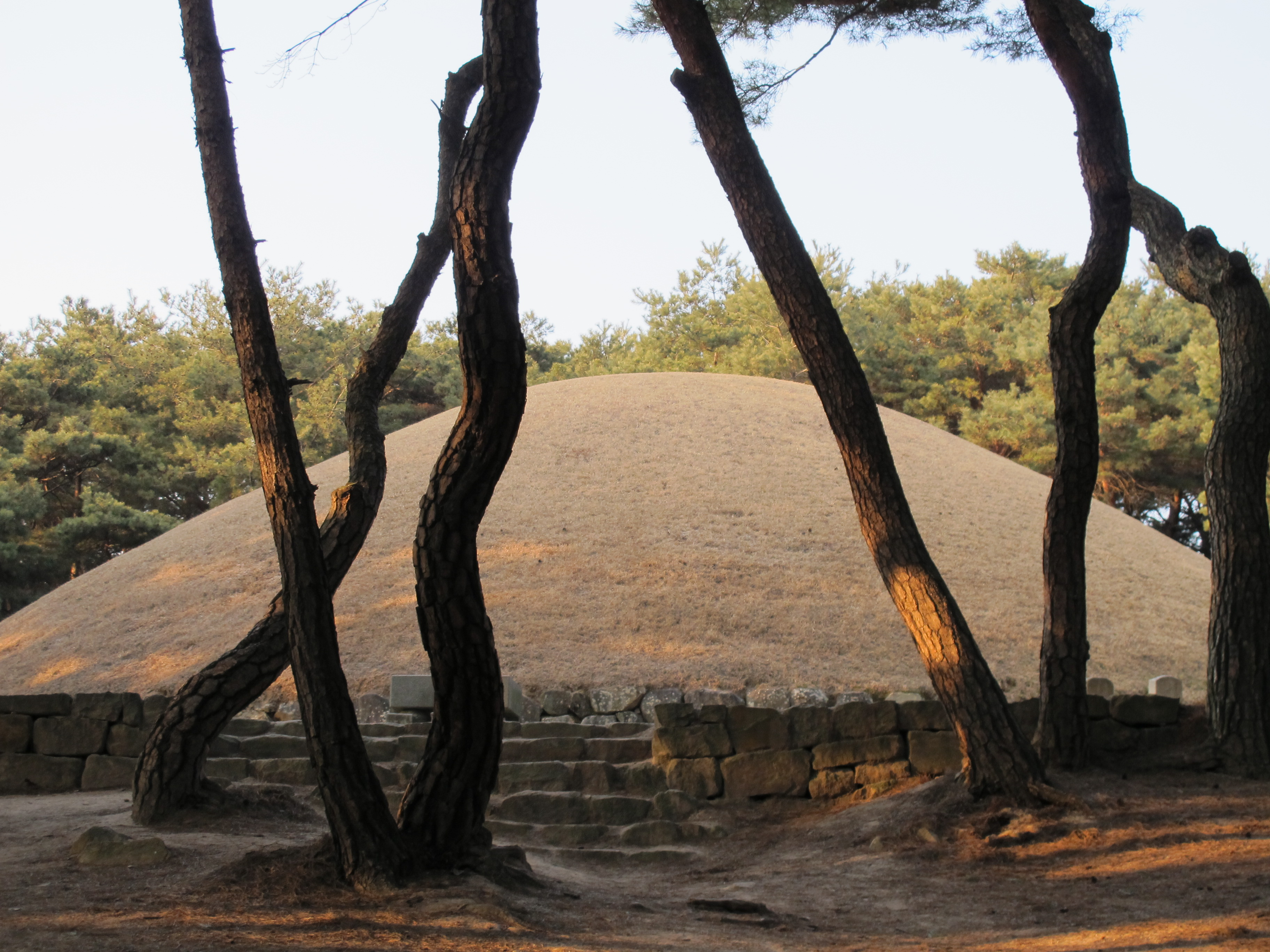
Tomb of Queen Seondeok in Gyeongju

This story is recorded in the Samguk yusa.

Some days before she died, Seondeok gathered her officials and gave the order "When I die, bury me near the Doricheon (忉利天, "Heaven of Grieved Merits")" which in Buddhism refers to a certain level of Heaven. When asked where the Doricheon was, she replied that it was on the southern side of Mt. Namsan. Decades after her death, the thirtieth king Munmu of Silla constructed Sacheonwang-sa (四天王寺, "Temple of the Four Heavenly Kings") in her tomb. Then the nobles realized that one of the Buddha's sayings, "Dori-cheon is above the Sacheonwang-cheon", was accomplished by the queen. However, rather than prediction, some historians think of it as her last wish: having suffered so much jealousy and prejudice for being a woman during her reign, this may have been her way to show her desire to be reincarnated as a man in Doricheon in her next life.

== Family ==
- Father: King Jinpyeong (진평왕; 眞平王, 567–632)
- Mother: Kim Bokhilgu, the Lady Maya (김복힐구 마야부인; 金福肹口 摩耶夫人, dates unknown)
- Siblings:
  - Princess Cheonmyeong (천명공주; 天明公主, dates unknown), 1st or 2nd daughter
    - Kim Yongsu (김용수; 金龍樹, 578–647), Princess Cheonmyeong's husband, 13th Pungwolju.
      - Kim Chun-chu (김춘추; 金春秋, 604–661), 18th Pungwolju; later King (Taejong) Muyeol (태종무열왕; 太宗武烈王).
  - Princess Seonhwa (선화공주; 善化/花公主, dates unknown), 3rd daughter (There is constant debate over her identity.)
- Cousin: Kim Seung-man (김승만; 金勝曼), only daughter of Gukban (국반; 國飯) and Lady Wolmyeong of the Park clan (월명부인 박씨; 月明夫人朴氏); later Queen Jindeok

== In popular culture ==
- Portrayed by Seo Woo Rim in the 1986 KBS TV series Great Monk Wonhyo.
- Portrayed by Kim Hye Jung in the 1992–1993 KBS TV series Chronicle of the three Kingdoms.
- Portrayed by Lee Ae-jung in the 2005–2006 EBS TV series Jump.
- Portrayed by Lee Hyun Jung in the 2006–2007 SBS TV series Yeon Gaesomun
- Portrayed by Lee Yo-won and Nam Ji-hyun in the 2009 MBC TV series Queen Seondeok.
- Portrayed by Yoon So-yi in the 2011 film The Bracelet of Blue Tears.
- Portrayed by Park Joo-mi, Sun Joo-ah and Hong Eun-hee in the 2012–2013 KBS1 TV series Dream of the Emperor.
- She is the leader of the Korean civilization in the Rise and Fall expansion of the 4X video game Civilization VI.
- Seondeok is a playable character in the Mobile/PC Game Rise of Kingdoms.
- Featured in Sheri Holman's Sondok: Princess of the Moon and Stars, Korea, A.D. 595.
- Portrayed by Ahn So Ri in the 2017 KBS TV series Chronicles of Korea.
- Playable hero character in the online video game Art of War
- Portrayed by Choi Su-rin in the 2026–2027 KBS2 TV series Sword & Silence.

== See also ==
- Three Kingdoms of Korea
- History of Korea
- Rulers of Korea
- Queen Seondeok (TV series)
- Sondok: Princess of the Moon and Stars (Korea, 595 A.D.)

== Sources ==
- Lee, Bae-yong (2008). Women in Korean History. Ewha Womans University Press.
- Wollock, Jennifer G. (2011). Rethinking Chivalry and Courtly Love. Praeger.
- KSCPP
- 선덕여왕. 문화원형백과 (in Korean).
- 선덕여왕. 인물한국사 (in Korean).

Queen Seondeok of Silla House of Kim Died: 647
Regnal titles
Preceded by Jinpyeong	Queen of Silla; 632–647	Succeeded by Jindeok
