= Pusansŏng =

Former fortress in Gyeongju, South Korea

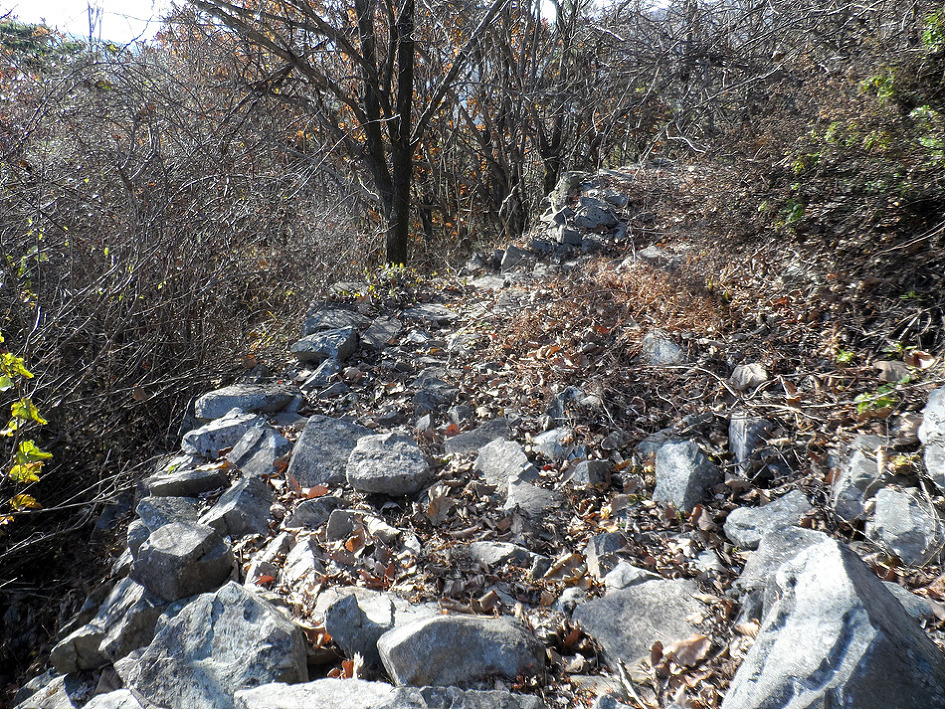
- Remains of Pusansŏng's south gate (2016)
- Interactive map of Pusansŏng
- Location: Gyeongju, South Korea
- Coordinates: 35°50′49″N 129°03′16″E
- Built: 6th or 7th century AD

Historic Sites of South Korea
- Official name: Busanseong Fortress, Gyeongju
- Designated: 1963-01-21
- Reference no.: 25

Pusansŏng (Korean: 부산성; Hanja: 富山城) was a Unified Silla–era Korean fortress on the mountain Busan (부산; 富山) in what is now Gyeongju, South Korea. On January 21, 1963, it was made Historic Site of South Korea No. 25.

There are conflicting records of when the fortress was built. It was possibly built during the reigns of either King Jinpyeong (r. 579–632) or King Munmu (r. 661–681). It was used in the Goryeo period (918–1392) and in the Joseon period (1392–1897) after having been repaired a number of times. Modern estimates give its circumference as 9,470 m (31,070 ft). It possibly had two sets of walls. Almost all of the fortress's remains are in ruins, although a stretch of wall around 20 m (66 ft) in length is reportedly in decent condition. The possible sites of former buildings and villages within the fortress have been identified.
