= Kim Yongchun =

- Hangul: 김용춘
- Hanja: 金龍春
- RR: Gim Yongchun
- MR: Kim Yongch'un

Kim Yongchun (Korean: 김용춘; Hanja: 金龍春, 578–647) was member of Silla Royal Family, Hwarang and Gukseon (國仙) from 596 to 603.

He was the son of King Jinji and brother-in-law of Princess Cheonmyeong through his brother, Kim Yongsu. He served as a minister during King Jinpyeong's reign and served as a Sangdaedeung for Queen Seondeok. He went on to marry Princess Cheonmyeong later on, in order to fulfill his brother's dying wish.

It is said that Princess Cheonmyeong was in love with him. When the talk of her marriage had come, the Queen asked her if there is anyone on her mind. Princess Cheonmyeong tried to say "Kim Yongchun" but she stuttered and so, her mother thought that she was talking about Kim Yongsu (Kim Yongchu's older brother). Kim Yonsu was aware of Princess Cheonmyeong's feelings for his brother and asked him to marry her instead. But Kim Yongchun refused out of respect for his brother who might end up a laughing-stock. Queen Maya asked him as well but he still refused with the same reason. And so, Princess Cheonmyeong and Kim Yongsu got married. Years had passed and Kim Yongsu fell ill and, on his deathbed, asked his brother once again to marry Princess Cheonmyeong as his dying wish and to take care of his son as Kim Yongchu's own. Kim Yongchu agreed, married Princess Cheonmyeong, and took Kim Chunchu as his son. But this story is not mentioned in the historical texts Samguk sagi and Samguk yusa. This story is only mentioned in the disputed text Hwarang Segi.

After Kim Chunchu (the son of Kim Yongsu (金龍樹)) ascended the throne as King Muyeol of Silla, Kim Yongchun was given the honorific title of "King Munheung" (문흥대왕; 文興大王) in 654.

== Popular culture ==
- Portrayed by Jung Dong-hwan in the 2012–2013 KBS1 TV series Dream of the Emperor.
