= Mangdŏksa =

Former temple in Gyeongju, South Korea

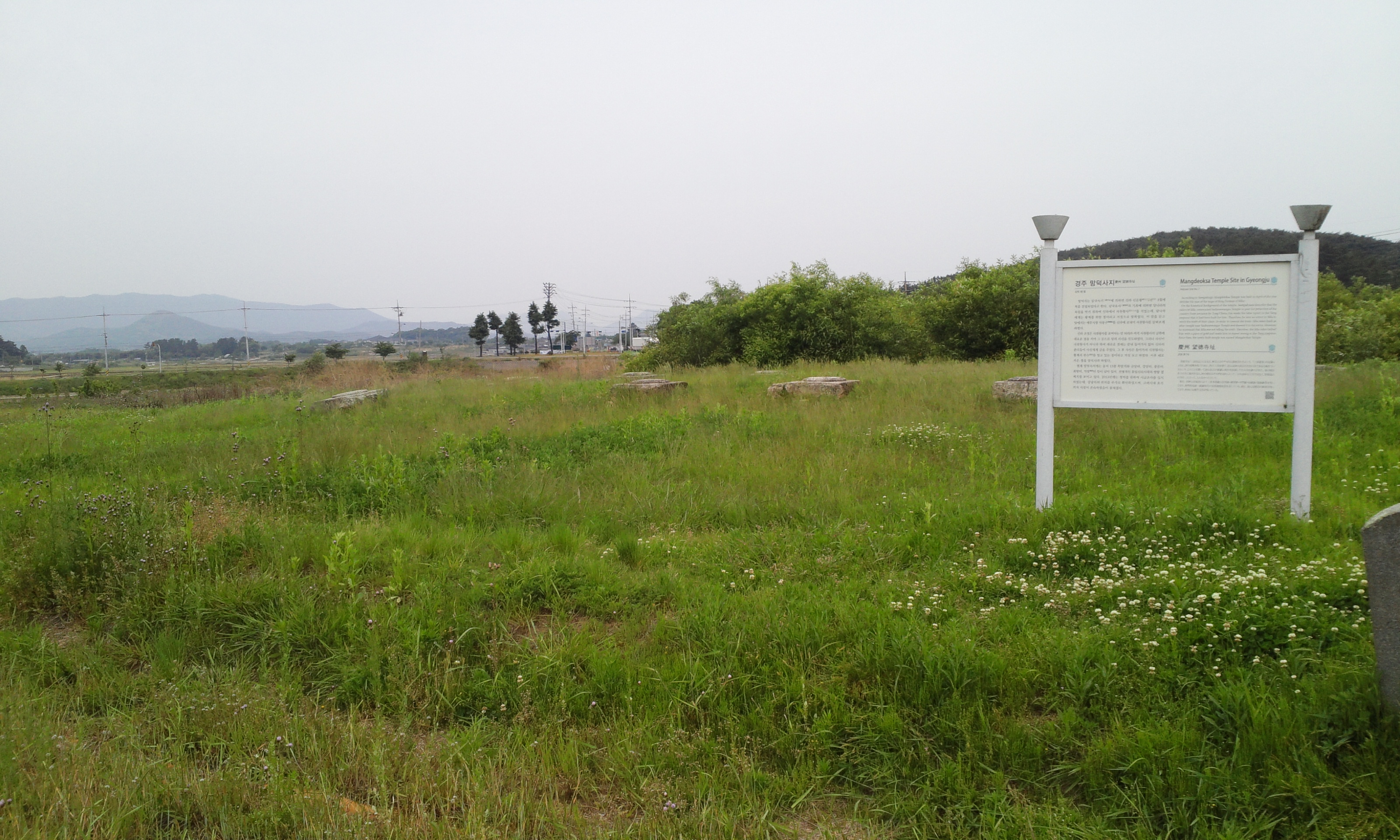

Religion
- Affiliation: Korean Buddhism

Location
- Interactive map of Mangdŏksa
- Coordinates: 35°49′03″N 129°14′35″E

Architecture
- Completed: 685 or 692
- Destroyed: Unknown
- Historic Sites of South Korea
- Official name: Mangdeoksa Temple Site, Gyeongju
- Designated: 1963-01-21
- Reference no.: 7

Mangdŏksa (Korean: 망덕사; Hanja: 望德寺; RR: Mangdeoksa) was a Unified Silla-era Buddhist temple on Nangsan in what is now Gyeongju, South Korea. It was completed in either 685 or 692 (Korean calendar), during the reign of King Munmu. It is not known when the temple became defunct. On January 21, 1963, its former location was made Historic Site of South Korea No. 7.

The remains of the temple were protected during the 1910–1945 Japanese colonial period, but after the 1945 liberation of Korea, they became sold to private owners who converted them into farmland. This made it difficult to excavate the site. There are a number of remains of the temple that still exist, including the sites of buildings, stairways, and statues. The site was excavated three times by from 1969 to 1971. In 2013, the site was excavated and some restoration and preservation work was carried out.
