= Queen Munmyeong =

Queen consort of Silla
- Spouse: Muyeol of Silla

Queen Munmyeong (Korean: 문명왕후; Hanja: 文明王后; d. 681) (Note: Her birth name was Kim Munhee (김문희; 金文姬), and she was the younger sister of Kim Yushin and daughter of General Kim Seohyun and Lady Manmyeong.) was a Korean queen consort. She was the spouse of King Muyeol of Silla.

== Issue ==
1. King Munmu of Silla (626 – 681)
2. Kim Inmun (김인문; 金仁問; 629 – 694)
3. Lady Jiso (지소부인; 智炤夫人)

== In popular culture ==
- Portrayed by Lina in the 2012 KBS TV series Dream of the Emperor
- Portrayed by Shin Yu Ju in the 2017 KBS TV series Chronicles of Korea
