= Twin Tombs, Iksan =

Baekje-era tombs in Iksan, South Korea

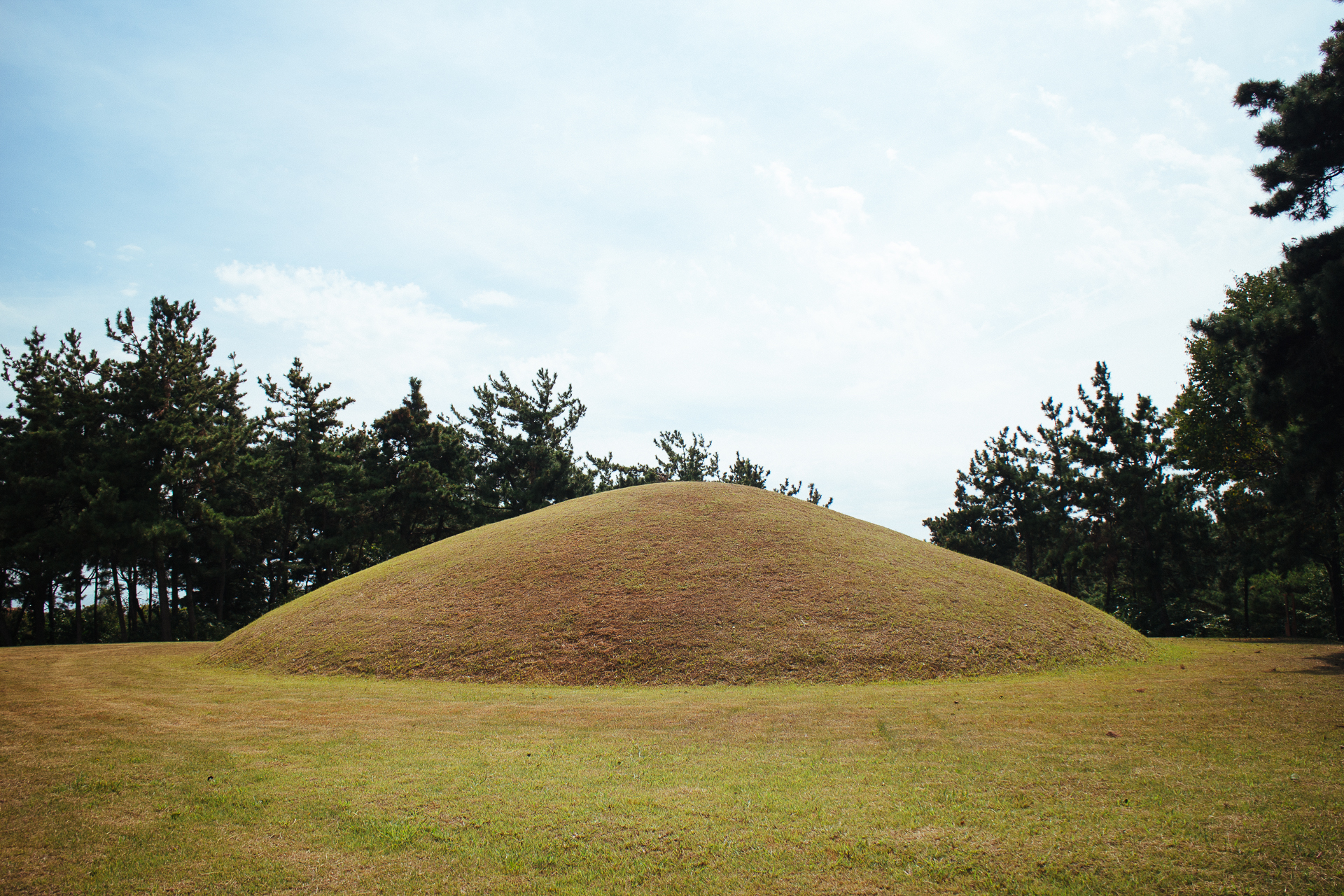
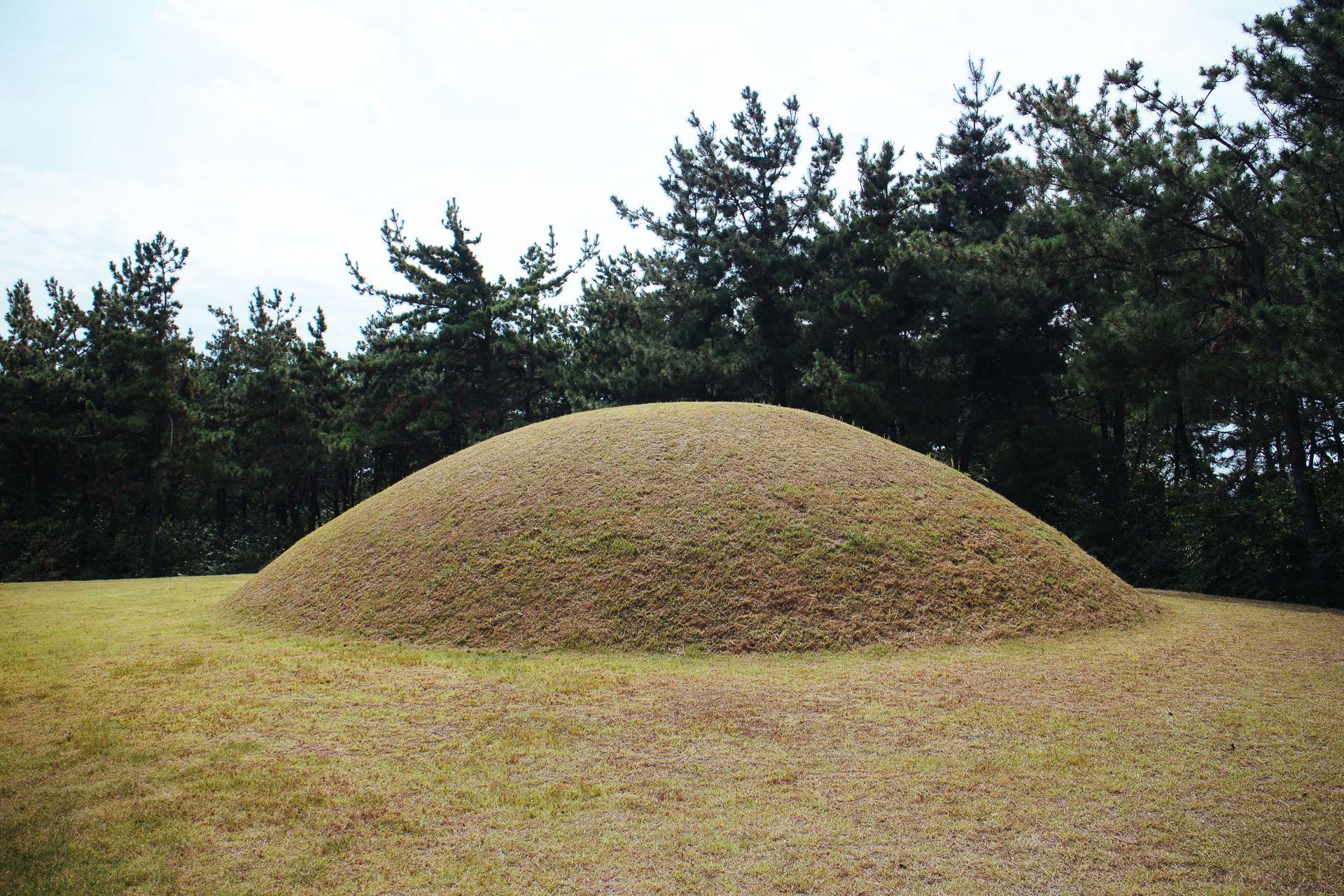
- The tombs (2016)
- Interactive map of Twin Tombs, Iksan
- Location: Iksan, South Korea
- Coordinates: 35°58′44″N 127°1′53″E
- Built for: Mu of Baekje (presumed); Princess Seonhwa of Silla (presumed)

Historic Sites of South Korea
- Designated: 1963-01-21

The Twin Tombs (Korean: 쌍릉; Hanja: 雙陵) are Baekje-era tombs in Iksan, South Korea. They are so named because they are placed side-by-side. On January 21, 1963, they were made a Historic Site of South Korea.

They are considered to be both royal tombs. One is larger than the other. They were excavated in 1916, during the Japanese colonial period, but no relics from the excavation have been given to South Korean archaeologists. The larger tomb had a coffin in it; it has been restored. The larger tomb possibly belongs to King Mu, whom founded the nearby temple of Mireuksa. The smaller tomb possibly belongs to his wife Princess Seonhwa.
