= Ballad of Seodong =

2005–2006 South Korean television series

- Promotional poster
- Also known as: Ballad of Suhdong; Seodong's Song; Song of the Prince
- Hangul: 서동요
- Hanja: 薯童謠
- RR: Seodongyo
- MR: Sŏdongyo
- Genre: Period drama; Romance; Drama
- Written by: Kim Young-hyun
- Directed by: Lee Byung-hoon MBC
- Starring: Jo Hyun-jae; Lee Bo-young; Ryu Jin
- Country of origin: South Korea
- Original language: Korean
- No. of episodes: 55

Production
- Producer: Kim Kyung-min
- Production company: Kim Jong-hak Production

Original release
- Network: Seoul Broadcasting System
- Release: September 5, 2005 – March 21, 2006

Ballad of Seodong (Korean: 서동요) is a South Korean television series starring Jo Hyun-jae, Lee Bo-young, and Ryu Jin. It aired on SBS from September 5, 2005 to March 21, 2006 on Mondays and Tuesdays at 21:55 for 55 episodes.

The period drama is based on Seodong-yo, said to be one of Korea's oldest folk songs and its first hyangga. According to the Samguk yusa ("Memorabilia of the Three Kingdoms") from the Silla Kingdom, the song was written by Seodong, a commoner from the Baekje Kingdom. Hearing that Princess Seonhwa, daughter of King Jinpyeong of Silla, was beautiful, he writes a song saying that the princess visits Seodong's room every night, and it quickly spreads throughout the kingdom and beyond, until it reaches the palace in Silla. When her father hears the song, he condemns the innocent princess to exile. Seodong finds Seonhwa, marries her and takes her to Baekje, and they become the royal rulers of the country.

== Plot ==
Seodong is just a commoner, a technician who grew up in Baekje's prestigious science and technology institute Taehaksa, but his life is on the brink of extraordinary change. He meets and falls for Princess Seonhwa of the rival kingdom Silla, and his love for her transcends social position. Seodong also carries a secret that could alter the fate of the Baekje kingdom, but his rival Sataek Giru plots with Buyeo Seon to disrupt his plans.

== Cast ==
Main:

- Jo Hyun-jae as Seodong (Wideok's youngest son, later King Mu of Baekje)
  - Kim Seok as young Seodong
- Lee Bo-young as Princess Seonhwa of Silla (Jinpyeong's daughter)
  - Choi Jin-ri as young Princess Seonhwa
- Ryu Jin as Sataek Giru / Kim Do-ham
- Kim Young-ho as Buyeo Seon (Buyeo Gye's son, later King Beop of Baekje)
- Lee Chang-hoon as Mok Ra-soo
- Jung Sun-kyung as Mo-jin

Supporting:

- Lee Il-hwa as Yeon Ga-mo (Seodong's mother)
- Jung Wook as King Wideok of Baekje
- Jung Jae-gon as Prince Ah-jwa of Baekje (Wideok's oldest son)
- Park Tae-ho as Buyeo Gye (Wideok's younger brother, later King Hye of Baekje)
- Heo Young-ran as Princess Wooyoung of Baekje (Buyeo Gye's daughter, Buyeo Seon's younger half-sister)
- Han In-soo as Hae Do-joo
- Lee Byung-sik as Jin-ryeo
- Maeng Sang-hoon as Wang Gu
- Na Jae-woong as Ahtaek Geolchwi
- Son Joon-hyung as Baek Mu
- Im Hyun-sik as Maek Do-soo
- Baek Bong-ki as Beom-ro (Maek Do-soo's youngest son)
- Oh Seung-yoon as Beom-saeng (Maek Do-soo's oldest son)
- Koo Hye-sun as Eun-jin (Mo-jin's daughter)
- Lee Sook as Kook-soo
- Lee Seung-ah as Woo-soo
- Shin Gook as Ko Mo
- Song Young-yong as Ah So-ji
- Kim Yoo-jin as Joo Ri-young
- Byun Il-tae as Koyi Soji
- Choi Dong-joon as King Jinpyeong of Silla (Seonhwa's father)
- Kim Hwa-ran as Queen Maya of Silla (Seonhwa's mother)
- Lee Kyung-hwa as Princess Cheonmyeong of Silla (Seonhwa's older sister, Jinpyeong's daughter)
- Na Sung-kyoon as Kim Sa-heum (Kim Do-ham's father)
- Kim Jin-ho as Wi Song
- Ahn Yeo-jin as Bo-myung
- Noh Yoon as Cho-ki
- Seo Beom-shik as Seo-chung
- Sung Chang-hoon as Koo-san
- Lee Hee-do as Heuk Chi-pyeong
- Ha Sung-chul as soldier
- Kim Se-min as Jang-doo
- Ryu Sung-hoon as warrior
- Lee Hwan as butler
- Bang Kil-seung as Yak-san
- Yuny Han as Buyeo Seon's wife
- Han Bo-bae
- Jin Tae-hyun as Yoo-rim
- Kwon Yong-woon
- Park Kyung-hwan
- Kwon Hyuk
- Joo Min-soo
- Yoo Hyun-ji as young princess
- Seol Ji-yoon as technician So-young

== Ratings ==
In the tables below, the blue numbers represent the lowest ratings and the red numbers represent the highest ratings.

Episode #	Original broadcast date	Average audience share (TNmS Ratings)	
Episode #	Original broadcast date	Nationwide	Seoul National Capital Area
1	1/2/2005	16.8%	18.2%
2	2/2/2005	17.6%	19.0%
3	3/2/2005	18.8%	21.6%
4	4/2/2005	17.8%	20.1%
5	5/2/2005	17.9%	19.8%
6	6/2/2005	18.5%	19.8%
7	7/2/2005	19.6%	21.6%
8	8/2/2005	18.6%	19.5%
9	9/2/2005	17.8%	18.6%
10	10/2/2005	19.6%	21.6%
11	11/2/2005	20.0%	21.6%
12	12/2/2005	16.7%	17.4%
13	13/2/2005	17.2%	18.1%
14	14/2/2005	16.9%	18.2%
15	15/2/2005	16.9%	17.7%
16	16/2/2005	15.2%	16.6%
17	17/2/2005	16.4%	17.5%
18	18/2/2005	16.8%	17.6%
19	19/2/2005	13.7%	12.9%
20	20/2/2005	16.4%	17.7%
21	21/2/2005	15.6%	17.7%
22	22/2/2005	14.6%	15.8%
23	23/2/2005	16.5%	17.8%
24	24/2/2005	16.9%	17.4%
25	25/2/2005	17.4%	19.3%
26	26/2/2005	17.1%	18.5%
27	27/2/2005	16.5%	17.8%
28	28/2/2005	16.8%	17.7%
29	29/2/2005	17.1%	18.2%
30	1/3/2005	18.1%	19.5%
31	2/3/2005	18.7%	19.8%
32	3/3/2005	19.3%	20.9%
33	4/3/2005	20.9%	22.4%
34	5/3/2005	23.1%	24.3%
35	6/3/2005	21.2%	22.2%
36	7/3/2005	23.8%	25.7%
37	8/3/2005	23.0%	24.0%
38	9/3/2005	22.9%	23.7%
39	10/3/2005	21.6%	22.0%
40	11/3/2005	24.1%	24.8%
41	12/3/2005	23.7%	24.6%
42	13/3/2005	22.2%	23.2%
43	14/3/2005	22.9%	24.2%
44	15/3/2005	21.3%	22.0%
45	16/3/2005	25.4%	26.6%
46	17/3/2005	23.3%	24.1%
47	18/3/2005	23.6%	24.3%
48	19/3/2005	22.9%	23.1%
49	20/3/2005	25.3%	26.5%
50	21/3/2005	25.2%	25.9%
51	22/3/2005	26.7%	27.2%
52	23/3/2005	23.3%	24.5%
53	24/3/2005	23.9%	25.1%
54	25/3/2005	24.0%	25.5%
55	26/3/2005	25.0%	26.0%
Average		19.8%	21.0%
