= Dream of the Emperor =

2012–2013 South Korean television series

- Promotional poster
- Also known as: The King's Dream; Dream of the King
- Hangul: 대왕의 꿈
- Hanja: 大王의 꿈
- RR: Daewangui kkum
- MR: Taewangŭi kkum
- Written by: Yoo Dong-yoon; Kim Seon-deok
- Directed by: Shin Chang-seok; Kim Sang-hwi
- Starring: Choi Soo-jong; Kim Yu-seok; Park Joo-mi; Hong Eun-hee; Lee Young-ah; Jang Dong-jik
- Opening theme: "The Heart's Road" by Jessica Jung
- Country of origin: South Korea
- No. of episodes: 70 + 5 specials

Production
- Executive producer: Kim Hyung-il
- Producer: Han Joon-seo
- Camera setup: Multi-camera
- Running time: Saturdays and Sundays at 21:40 (KST)
- Production company: KBS Drama Production Bureau

Original release
- Network: Korean Broadcasting System
- Release: September 8, 2012 – June 9, 2013

Dream of the Emperor (Korean: 대왕의 꿈; RR: Daewangui kkum) is a South Korean television series that aired on KBS1 from September 8, 2012 to June 9, 2013 on Saturdays and Sundays at 21:40 for 70 episodes.

== Plot ==
Kim Chun-chu is the grandson of King Jinji, but when his grandfather is overthrown, Chun-chu is denied the chance to become a successor to the throne of Silla. He later meets Kim Yu-shin, and the two men begin a friendship. Chun-chu later becomes King Muyeol, the 29th Silla monarch who leads the unification of three ancient Kingdoms – Goguryeo, Baekje and Silla, while Kim Yu-shin becomes one of the greatest generals in Korean history.

== Cast ==
=== Main characters ===
- Choi Soo-jong as Kim Chun-chu, later King Taejong Muyeol of Silla
  - Chae Sang-woo as young Chun-chu
- Kim Yu-seok as Kim Yu-shin
  - Noh Young-hak as young Yu-shin
- Park Joo-mi (ep. 8 – 18) and Hong Eun-hee (episode 19 – 70) as Princess Deok-man, later Queen Seondeok of Silla
  - Seon Joo-ah as young Deok-man
- Lee Young-ah as Queen Seungman
  - Kim Hyun-soo as young Seungman
- Son Yeo-eun as Princess Seung-man, later Queen Jindeok of Silla

=== Supporting characters ===
Kim Chun-chu's family

- Jung Dong-hwan as Kim Yong-chun (Chun-chu's father)
- Jo Kyung-sook as Princess Cheonmyeong (Chun-chu's mother)
- Choo So-young as Princess Bora (Chun-chu's first wife)
- Lina as Kim Mun-hui, later Queen Munmyeong (Chun-chu's second wife and Yu-shin's sister)
- Greena Park as Kim Go-ta-so
  - Jung Da-bin as young Kim Go-ta-so
- Lee Jong-soo as Kim Beop-min, later King Munmu of Silla
  - Kim Jin-seong as young Beop-min
- Jeon Kwang-jin as Kim In-mun
- Choi Kyu-hyun as Queen Jaui
- Jo Yong-jin as Kim Jeong-myeong

Kim Yushin's family

- Choi Il-hwa as Kim Seo-hyeon (Yu-shin's father)
  - Kim Dong-yoon as young Seo-hyeon
- Kim Ye-ryeong as Lady Man-myeong (Yu-shin's mother)
  - Kim Hyung-mi as young Man-myeong
- Min Ji-ah as Kim Bo-hui (Yu-shin's sister)
- Park Jae-woong as Kim Heum-sun (Yu-shin's younger brother)
- Kim Hyun-sook as Lady Jaemae
- Kim Dong-yoon as Kim Sam-kwang
- Baek Seung-woo as Kim Won-sul
- Lee Seul-bi as Lady Jiso (Yu-shin's third wife and Chun-chu's daughter)

Silla Royal Family

- Kim Ha-kyoon as King Jinpyeong
- Jung Jae-soon as Queen Dowager Sado
- Hong Il-kwon as Galmunwang Guk-ban (Jinpyeong's brother)
- Jo Yang-ja as Queen Dowager Manho
- Im Nan-hyung as Queen Maya
- Lee Si-won as Princess Bo-ryang
- Jang Min-kyo as Prince Bo-ro
- Chun Bo-geun as Man-hwa

Silla nobles and politicians

- Im Hyuk as Kim Al-cheon
- Seo In-seok as Suk Eul-jong
- Lee Woo-suk as Lord Eul-je
- Choi Cheol-ho as Bi-dam
- Park Chil-yong as Kim Hu-jik
- Yang Jae-sung as Im Jong
- Lee Il-jae as Ho-rim
- Bae Do-hwan as Yeom Jang
  - Kim Ki-doo as young Yeom Jang
- Baek Jae-jin as Man-chun
- Kang Ji-hoo as Yeom Jong
- Kim Myung-gook as Geum Kang
- Lee Won-seok as Sa-jin

Silla's renaissance

- Kim Hyuk as Geom Goon
- Choi Wang-soon as Ye Won
- Lee Myung-ho as Yang Do
- Jung Wook as Goon Kwan
- Yoo Min-ho as Chun Kwang
- Yoon Hong-bin as Kwan Chang
- Kim Ji-hoon as Ban Gul
- Lee Won-bal as Kim Pu-mil
- Choi Kyu-hwan as Kim Jin-ju
- Jung Dong-kyu as Kim Jin-heum

Other Silla figures

- Lee Dae-ro as Monk Wongwang
- Jo Jae-wan as Baek Seok
- Choi Beom-ho as Chan-deok
- Lee Chul-min as Chil-suk
- Yeom Cheol-ho as Seok-pum
- Kim Hong-pyo as Kim Pum-seok
- Lee Byung-wook as Geom Il
- Kim Tae-hyung as Kang-su
- Kim Hyung-il as Dong Ta-cheon

Gwimundan

- Jang Dong-jik as Bi-hyeong
- Kim Kyung-ryong as Nan-seung
- Lee Jung-yong as Gil-dal
- Noh Young-jo as young On Goon-hae
- Lee Se-young as Chun Gwan-nyeo
- Kim Jin-yi as Si-noh
- Hong Soo-ah as Yeon-hwa
  - Kang Ye-seo as young Yeon-hwa
- Lee Ah-yi as Cha-bi
  - Lee Hye-in as young Cha-bi
- Jang Joon-nyung as Mo-cheok
- Maya as Ho-rang
- Kim Hyun-jung as Myo-rang

Goguryeo

- Choi Dong-joon as Yeon Gae-so-mun
- Ahn Shin-woo as King Bojang of Goguryeo
- Kim Seon-dong as Noi Eum-shin

Baekje

- Park Chul-ho as King Mu of Baekje
- Lee Jin-woo as King Uija of Baekje
- Cha Gi-hwan as Gye-ru
- Gong Jung-hwan as Buyeo Yung
- Heo Jung-min as Buyeo Tae
- Kim Min-ki as Buyeo Hyo
- Jang Tae-sung as Buyeo Pung
- Choi Jae-sung as General Gye-baek
- Jo Eun-sook as Gye-baek's wife
- Kim Chul-ki as Do-chung
- Kim Young-ki as Boksin
- Choi Woo-joon as Yun Chung
- Kim Won-bae as Seong Chung
- Im Byung-ki as Hong-su
- Won Seok-yeon as Sang-young
- Choi Dong-yub as Ui-jik
- Hong In-young as Hwa-si
- Jung Seung-woo as Do-jim
- Jo Tae-bong as Chung-seung

Tang Dynasty

- Yoon Seung-won as Emperor Taizong of Tang
- Seo Dong-soo as Emperor Gaozong of Tang
- Jung Heung-chae as So Jeong-bang
- Bang Hyung-joo as Dong Bo-ryang
- Sun Dong-hyuk as Yu In-won
- Kim Young-sun as Yu In-gwe
- Choi Nak-hee as Son In-sa
- Oh Sang-hoon as Tang commander

Japan

- Kim Min-kyung as Empress Kōgyoku
- Ahn Hong-jin as Prince Naka no Ōe
- Noh Seung-jin as Nakatomi no Kamatari
- Jung Jin-gak as Soga no Iruka
