= Princess Seonhwa of Silla =

Queen consort of Baekje (fl. 7th century)

Princess Seonhwa
- Queen consort of Baekje
- Burial: Twin Tombs, Iksan
- Spouse: disputed between King Mu or King Dongseong
- Issue: Uija of Baekje?
Names
- Gim Seon-hwa (김선화; 金善花)
- House: Gyeongju Gim (by birth)
- Father: Jinpyeong of Silla
- Mother: Lady Maya

Korean name
- Hangul: 선화공주
- Hanja: 善花公主
- RR: Seonhwa gongju
- MR: Sŏnhwa kongju

Princess Seonhwa (Korean: 선화공주; Hanja: 善花公主) was a Silla royal princess as the third daughter of King Jinpyeong and Lady Maya, younger sister to Princess Deokman and Princess Cheonmyeong, according to the Samguk yusa. She was also the queen consort of Baekje since 600 CE as the wife of King Mu.

However, her existence is controversial due to the discovery of evidence that points to King Uija's mother as being Queen Sataek and not Seonhwa as indicated by historical records. There is also a theory said that Seonhwa married to King Dongseong, not King Mu, which made various hypotheses about her status, such as the princess of Baekje, a noblewoman (귀족), even a daughter of a local noble (호족) instead of Silla's princess.

== Biography ==
The Prince of Baekje, Seodong who loved her went to Gyeongju, the capital city of Shilla and he taught and made the children in there to sing a nursery rhyme which made by himself while provided Korean yams for them in reward for good performance of it. The children's song is called Seo Dong Yo (서동요; 薯童謠), which tells a secret love story of a Princess Seonhwa sneaking out to get together with Seodong every night. Soon, hearing the news of all the children in the whole city going around singing the song, the King Jinpyeong goes through the roof and expels the Princess Seonhwa out of Gyeongju.

On her way to a place of exile, the Princess Seonhwa met Seodong and fell in love with him, ending up go over to Baekje to live with him. Later, Seodong became the King Mu of Baekje, and Princess Seonhwa his wife. Princess Seonhwa asked the King Mu to build Mireuksa in Iksan, North Jeolla Province. And she and the King Mu had a son who was destined to be the last King of Baekje Dynasty, Uija of Baekje.

A tomb in Iksan is believed to belong to her.

== In popular culture ==
- Portrayed by Jang Heejin in the 1992–1993 KBS1 TV series Samgukgi.
- Portrayed by Sulli and Lee Bo-young in the 2005–2006 SBS TV series Ballad of Seodong.
- Portrayed by Shin Eun-jung in the 2011 MBC TV series Gyebaek.

== See also ==
- Mireuksa
- Seodong-yo
