= Tomb of King Muyeol =

Silla-era tomb in Gyeongju, South Korea

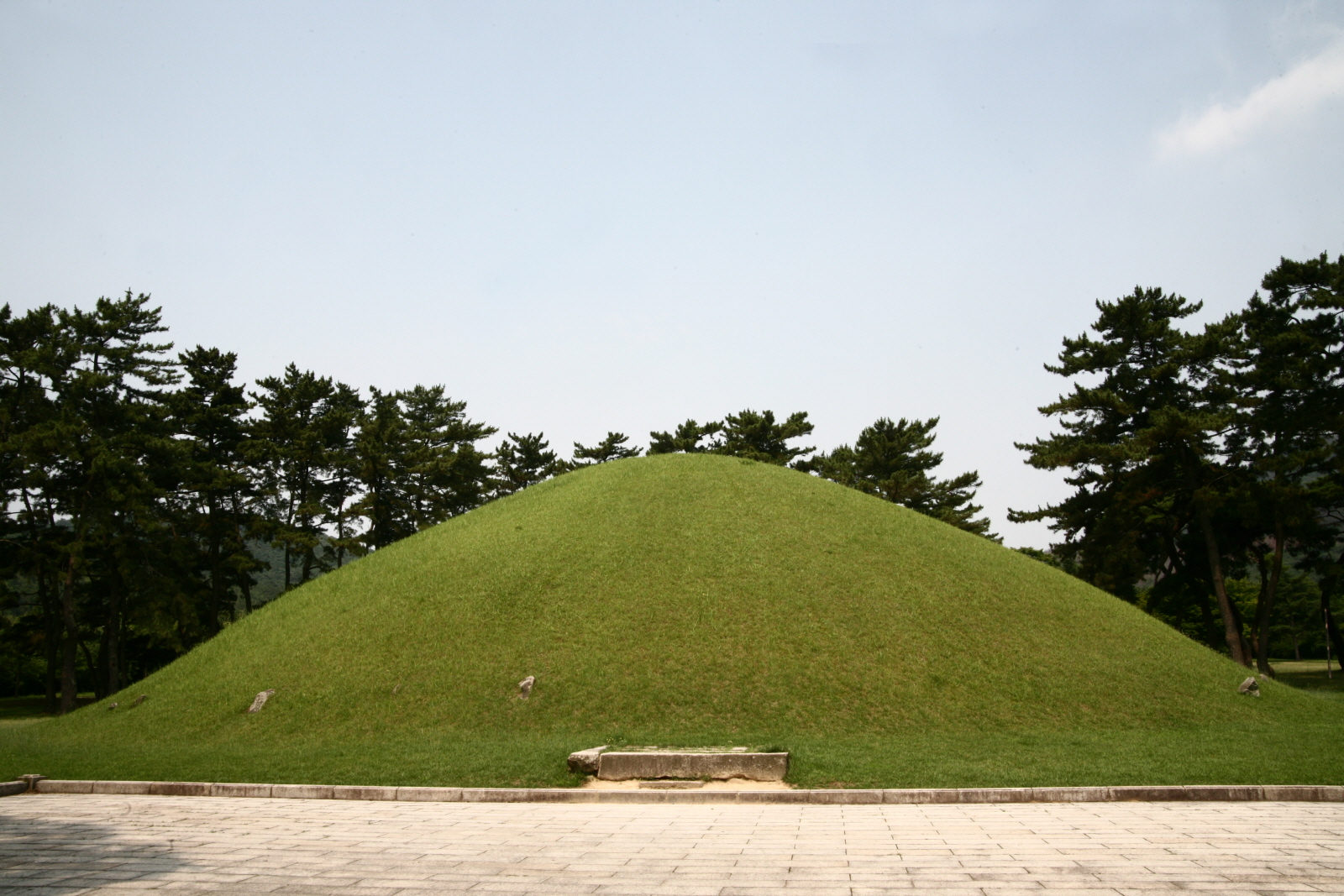
- The tomb
- Interactive map of Tomb of King Muyeol
- Location: Gyeongju, South Korea
- Coordinates: 35.8251°N 129.1859°E
- Built for: Muyeol of Silla

Historic Sites of South Korea
- Designated: 1963-01-21
- Reference no.: 20

The Tomb of King Muyeol (Korean: 무열왕릉; Hanja: 武烈王陵) is the tomb of Muyeol of Silla (r. 654–661) and is currently located in Seoak-dong, Gyeongju, South Korea. On January 21, 1963, it was designated Historic Site of South Korea No. 20.

The tomb has yet to be excavated. It is a tumulus tomb that is approximately 13 m (43 ft) high and has a circumference of 112 m (367 ft). There is a partially remaining monument to the tomb in its front. This monument was damaged during the Joseon period (1392–1897). Because of writings on the monument, it is known with certainty who the tomb belongs to. This is the only Silla tomb for which we know the owner's identity with certainty.
