= Munmu of Silla =

30th monarch of Silla (r. 661–681)

Munmu of Silla 문무왕 文武王
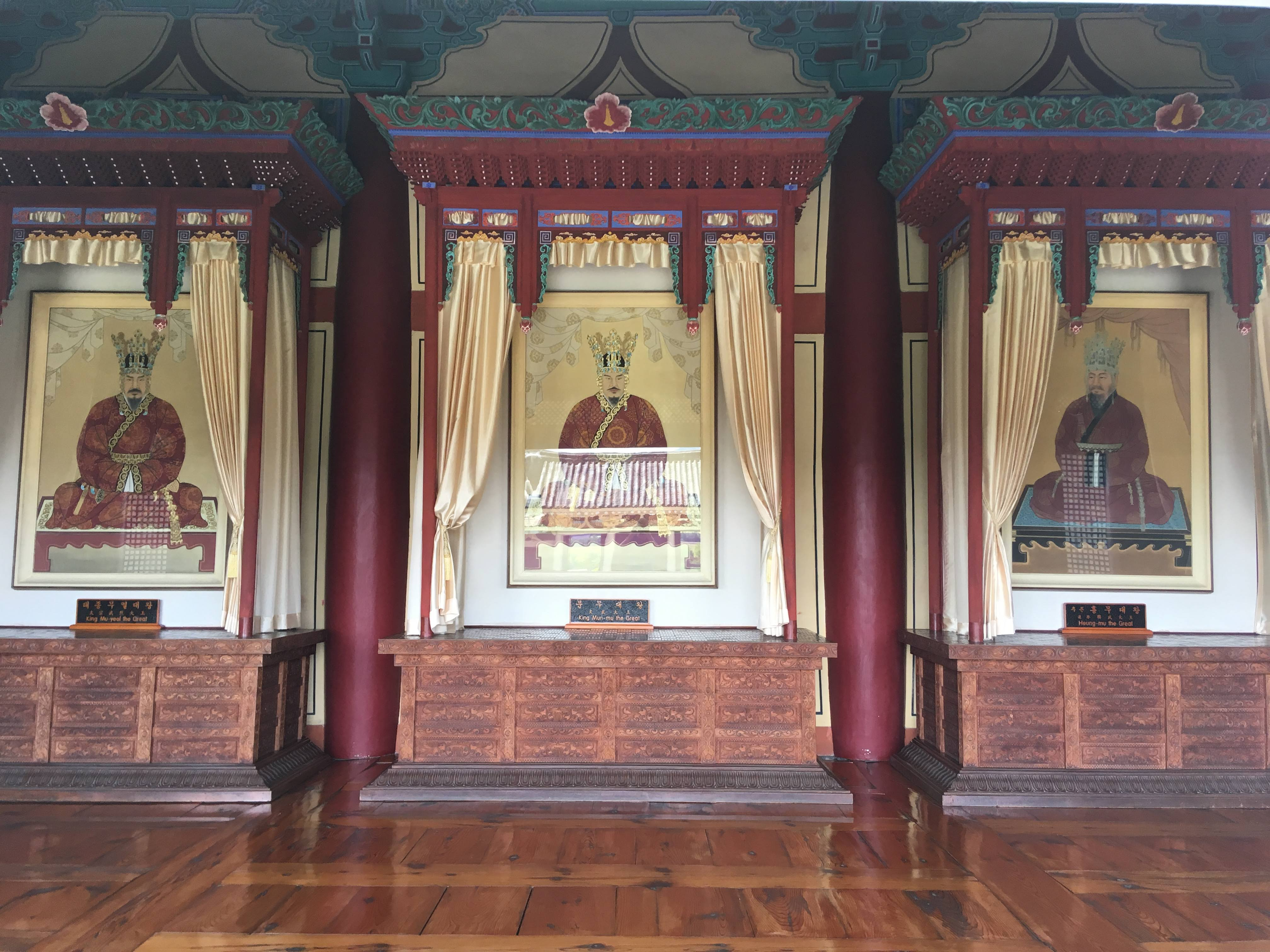
- A modern take on King Munmu's visage.(center)

King of Silla
- Reign: 661–681
- Coronation: 661
- Predecessor: Muyeol of Silla
- Successor: Sinmun of Unified Silla
- Born: 626; Gyeongju, North Gyeongsang Province, Silla
- Died: July 24, 681; Gyeongju, North Gyeongsang Province, Silla
Posthumous name
- King Munmu (文武王, 문무왕)
- Father: Muyeol of Silla
- Mother: Queen Munmyeong

- Munmu of Silla
- Hangul: 김법민
- Hanja: 金法敏
- RR: Gim Beopmin
- MR: Kim Pŏmmin

Posthumous name
- Hangul: 문무왕
- Hanja: 文武王
- RR: Munmuwang
- MR: Munmuwang

Munmu (626–681), personal name Kim Pŏmmin, was a Korean monarch who served as the 30th king of the Korean kingdom of Silla. He is usually considered to have been the first ruler of the Unified Silla period. Munmu was the son of King Muyeol and Munmyeong, who was the younger sister of Kim Yu-sin. Under his father's reign, he held the office of pajinchan, who apparently was responsible for maritime affairs, and played a key role in developing the country's diplomatic links with Tang China. He was born as Kim Pŏmmin and took the name Munmu when he succeeded his father to the throne. After his death, he was known by the title of Dragon King.

== Family ==
- Father: King Muyeol
- Mother: Queen Munmyeong (문명왕후; 文明王后) of the Gimhae Kim clan
- Spouse: Queen Jaeui, of the Kim clan (자의왕후 김씨; d.681)
  - Son: Kim So-myŏng (? – 665)
  - Son: Kim Chŏng-myŏng–who became King Sinmun, the 31st of Silla

== Unification of Three Kingdoms ==
King Munmu took the throne in the midst of a long conflict against Baekje and Goguryeo, shortly after General Kyebaek and Baekje had been defeated at Sabi by General Kim Yu-sin in 660. In these struggles, Silla was heavily aided by the Tang.

The first years of his reign were spent trying to defeat Goguryeo, following an abortive attempt in 661. Finally, in 667, he ordered another attack which led to the defeat of Goguryeo in 668. After the small isolated pockets of resistance were eliminated, Munmu was the first ruler ever to see the Korean Peninsula unified, although modern scholars, particularly those from North Korea question this notion. Many modern Korean scholars consider Goryeo as the first state to unify the Korean people as Silla failed to conquer parts of Goguryeo and Balhae in the northeast of the Korean Peninsula.

=== War with Tang China ===
King Munmu then faced the challenge of freeing his country from Tang domination. After the fall of Goguryeo, Tang created the Protectorate General to Pacify the East and attempted to place the entire Korean Peninsula, including Silla, under its rule. To prevent this, Munmu forged alliances with Goguryeo resistance leaders such as Geom Mojam and Anseung, and launched a frontal attack on the Tang forces occupying former Baekje territories. The struggle lasted through the early 670s.

In 674, Tang and its former ally, Silla, were in constant battle, as King Munmu had taken over much of former Baekje and Goguryeo territory from the Tang and fostered resistance against them. Emperor Gaozong, in anger, arbitrarily declared King Munmu's brother, Kim In-mun, as the king. However, King Munmu formally apologized and offered tribute, and Emperor Gaozong ordered a withdraw and recalled Kim In-mun.

In 675, Li Jinxing (Hanja:李謹行) reached Silla territory with Mohe forces that submitted to Tang. However, the Tang forces were defeated by the Silla army at the Maeso fortress.

Emperor Gaozong ordered withdrawal of Tang forces from the Korean Peninsula entirely and moved the Protectorate General to Pacify the East to Liaodong, allowing Silla to eventually expel Tang out of the Korean Peninsula and unify the parts of the peninsula south of the Taedong River. This victory, and the maintenance of Silla's independence, is generally regarded as a critical turning point in Korean history.

== After Unification Wars ==
Munmu ruled over unified Silla for twenty years, until he fell ill in 681. On his deathbed, he left his last will and testament, and abdicated to his son, Prince Sinmun. Before he died he said: "A country should not be without a king at any time. Let the Prince have my crown before he has my coffin. Cremate my remains and scatter the ashes in the sea where the whales live. I will become a dragon and thwart foreign invasion." King Sinmun did as his father asked, and scattered his ashes over Daewangam (the Rock of the Great King), a small rocky islet off the Korean coast. Moreover, King Sinmun built the Gomun Temple (the Temple of Appreciated Blessing) and dedicated it to his father, he built a waterway for the sea dragon to come to and from the sea and land, and he built a pavilion, Eegun, overlooking the islet so that future kings could pay their respects to the King Munmu.

In a dream, King Munmu and the general Kim Yu-sin appeared to King Sinmun and said to him: "Blowing on a bamboo flute will calm the heavens and the earth." King Sinmun awoke from the dream, rode out to the sea and received the bamboo flute named Manpa-sikjeok (萬波息笛, 만파식적). It was said that the blowing of this bamboo flute invoked the spirits of King Munmu and General Kim Yu-sin and would push back enemy troops, cure illnesses, bring rain during drought and halt the rains in floods.

== Ancestry ==
The Stele of Munmu Wang suggests that he was of the ethnic Xiongnu origin, or at least that parts of his family arrived from the Xiongnu.

Ancestors of Munmu of Silla

8. King Jinji of Silla
4. Kim Yong-su
9. Lady Jido of the Park clan
2. King Muyeol of Silla
10. King Jinpyeong of Silla
5. Princess Cheonmyeong of Silla
11. Queen Maya of Silla
1. King Munmu of Silla
12. General Kim Mu-tŭk
6. General Kim Sŏ-hyŏn
3. Munmyeong of the Kim clan
14. King Jinheung of Silla
7. Lady Manmyeong
15. Queen Sado of the Park clan

== Popular culture ==
- Portrayed by Baek Seung-hyeon in the 2006 SBS TV series Yeon Gaesomun.
- Portrayed by Moon Hee-won in the 2006 KBS TV series Dae Jo-yeong.
- Portrayed by Park Joo-hyeong in the 2011 MBC TV series Gyebaek.
- Portrayed by Lee Jong-soo in the 2012–2013 KBS1 TV series Dream of the Emperor.
- In the 2016 DC Comics comic book New Super-Man, King Munmu appears as the source of power for Ahn Kwang-jo, a North Korean refugee with powers over water bodies, able to summon sea creatures to aid.
- In the Korean webcomic The Gamer, he appears as the Dragon King of the Eastern Sea
- Portrayed by Yoon Hye Seok in the 2017 KBS TV series Chronicles of Korea

== See also ==
- History of Korea
- Silla–Tang Wars
- Three Kingdoms of Korea
- ROKS Munmu (DDH-976)
- Tomb of Munmu of Silla

Munmu of Silla House of Kim Born: 626 Died: 681
Regnal titles
Preceded by Muyeol	King of Silla; 661–681	Succeeded by Sinmun
