= Princess Cheonmyeong of Silla =

Korean princess

- Hangul: 천명공주
- Hanja: 天明公主
- RR: Cheonmyeong gongju
- MR: Ch'ŏnmyŏng kongju

Princess Cheonmyeong (Korean: 천명공주; Hanja: 天明公主; fl. 7th century) was a princess of Silla, one of the Three Kingdoms of Korea. She is known as Queen Seondeok's sister and King Taejong Muyeol's mother.

Princess Cheonmyeong was married to Kim Yongsu (son of King Jinji), with whom she had a son, Kim Chunchu. After Kim Chunchu was enthroned as a King of Silla, she was then given the posthumous name; Queen Dowager Munjeong.

== Biography ==
Princess Cheonmyeong was a daughter of King Jinpyeong and Queen Maya of Silla. Her sister, Queen Seondeok became the first female ruler of Korea. It is not clear which of them was older. According to the disputed text Hwarang Segi, Cheonmyeong was older than Seondeok.

It is said that Princess Cheonmyeong was in love with Kim Yongchu. When the talk of her marriage has come, Princess Cheonmyeong went to the Queen and told her (with tears on her eyes) that she cannot marry anyone else because there is already a man who owns her heart. Queen Maya asked her who that man is, Princess Cheonmyeong tried to say "Kim Yongchun" but because she was crying and stuttered on her reply, the Queen thought that she was talking about Kim Yongchu's brother "Kim Yongsu". Kim Yongsu was aware of Princess Cheonmyeong's feelings for his brother and decided to ask him to marry Princess Cheonmyeong on his stead. But Kim Yongchun refused out of respect for his brother who might end up a laughing stock since their wedding was already announced. The Queen tried to convinced him as well but he refused her as well with the same reason. And so, Princess Cheonmyeong and Kim Yongsu got married. But Princess Cheonmyeong wasn't able to forget her love even after years has passed. On his death bed, Kim Yongsu asked his brother once again to marry Princess Cheonmyeong and to take his son as his own as his dying wish. Kim Yongchun finally agreed and married Princess Cheonmyeong and took Kim Chunchu as his own. But this story is not mentioned in the historical texts Samguk sagi and Samguk yusa. This story is only mentioned in the disputed text Hwarang Segi.

After Kim Chunchu was crowned as the 29th king of Silla, Princess Cheonmyeong was named as Queen Dowager Munjeong.

== Family ==
- Father: King Jinpyeong (眞平王 진평왕 567–632)
- Mother: Kim Bokhilgu, the Lady Maya (金福肹口 摩耶夫人 김복힐구마야부인, dates unknown)

=== Siblings ===
- Princess Deokman, (later known as Queen Seondeok) (善德女王 선덕여왕, ? – 647) – it is debated whether Princess Cheonmyeong or Queen Seondeok was the elder sister
- Younger sister: Princess Seonhwa, 善花公主, 선화공주

=== In-laws ===
- Father in-law: 25th King of Silla, King Jinji (眞智王, 진지왕, ? – 579)
- Mother in-law: Lady Jido of the Park clan (知道夫人 朴氏, 지도부인 박씨, dates unknown)

=== Husband ===
- Kim Yongsu 金龍春 or金龍樹, 김용춘 or 김용수, 578~647. Late when Kim Chunchu became King Muyeol, he was known as Munheung the Great (文興大王, 문흥대왕)
- Kim Yongchun (김용춘; 金龍春), brother of Kim Yongsu; 13th Pungwolju of Silla.

=== Son ===
- Kim Chunchu, later known as King Muyeol, 金春秋 김춘추, 604-661

== In popular culture ==
- Portrayed by Lee Kyung-hwa in the 2005–2006 SBS TV series Ballad of Seodong.
- Portrayed by Park Ye-jin, Shin Se-kyung and Kim You-jung in the 2009 MBC TV series Queen Seondeok.
- Portrayed by Jo Kyung-sook in the 2012–2013 KBS TV series Dream of the Emperor.

== Sources ==
- 천명공주. Doosan Encyclopedia (in Korean).
