= Muyeol of Silla =

29th King of Silla (r. 654–661)

King Muyeol 무열왕 武烈王
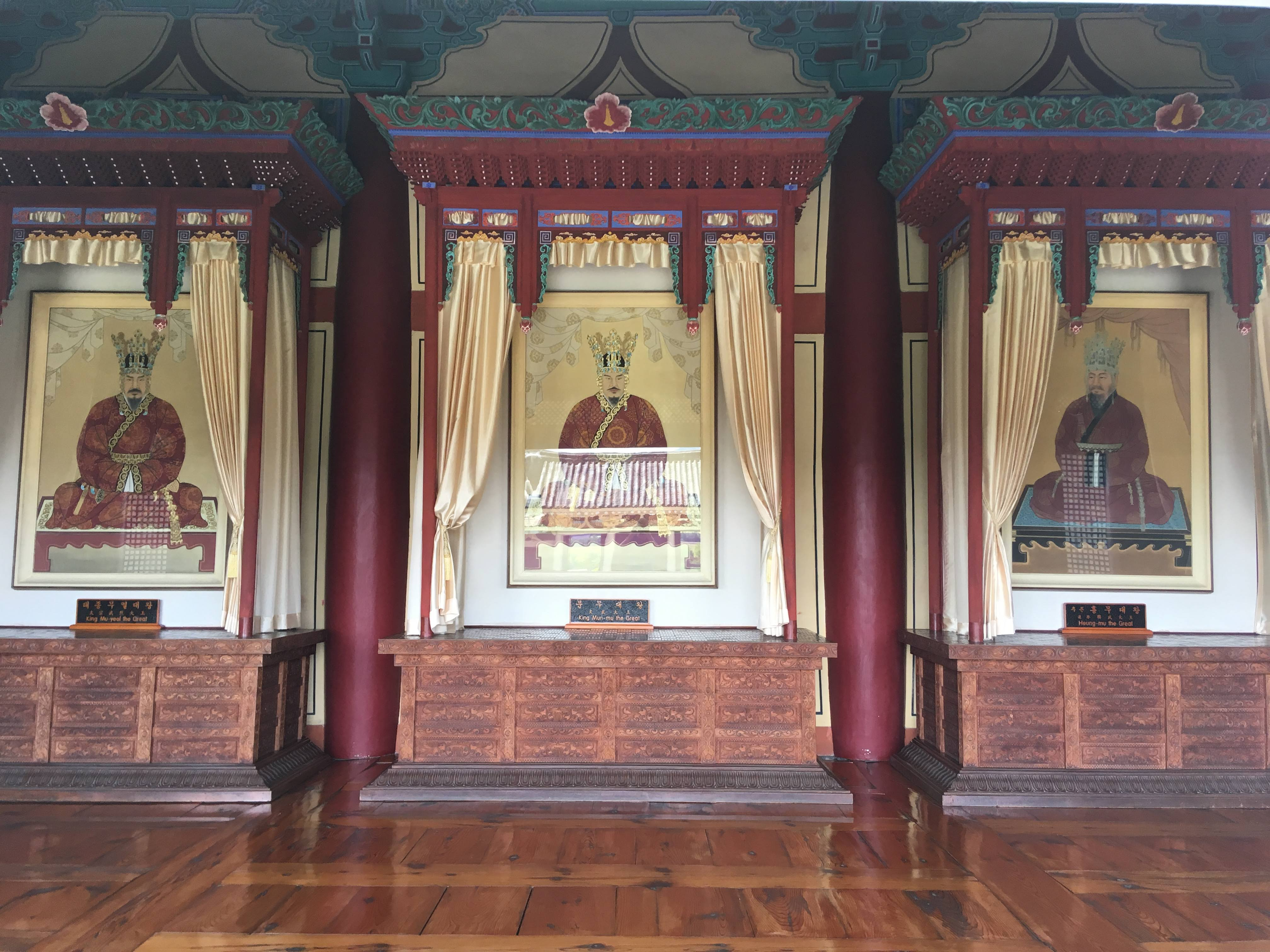
- A modern take on King Muyeol's visage.(left)

King of Silla
- Reign: 654–661
- Coronation: 647
- Predecessor: Jindeok of Silla
- Successor: Munmu of Unified Silla
- Born: 603; Gyeongju, North Gyeongsang Province, Silla
- Died: 661; Gyeongju, North Gyeongsang Province, Silla
- Burial: Yeonggyeong temple, Gyeongju
Posthumous name
- King Muyeol (武烈王, 무열왕)
Temple name
- Taejong (太宗, 태종)
- Father: Kim Yong-su
- Mother: Princess Cheonmyeong of Silla

- Muyeol of Silla
- Hangul: 김춘추
- Hanja: 金春秋
- RR: Gim Chunchu
- MR: Kim Ch'unch'u

Monarch name
- Hangul: 태종 무열왕
- Hanja: 太宗 武烈王
- RR: Taejong Muyeorwang
- MR: T'aejong Muyŏrwang

King Taejong Muyeol (603–661), born Kim Ch'un-ch'u, was the 29th ruler of Silla, one of the Three Kingdoms of Korea. He is credited for leading the unification of Korea's Three Kingdoms.

== Background ==
King Taejong Muyeol was born with the "sacred bone" rank of seonggol. His father, Kim Yongsu (Korean: 김용수; Hanja: 金龍樹), was a son of Silla's 25th ruler, King Jinji. When King Jinji was overthrown, all royalty from his line, including Kim Yong-su, were deemed unfit to rule over the kingdom. However, as Yong-su was one of the few remaining seonggols, and married a seonggol princess (King Jinpyeong's daughter Princess Cheonmyeong), their child, Kim Ch'un-ch'u, became seonggol and thus had a claim to the throne. Kim Yong-su was a powerful figure in the government; however, he lost all of his power to Kim Paek-ban, the brother of the king. In order to survive, he accepted to become a jingol, the rank that was right below seonggol, therefore removing the right of becoming the king for him and his son, Kim Ch'un-ch'u. Following the death of his aunt, Queen Seondeok, Ch'un-ch'u was passed over in favor of Jindeok of Silla, the last verifiable seonggol. With her death, all the seonggols were dead, so somebody with the royal blood in the jinggol rank had to succeed the throne. Alcheon, who then held the title Sangdaedeung, or highest post of government, of Silla was the original favorite to succeed the throne. His father was a seonggol, who married a jingol woman so that his son would not be a seonggol and suffer from the fight for the throne. However, Kim Yu-sin supported Kim Ch'un-ch'u, and Alcheon eventually refused the throne and supported Ch'un-ch'u's claim. As a result, Kim Ch'un-ch'u succeeded the throne as King Muyeol.

== Marriage to Kim Yu-sin's sister ==
Kim Yu-sin had two sisters: Bo-hee and Mun-hee. Bo-hee was a shy girl with a delicate appearance, while Mun-hee was a tall and outgoing girl. Kim Yu-sin had always hoped for one of his sisters to be married to Kim Ch'un-ch'u.

One day, Kim Ch'un-ch'u went to Kim Yu-sin's house for a game of dakyu (Korean: 격구, romanized: geogku, traditional Korean polo). During the game, Kim Yu-sin deliberately tore off one of the tassels on Kim Ch'un-ch'u's robe. Kim Yu-sin offered to have it sewn by one of his sisters; he then sent for Bohee to have it mend, but she was too nervous to come into the presence of a stranger, and politely refused by saying that "she cannot do something so small for someone so precious". Munhee stepped out and offered to sew it instead. When they met, Kim Ch'un-ch'u and Munhee fell in love with each other. Kim Ch'un-ch'u started to visit Munhee more often, but Kim Yu-sin pretended not to be aware of their relationship. Eventually, Munhee became pregnant, however, Kim Ch'un-ch'u decided to keep it a secret in fear of causing trouble since he was already a married man. When Kim Yu-sin found out about it, he scolded his sister severely, then ordered their servants to spread the rumor of his sister's pregnancy and that he might kill her because of it in a plan to pressure Kim Ch'un-ch'u into marrying his sister.

Not long afterwards, Queen Seondeok decided to take a walk with her officials on the mountain Namsan. When he heard of it, Kim Yu-sin made a pile of dry logs and twigs in the garden outside of his house and set it on fire for the Queen to see. High up on the mountain, the Queen noticed the black smoke that was coming from Yushin's residence area, and asked those accompanying her if they knew the reason. No one dared to answer her, but simply looked at one another in embarrassment. When the Queen pressed on the issue, she finally learned from them about the rumor of Munhee's pregnancy out of wedlock and that Kim Yu-sin might burn her to death because of it. She was astonished with what they said and wondered "Who could the father be, to make Kim Yu-sin act like that". She then noticed the anxious look on Kim Ch'un-ch'u's face and asked if he knew anything about it. After the truth was revealed, the Queen ordered him to go and save Munhee's life by granting him the permission to marry her as his second wife, to become his lawful spouse when his first wife died.

Munhee officially became his wife after Kim Ch'un-ch'u's wife (Boryang) died of childbirth with their second child. She became his queen after he was crowned as the 29th King of Silla on year 654. Their child grew up to be King Munmu, who completed the unification of The Three Kingdoms of Korea, 29 years after Queen Seondeok's death. Kim Yu-sin became the most powerful man in the court during King Muyeol's reign and eventually became a Sangdaedeung, six years later. His sister Bohee also became one of King Muyeol's wives.

== Reign ==
He was well acquainted with the Emperor Gaozong of the Tang dynasty, for he and the Emperor were friends before Gaozong became an Emperor. King Muyeol was a great support to the Emperor, and the Emperor returned the support to King Muyeol. He constantly pleaded with the Tang for reinforcements to destroy Baekje, to which the Tang finally acquiesced in 660, sending 130,000 troops under General Su Dingfang. Meanwhile, Kim Yu-sin set out from Silla with 50,000 soldiers and fought the bloody Battle of Hwangsanbeol leaving Baekje devastated and unprotected. King Uija of Baekje finally surrendered, leaving only Goguryeo to face Silla as an adversary on the Korean peninsula.

In June of the following year King Muyeol died, leaving his son Munmu of Silla to assume the throne.

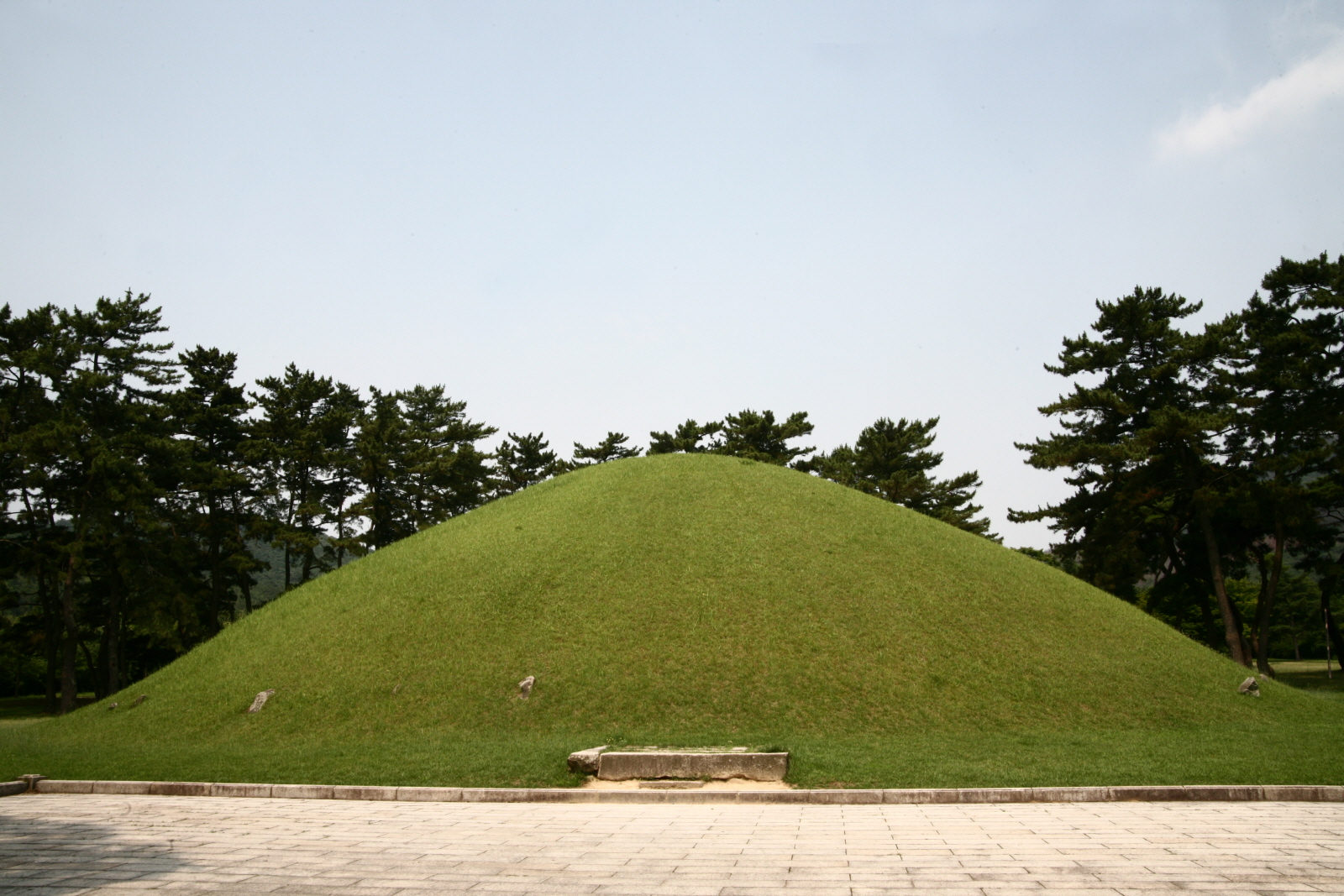
Muyeol's tomb in Gyeongju

His tomb is currently located in Gyeongju. It is the only Silla-era tomb for which the owner's identity is known with certainty.

== Family ==
Parents

- Father: Kim Yong-su (Hanja: 金龍春 or金龍樹, Hangul 김용춘 or 김용수)( 578–647)
  - Grandfather: King Jinji of Silla
  - Grandmother: Lady Jido of the Bak clan (지도부인 박씨; 知道夫人 朴氏)
- Mother: Princess Cheonmyeong (천명공주; 天明公主)
  - Grandfather: King Jinpyeong of Silla
  - Grandmother: Queen Maya

Consorts and their respective issue:

1. Princess Bora (보라궁주; 寶羅宮主) of the Gyeongju Seol clan (설씨)
  1. Lady Gotaso (627 – 642) (고타소랑, Hanja: 古陀炤娘)
  2. Second daughter
2. Queen Munmyeong (문명왕후; 文明王后) of the Gimhae Gim clan
  1. King Munmu of Silla (626 – 681)
  2. Kim In-mun (629 – 694)
  3. Lady Jiso (지소부인; 智炤夫人)
3. Kim Po-hui (김보희; 金寶姬), Lady Yeonchang (영창부인) of the Gimhae Kim clan
  1. Kim Kaejimun (김개지문; 金皆知文)
  2. Kim Cha-tŭk (김차득; 金車得)
  3. Kim Ma-tŭk (김마득; 金馬得)
  4. Princess Yoseok (요석공주; 瑤石公主)
  5. Kim In-t'ae (김인태; 金仁泰)
4. Unknown consorts
  1. Kim Mun-wang (김문왕; 金文王; 629 – 665)
  2. Kim No-ch'a (김노차; 金老且)
  3. Kim Chi-gyŏng (김지경; 金智鏡)
  4. Kim Kae-wŏn (김개원; 金愷元)

== Ancestry ==
Ancestors of Muyeol of Silla

16. (=26.)Prince Ipjong
8. (=24.)King Jinheung of Silla
17. (=27.)Lady Sikdo of the Kim clan
4. King Jinji of Silla
18. Pak Yŏng-sil
9. (=25.)Queen Sado of the Bak clan
19. Palace Lady Okjin
2. Kim Yong-su
5. Lady Jido of the Bakk clan
1. King Muyeol of Silla
24. (=8.)King Jinheung of Silla
12. Crown Prince Dongryun
25. (=9.)Queen Sado of the Bak clan
6. King Jinpyeong of Silla
26. (=16.)Prince Ipjong
13. Lady Mano of the Kim clan
27. (=17.)Lady Sikdo of the Kim clan
3. Princess Cheonmyeong
28. Lord Sanjong
14. Galmunwang Bokseung
29. Sadomi
7. Queen Maya
30. Pak Yŏng-sil
15. Princess Songhwa
31. Queen Dowager Jiso

== Popular culture ==
- Portrayed by Lee Ho-seong in 2003 movie Once Upon a Time in a Battlefield.
- Portrayed by Kim Byung-se in the 2006 SBS TV series Yeon Gaesomun.
- Portrayed by Yoo Seung-ho and Jung Yun-seok in the 2009 MBC TV series Queen Seondeok.
- Portrayed by Lee Dong-kyu in the 2011 MBC TV series Gyebaek.
- Portrayed by Choi Soo-jong and Chae Sang-woo in the 2012–2013 KBS1 TV series Dream of the Emperor.
- Portrayed by Park Jun-hyuk in the 2017 KBS TV series Chronicles.

== See also ==
- History of Korea
- Rulers of Korea
- Bone rank system

Muyeol of Silla House of Kim Born: 604 Died: 661
Regnal titles
Preceded by Jindeok	King of Silla; 654–661	Succeeded by Munmu
