= Queen Maya of Silla =

Royal member

- Queen Maya
- Hangul: 마야 부인
- Hanja: 摩耶夫人
- RR: Maya buin
- MR: Maya puin

Queen Maya (Korean: 마야 부인; Hanja: 摩耶夫人) was a member of the Silla royal house and the wife and queen consort to King Jinpyeong of Silla, 26th King of Silla. She was of the royal Kim clan. She was the mother of Queen Seondeok of Silla.

The name of Queen Maya is derived from Queen Maya (摩耶夫人), the mother of Siddhartha Gautama (Shakyamuni Buddha). During the reign of King Beopheung, Buddhism became officially recognized, and as a result, names for the Silla royalty began to incorporate Buddhist elements and meanings. Although Queen Maya and King Jinpyeong had four daughters and no sons, the existence of two of their daughters, Sunhwa and Cheonhwa, remains uncertain.

== Genealogy ==
=== Ancestors ===
Ancestors of Queen Maya of Silla

16. Jabi Maripgan (慈悲麻立干 자비마립간); 20th King of Silla
8. Soji Maripgan (炤知麻立干 소지마립간); 21st King of Silla
17. Lady Paho; 巴胡夫人 (파호부인)
4. Lord Sanjong; 山宗公 (산종공)
18. Park Deungheun; 朴登欣 (박등흔)
9. Lady Yeonje; 延帝夫人 (연제부인)
2. Bokseung (福勝 복승); Galmunwang (葛文王 갈문왕)
20. Jijeung (智證王 지증왕); 22nd King of Silla
10. Beopheung (法興王 법흥왕); 23rd King of Silla
21. Lady Yeonje (= #9); 延帝夫人 (연제부인)
5. Sadomi; 沙道美 (사도미)
11. Saryong; 沙龍 (사룡)
1. Kim Bokhilgu (金福肹口 김복힐구); Lady Maya (摩耶夫人 마야부인)
12. Lord Suji; 守知公 (수지공)
6. Park Yeongsil; 朴英失 (박영실)
26. Jijeung (智證王 지증왕) (= #20); 22nd King of Silla
13. Princess Bohyeon; 普賢公主 (보현공주)
27. Lady Yeonje (= #9); 延帝夫人 (연제부인)
3. Princess Songhwa; 松華公主 / 松花公主 (송화공주)
28. Jijeung (智證王 지증왕) (= #20); 22nd King of Silla
14. Beopheung (法興王 법흥왕) (= #10); 23rd King of Silla
29. Lady Yeonje (= #9); 延帝夫人 (연제부인)
7. Dowager Queen Jiso; 只召太后 (지소태후)
30. Soji Maripgan (炤知麻立干 소지마립간) (= #8); 21st King of Silla
15. Lady Bodo; 保道夫人 / 保刀夫人 (보도부인)
31. Lady Seonhye; 善兮夫人 (선혜부인)

== Family ==
- For the lineage from Lady Maya's parents upwards, refer to the ancestry chart above
- Siblings:
1. Lord Horim (虎林公 호림공; 579-?), 14th Pungwolju (603–609)
2. Lady Horin (護璘夫人 호린부인)
- Husband: King Jinpyeong
- Issue:
1. Princess Cheonmyeong (天明公主 천명공주, dates unknown), 1st daughter
2. Princess Deokman (德曼公主 덕만공주), 2nd daughter
3. Princess Seonhwa (善花/化公主 선화공주, dates unknown), 3rd daughter (There is constant debate over her identity.)

== In popular culture ==
- Portrayed by Kim Hwa-ran in the 2005–2006 SBS TV series Ballad of Seodong.
- Portrayed by Yoon Yoo-sun and Park Soo-jin in the 2009 MBC TV series Queen Seondeok.
- Portrayed by Im Nan-hyung in the 2012–2013 KBS1 TV series Dream of the Emperor.
