= Jinpyeong of Silla =

26th monarch of Silla (r. 579–632)

King Jinpyeong 진평왕 眞平王
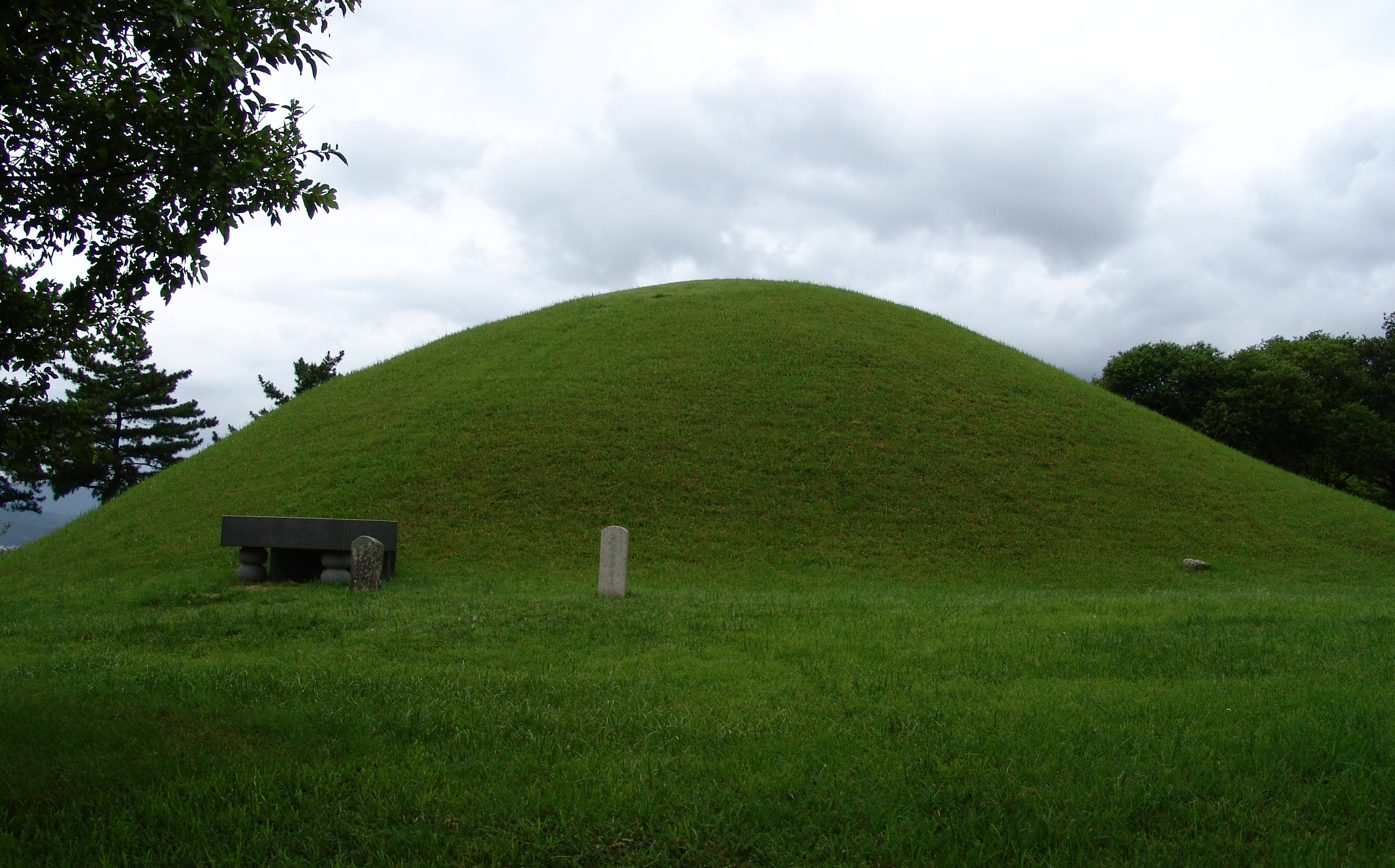
- Royal tomb of King Jinpyeong in Gyeongju

King of Silla
- Reign: 579 – 632
- Coronation: 579
- Predecessor: King Jinji
- Successor: Queen Seondeok
- Born: 567?
- Died: 632 (aged 64–65)
- Burial: Gyeongju, Gyeongsang Province
- Spouse: Queen Maya
- Issue: Queen Seondeok; Princess Cheonmyeong; Princess Seonhwa
Posthumous name
- King Jinpyeong (眞平王, 진평왕)
- House: House of Kim
- Father: Crown Prince Dongryun
- Mother: Lady Mano of the Kim clan

- Jinpyeong of Silla
- Hangul: 김백정
- Hanja: 金白淨
- RR: Gim Baekjeong
- MR: Kim Paekchŏng

Monarch name
- Hangul: 진평왕
- Hanja: 眞平王
- RR: Jinpyeongwang
- MR: Chinp'yŏngwang

Jinpyeong (Korean: 진평; 567? – 632, reign 579 – 632) was the 26th king of Silla, one of the Three Kingdoms of Korea. King Jinpyeong followed in the footsteps of his predecessor, King Jinji, by reorganizing the central ruling system of Silla. Upon the onset of a multitude of conflicts between Baekje and Goguryeo, he sent emissaries to improve relations and strengthen ties between Silla and the Chinese dynasties Sui and Tang. He is also known for his promotion of Buddhism as a spiritual guide for the kingdom and encouraging Buddhist teachings. His 54 year long reign is the longest in Silla's history.

== Life ==
King Jinpyeong was born as Kim Baek-Jeong. His father, Crown Prince Dongryun, was the first son of King Jinheung. And his mother, Lady Mano, was the daughter of Galmunwang, Kim Reep Jong. The Samguk sagi describes King Jinpyeong as someone: big in stature, has a notable face and possessed great determination and sharp intellect as a youth. His father, Prince Dongryun, died before being able to ascend the throne. Four years later, King Jinheung died, his second son, King Jinji ascended the throne and became the 25th King of Silla. After 3 years, King Jinji was overthrown and eventually died a year after, King Jinpyeong was then proclaimed as Silla's 26th ruler. He married Queen Maya, the daughter of Galmunwang Bokseung, they had three daughters: Princess Cheonmyeong, Princess Deokman and Princess Seonhwa. He also had children with his concubines. Samguk yusa says that he had another wife after Queen Maya, she's called Lady Seungnam who later on became his second Queen. According to Hwarang Segi, after Princess Deokman was nominated as King Jinpyeong's successor, Queen Seungnam gave birth to a son which put Princess Deokman's status as a successor at stake. However, her son died shortly for unknown reason. Queen Seungnam blamed Princess Deokman and Kim Yongchun for the death of her child. It is said that she was forced to leave the palace because of her severe jealousy which caused disturbance to the palace. Princess Deokman became the 27th ruler of Silla after him. Princess Cheonmyeong's son, became the 29th ruler of Silla. According to the Samguk yusa, his third daughter Princess Seonhwa, married King Mu of Baekje. (Historians considered this unlikely, given the hostilities between the rival kingdoms.)

== Reign ==
Since King Jinpyeong was only 13 years old when he ascended the throne, Queen Dowager Sado, served as a regent until he reached the legal age. However, Queen Sado still refused to give him full control of Silla even after he reached the legal age. She appointed Noribu, as the Sangdaedeung and Hujik as the head of the Military. Noribu died on December of 588, Sueulbu became the next Sangdaedeung after him. King Jinpyeong relied heavily on these two chief officials to solidify his kingdom in both internal affairs and international relations. He also gave the rank of Galmunwang to his brothers Baekban and Gukban, to solidify his power in the court.

King Jinpyeong's achievement was the way he strengthened the Kingdom and improved the political system. He named himself, his wife and his younger siblings as people related to the Buddha which eventually made the entire royal family being seen as an especial household for the throne, completely different compared to the rest of the royal nobles.

He also built different departments for different political purposes, such as: The Ministry of Culture and Tourism and the Ministry of Education.

Buddhism was embraced during this era, as King Jinpyeong actively sent envoys and monks to China to study and help in diplomatic relations. Buddhism in Silla developed as a strong, nation-protecting religion.

Year 594, King Jinpyeong sent a diplomat to Sui dynasty of China in order to establish a diplomatic relationship between their countries. Two years later, he sent Monk Damyook to Sui in order to study Chinese Buddhism.

Year 602, Amak Fortress was invaded by Baekje forces led by General Hae Su. As a result, King Jinpyeong sent thousands of soldiers to fight them back and built fortresses in Cheonsan, Sota and Wae Seok. However, King Mu of Baekje fought back by sending 40,000 troops to attack the said fortresses. Silla sent General Gunpoom and Mu Eun to fight them back. During the battle, Mu Eun fell into Hae Su's ambush and almost got killed but was saved by his son Gwisan and Chu Hang, however the two were both killed in the battle. The bravery they have shown in their death raised the morale of Silla's army as a result, Baekje forces had no other choice but to retreat.

Year 603, King Yeongyang of Goguryeo sent his General, Go Seung to attack the north side of Han Fortress. And so, King Jinpyeong retaliated by leading the army himself with 10,000 troops and succeeded.

Year 605, Silla attacked Baekje. However, Goguryeo attacked them as a result.

Year 608, King Jinpyeong ordered Monk Won-Gwang to write a letter to the Sui dynasty, asking them for assistance to attack Goguryeo, knowing that the Emperor of Sui wasn't happy about Goguryeo's refusal of paying tributes. When King Yeongyang heard of it, he attacked Silla and took over Woo Myeong fortress and captured 8,000 people of Silla.

Year 611, King Jinpyeong asked Sui again to attack Goguryeo again. July of the same year, Kajam fortress was invaded by the Baekje. The next year, Emperor Yang of Sui decided to attack Goguryeo with more than 1 million troops. However, Sui lost and retreated just few months after the attack. The Emperor of the Sui dynasty continued to attack Goguryeo for the next 3 years out embarrassment for their lost, but still ended up in failure.

Year 616, Baekje attacked Mosan Fortress but retreated right away.

Year 618, the Sui dynasty has fallen and was succeeded by the Tang dynasty. That same year, King Jinpyeong ordered Byeon Poom to take back Kajam fortress from the Baekje but failed to do so. After that loss, King Jinpyeong sent a diplomat to the new dynasty of Tang, in order to establish a diplomatic relationship between their countries.

Year 623, Baekje attacked Neuk Noh of Silla.

Year 624, Baekje surrounded 6 fortresses of Silla. General Nool Choi fought back bravely but was only able to take back 3 of those fortresses.

Year 625, King Jipyeong sent a messenger to Tang and told them that Goguryeo was blocking Silla's route from paying tributes to Tang. Emperor Taizong of Tang, asked Goguryeo to stop attacking Silla, which the King of Goguryeo heed to.

Year 626, Baekje conquered Jujae fortress of Silla and killed the official of Dong So. Silla decided to build Go Hyeo fortress to prepare for the future attack.

Year 627, General Sa Gyeol of Baekje, took 2 fortresses from the western part of Silla and capture its residence.

Year 628, Silla succeeded in taking Kajam fortress back.

Year 629, Kim Yongsu and Kim Seo Hyun, conquered Nangbi fortress of Goguryeo.

Because of non-stop wars against the Baekje and Goguryeo, Silla became very poor and resulted to famine. Many families sold their children and lands.

May of 631, Chilseok and Seokpum planned a rebellion but their plan was discovered early and, as a result, Chilseok was beheaded in the marketplace along with his entire family. Seokpum was able to escape and run all the way to the Baekje border but the thought of his wife made him come back after exchanging clothes with a woodcutter, he was then arrested by the soldiers that were waiting for him at his house and was executed later on. On that same year, King Jinpyeong sent two beautiful women from Silla to the emperor of Tang, but they were sent back to Silla.

Year 632, King Jinpyeong died aged 66 after reigning Silla for 53 years. He was succeeded by his daughter Kim Deokman, who became Queen Seondeok later on, the first female ruler of Korea.

== Reforms ==
King Jinpyeong continued to restructure and reorganize during his reign; in 581 he set up Wihwabu (위화부; 位和府), an administrative department for managing government officials and personnel, and in 583 Seonbuseo (선부서; 船府署), a department for the management of the country's navy. He established an independent era reign name in 584, the department Jobu (조부; 調府) to oversee taxes and obligatory labor, and Seungbu (승부; 乘府) to manage transport wagons and coaches. Three officials were appointed to manage the major three palaces in 585, and in 586 the department Yebu (예부; 禮部) was established to oversee rituals and ceremonies. In 588, he placed Ichan Sueulbu (이찬 수을부, hanja 伊飡 首乙夫) as the highest government official of Sangdaedeung, and a special department that looked after foreign diplomats, Younggaekbu (영객부; 領客府), was set up in 591.

The King also made reforms in the regional counties and prefecture system. A new district, Bukhansanju (북한산주; 北漢山州), was created in preparation against attacks from Goguryeo in 604, and in 614 Ilseonju (일선주; 一善州) was formed in preparation against Baekje.

In 622, King Jinji's son Kim Yong Chun was appointed as the first Naeseongsasin (내성사신; 內省私臣), the official who managed the three major palaces. The reforms continued with the department of the Palace Guards Siwibu (시위부; 侍衛府); the department Sangsaseo (상사서; 賞賜署), which looked after national heroes and their families; and Daedoseo (대도서; 大道署) which oversaw affairs regarding Buddhism.

=== Buddhism and relations with China ===
King Jinpyeong was a fervent advocate for Buddhism, and many monks made travels to China during his rule while serving diplomatic roles. The monk Jimyeong (지명; 智明) who went to China's Chen dynasty in 585 to study Buddhism returned in 602 with emissaries, and the monk Wongwang (원광; 圓光), who had gone to study in China in 589, also returned with emissaries in 600. The monk Damyuk (담육; 曇育) also went to study under the Sui dynasty in 596, with emissaries and gifts sent from King Jinpyeong.

These emissaries to China including Buddhist monks were continuously sent during King Jinpyeong's reign, and the two countries remained on amicable terms. In 608, when Silla was under attack from Baekje and Goguryeo, King Jinpyeong asked for the Sui's aid, with requests written by the monk Wongwang. Sui complied and joined forces with Silla in their attacks of Goguryeo, and in 613 Emperor Yang of Sui sent emissaries to Silla who participated in Buddhist ceremonies held by Monk Wongwang at Hwangnyong Temple.

Diplomatic relations with China continued throughout the Sui dynasty and the following Tang dynasty. Gifts were sent with emissaries to Tang in 621 and the Emperor Gaozu sent silks, folding screens of art with an official statement in return. These diplomatic relations continued in the following years and Silla used this relation for asking for Tang's assistance against Goguryeo. Emperor Gaozu of Tang sent governors to both Silla and Goguryeo in 626 to bring about a truce between the two countries, albeit briefly.

=== Conflicts with Baekje and Goguryeo ===
Although King Jinpyeong focused on reinforcing defense by building forts and fortresses and strengthening the military system, Silla was in constant conflict with its two neighbors, Baekje and Goguryeo. In 602, Baekje troops attacked the fortress Amak (아막성; 阿莫城) but were turned back, and in 603 Gogguryeo attacked the fortress at Bukhansan (북한산성; 北漢山城) but were defeated when King Jinpyeong himself joined the battle.

Baekje continued with their attacks in 605, as did Goguryeo. King Jinpyeong sent the monk Wongwang to Sui with a request for aid against these attacks in 608. The aid from Sui came after Silla had lost many people and fortresses, and ultimately the joined forces failed in deterring Goguryeo attacks.

Conflicts with Baekje escalated in 611, when they attacked the fortress of Gajam (가잠성; 椵岑城) and claimed it after a brutal battle of 100 days. Ongoing attacks included one on the fortress of Mosan (모산성; 母山城) in 616, Neuknohyeon (늑노현; 勒弩縣) in 623, and the three fortresses of Sokham (속함성; 速含城), Gijam (기잠성; 歧暫城), and Hyeolchaek (혈책성; 穴柵城)in 624.

In 626 Baekje attacked the fortress of Jujae (주재성; 主在城), and two additional fortresses were taken with many people taken hostage in 627. In 628, Silla defeated Baekje at the fortress of Gajam and in 629 generals Kim Yong Chun (김용춘), Kim Seo Hyeon (김서현), and Kim Yushin (김유신) conquered Goguryeo's fortress Nangbi (낭비성; 娘臂城).

=== Later reign ===
The continuous battles with Baekje and Goguryeo took its toll on Silla and its people. Drought, famine, and disquiet spread through the country. The ruling nobility frequently held conflicting political views; when King Jinpyeong designated his daughter Princess Deokman as his heir the division grew even deeper, as many nobles were opposed to the idea of having a queen.

Political dissension reached its peak in May 631, when Ichan Chilsuk (이찬 칠숙) and Achan Seokpum (아찬 석품) plotted an uprising based on their opposition to having Princess Deokman as their next ruler. The revolt was discovered in advance and was stopped by Alcheon and Bidam; Chilsuk was beheaded in public and his relatives executed. Although Seokpum was able to escape, he later returned and was eventually captured and killed. With the rebellion put down, power was left mainly in the hands of the King's supporters (the most important of them was Kim Yushin, Commander in Chief of the Royal Army from 629), and it was in this political atmosphere that Princess Deokman was able to become Queen.

King Jinpyeong died in January 632, in the 54th year of his reign. He is buried in Bomun-dong, Gyeongju. His tomb was designated a historical landmark by the Korean government in 1969.

== Anecdote ==
=== The King's Jade Belt ===
There is a story about King Jinpyeong's jade belt in the history Samguk yusa, in which the belt is said to have been given by the heavens. In 579, when King Jinpyeong ascended to the throne, angels landed on the palace gardens and gave King Jinpyeong a gift from the Jade Emperor. King Jinpyeong always wore this belt in rituals and ceremonies in honor of the heavens. Along with the 9 story pagoda and statue of Buddha at the temple Hwangnyongsa, the jade belt is considered one of the three main treasures of Silla. After the fall of Silla, King Gyeongsun gave the belt to Goryeo's Taejo. According to this legend, King Jinpyeong was 11 feet (about 253 cm) tall.

=== The Fire of Mojiak ===
The first record of coal in Korea is in the Samguk sagi, where there is a description of a "fire burning under the ground of Mojiak (모지악; 毛只嶽) for 9 months during the reign of King Jinpyeong in the year 609". It is assumed that Mojiak is the present region of Youngil, North Gyeongsang Province, where brown coal is excavated.

== Family ==
- Father: Crown Prince Dongryun (동륜태자), son of King Jinheung
- Mother: Lady Mano, family name Kim (만호부인 김씨)
- Brother: Galmunwang Baekban (백반 갈문왕)
- Brother: Galmunwang Gukban (국반 갈문왕)
  - Niece: Princess Seungman (승만공주), later Queen Jindeok

=== Wives and issue ===
- Queen: Queen Maya (마야부인; 摩耶夫人). Family name Kim, daughter of Galmunwang Bokseung (복승갈문왕; 福勝葛文王) and Princess Songhwa (송화공주; 松華公主)
  - Daughter: Princess Deokman (덕만공주; 德曼公主). Becomes Queen Seondeok in 632.
  - Daughter: Princess Cheonmyeong (천명공주; 天明公主). Future Queen Mother Munjeong (문정태후), wife of Kim Yongsu, mother of King Muyeol
  - Daughter: Princess Seonhwa (선화공주; 善花公主; 善化公主). Married of King Mu of Baekje, mother of King Uija of Baekje (There is constant debate over her identity.)
- Second Queen: Queen Seungman, family name Sohn (승만부인)
- Concubine: Lady Mishil
  - Daughter: Princess Bohwa (보화공주; 寶華公主)
- Concubine: Lady Boryang of the Seol clan (보량궁주 설씨; 604 – 670)
  - Son: Prince Borojeon (보로전군; 寶路殿君)
- Concubine: Princess Bomyeong (보명궁주), daughter of Queen Jiso and Gu Jin

== In popular culture ==
- Portrayed by Park Woong in the 1992 KBS TV series Samgukgi.
- Portrayed by Choi Dong-joon in the 2005–2006 SBS TV series Ballad of Seodong.
- Portrayed by Cha Du-ok in the 2006 SBS TV series Yeon Gaesomun.
- Portrayed by Jo Min-ki, Baek Jong-min and Kang San in the 2009 MBC TV series Queen Seondeok.
- Portrayed by Kim Ha-kyun in the 2012 KBS TV series Dream of the Emperor.

== Notes ==
Jinpyeong of Silla House of Kim Born: c. 567 Died: 632
Regnal titles
Preceded by Jinji	King of Silla; 579–632	Succeeded by Seondeok
