= Queen Jaui =

Queen consort of Silla
- Predecessor: Queen Munmyeong
- Successor: Deposed Queen Kim; Queen Sinmok
- Died: 681; Silla
- Spouse: Kim Beob-min, Munmu of Silla
- Issue: Crown Prince Somyeong; Kim Jeong-myeong, Sinmun of Silla
- House: Gyeongju Kim
- Father: Kim Seon-pom
- Mother: Princess Boryong

Queen Jaui (Korean: 자의왕후 김씨; Hanja: 慈儀王后 金氏; d. 681) or Queen Janul (Korean: 자눌왕후; Hanja: 慈訥王后), of the Gyeongju Kim clan, was a Korean queen consort. She was the spouse of king Munmu of Silla. She was a first cousin once removed of Queen Seondeok and Princess Cheonmyeong.

== Family ==
- Father - Lord Kim Seon-pom (김선품; 金善品; 607 – 643)
- Mother - Princess Boryong (보룡궁주 김씨)
- Sibling(s)
  - Brother - Kim Su-won (김순원; 金順元)
    - Niece - Queen Sodeok of the Gyeongju Kim clan (소덕왕후 김씨)
      - Nephew-in-law - Kim Yong-gi, King Seongdeok of Silla (성덕왕; ? – 737); was the 33rd King of Silla
    - Niece - Queen Hyemyeong of the Gyeongju Kim clan (혜명왕후 김씨)
      - Nephew-in-law - Kim Seung-gyeong, King Hyoseong of Silla (효성왕; ? – 742); was the 34th King of Silla
  - Younger sister - Kim Woon-myeong (김운명; 金雲明), Lady Kim of the Gyeongju Kim clan
  - Younger sister - Princess Yamyeong of the Gyeongju Kim clan (야명궁주 김씨)
- Husband - Kim Beob-min, Munmu of Silla (문무왕; 626 – 21 July 681)
- Issue
  - Son - Crown Prince Somyeong (소명태자)
  - Son - Kim Jeong-myeong, Sinmun of Silla (신문왕; ? – 692); was the 31st King of Silla
    - Daughter-in-law - Deposed Queen Kim of the Gyeongju Kim clan (폐비 김씨)
    - Daughter-in-law - Queen Sinmok of the Gyeongju Kim clan (신목왕후 김씨; 655 – 700)
      - Grandson - Kim Yi-hong, King Hyoso of Silla (효소왕; 687 – 702); was the 32nd monarch of Silla
      - Grandson - Kim Yong-gi, King Seongdeok of Silla (성덕왕; ? – 737); was the 33rd King of Silla
      - Grandson - Kim Geun-jil (김근질; 金根質)
      - Grandson - Kim Sa–jong (김사종; 金詞宗)

== Popular culture ==
- Portrayed by Choi Kyu-Hyeon in the 2012 KBS TV series Dream of the Emperor
