= Sangdaedŭng =

Office of the Silla state in Korea

Sangdaedŭng (Korean: 상대등; Hanja: 上大等, the First of Taedŭngs or Peers, Extraordinary Rank One) or Sangsin (상신; 上臣), was an office of the Silla state. The Sangdaedŭng was the head of the Council of Nobles and was considered as the highest and most prestigious office that one could attain next to the throne itself. The position was established during King Beophung's 18th year as a king (531) and survived until the end of Silla.

== Selection ==
The Sangdaedŭng was chosen from among those men of "true bone" (진골; 眞骨) lineage in Silla's strict aristocratic social order. He presided over the Hwabaek Council (화백; 和白), an advisory and decision-making committee composed of other high-ranking officials holding the office of Taedŭng (대등; 大等). The council's primary duties lay in rendering decisions on important state matters, such as succession to the throne and declarations of war. Its existence dated back to the early Silla state and reflected that state's tribal origins. Throughout Silla history the Hwabaek Council led by the Sangdaedŭng served as a check on the king's authority.

During the middle period of Silla, following that state's unification of the peninsula, the focus of government authority shifted from the Hwabaek Council and Sangdaedŭng to the Chancellery Office (Jipsabu, 집사부; 執事部) and its Chief Minister (Sijung, 시중; 侍中, or alternately Jungsi, 중시; 中侍), an office instituted in Silla in 651 as the highest organ in the central government apparatus. This reflected the monarchy's efforts to curb the power of an independent nobility by relying on the Chinese inspired Jipsabu rather than the Hwabaek Council, whose existence was predicated on age old aristocratic and clan prerogatives. In the wake of several challenges to his authority King Sinmun dared even execute the Sangdaedŭng Gungwan in 681 for complicity in the revolt of Kim Hŭmdol (김흠돌; 金欽突).

Despite these attempts to limit its power, the office of Sangdaedŭng remained until the end of Silla the highest and most prestigious office one could attain short of the throne itself. In the later period of Silla, during which the throne was continuously contested, several monarchs emerged from the office of Sangdaedŭng.

== List of Sangdaedŭng ==
Monarch	Name			Years in Service	Ref
Monarch	Romanized	Hangul	Hanja	Years in Service	Ref
Beopheung	Ch'ŏlbu	철부	哲夫	531–534	
Beopheung/Jinheung?	Kim Guhae (Note: Kim Guhae, previously King Guheyong of Geumgwan Gaya, was given the title Sangdŭng (Korean: 상등; Hanja: 上等) upon his surrender to Bopheung in 532. Historians are still unsure whether Sangdŭng was a different rendering of Sangdaedŭng, or simply an honorary title.)	김구해	金仇亥	532?–576?	
Jinji	Geochilbu	거칠부	居柒夫	576–?	
Jinpyeong	Noribu	노리부	弩里夫	579–588?	
Jinpyeong	Sueulbu	수을부	首乙夫	588?–?	
Seondeok	Eulje	을제	乙祭	632–636	
Seondeok	Sup'um	수품	水品	636–645?	
Seondeok	Bidam	비담	毗曇	645?–647	
Jindeok	Alch'ŏn	알천	閼川	647–654	
Muyeol	Kŭm Kang	금강	金剛	655–660	
Muyeol/Munmu	Kim Yu-sin	김유신	金庾信	660–673	
Munmu	Kim Gungwan	김군관	金軍官	680?–681	
Sinmun/Hyoso?	Chin Pok	진복	眞福	681–694?	
Hyoso	Munyŏng	문영	文穎	694–695	
Hyoso	Kaewŏn	개원	愷元	695–?	
Seongdeok	Inp'um	인품	仁品	706–720	
Seongdeok	Pae Pu	배부	裵賦	720–728	
Seongdeok	Kim Sagong	김사공	金思恭	728–?	
Seongdeok	Chŏng Chong	정종	貞宗	737–?	
Gyeondeok	Kim Sain	김사인	金思仁	745–757	
Gyeondeok	Sinch'ung	신충	信忠	757–764	
Gyeondeok	Manjong	만종	萬宗	764–768?	
Hyegong	Sin Yu	신유	神猷	768–?	
Hyegong	Kim Yang-sang	김양상	金良相	774–780	
Seondeok	Kim Kyŏngsin	김경신	金敬信	780?–785	
Wonseong	Ch'ungnyŏm	충렴	忠廉	785–792	
Wonseong/Soseong?	Segang	세강	世強	792–?	
Aejang	Kim Ŏnsŭng	김언승	金彦昇	801–809	
Heondeok	Kim Sungpin	김숭빈	金崇斌	809?–819	
Heondeok	Kim Suchong	김수종	金秀宗	819–?	
Heungdeok	Kim Kyunchŏng	김균정	金均貞	835–836	
Huigang	Kim Myŏng	김명	金明	836?–838	
Minae	Kim Kwi	김귀	金貴	838–?	
Sinmu?	Chang Pogo	장보고	張保皐	839–?	
Munseong	Yejing	예징	禮徵	840–849	
Munseong	Kim Ŭichŏng	김의정	金義正	849–857	
Heonan	Kim An	김안	金安	857–?	
Gyeongmun	Kim Chŏng	김정	金正	862–874	
Gyeongmun	Wijin	위진	魏珍	874–875	
Heongang/Jinseong?	Kim Wihong	김위홍	金魏弘	875–888?	
Hyogong	Chunhŭng	준흥	俊興	898–?	
Hyogong/Gyeongmyeong	Kim Sŏng	김성	金成	906–912, 919–?	
Sindeok	Kyegang	계강	繼康	912–?	
Gyeongmyeong	Wiŭng	위응	魏鷹	917–924	
