= Alch'ŏn =

Silla politician (fl. 6th–7th centuries)

Sangdaedŭng of Silla
- In office 647–654?
- Monarch: Jindeok
- Preceded by: Bidam
- Succeeded by: Kŭm Kang

Personal details
- Born: 577?
- Died: 686?

Korean name
- Hangul: 알천
- Hanja: 閼川
- RR: Alcheon
- MR: Alch'ŏn

Kim Alch'ŏn (aka So Alch'ŏn, 577?–686?) was a Silla politician who served as a general during Queen Seondeok's reign, and as Sangdaedŭng from 647 to 654, during Queen Jindeok's reign. He was the first politician to serve in Silla's highest military and political office, respectively.

== Birth and Ancestry ==
Little is known about Alch'ŏn's early life and ancestry. The genealogy book of the Jinju So clan suggests that Alch'ŏn was born in 577 in Saryang-bu, Gyeongju, and died in 686. According to genealogy records Alch'ŏn was also the 25th great-grandson of So Bŏldori (소벌도리; 蘇伐都利), who was a chief from Saro-guk, and the 14th great-grandson of King Adalla of Silla.

A famous legend about Alch'ŏn's bravery relates that once, Alcheon was out in the forest together with the other hwarangs. Suddenly, a tiger appeared and was about to attack them. The Hwarangs were terrified and started to panic, but Alcheon just smiled and attacked the tiger alone and killed it with his bare hands.

== Career ==
In 636, Alch'ŏn, who was then a general, received orders from Queen Seondeok to drive off the Baekje forces in Yeoguen-gok. Alch'ŏn and his 500 men ambushed and decimated Baekje general Uso's invading force near Doksan Fortress. Alch'ŏn was promoted as the Grand General (대장군; 大將軍) of Silla the following year. In early 638, Alch'ŏn repelled invading Goguryeo forces outside Chiljungseong Fortress, capturing and killing numerous enemy soldiers.

Despite his victories against both Baekje and Goguryeo forces, no records of his career as the Grand General of Silla after the 638 battle of Chiljungseong Fortress appear in historical sources. Thus, historians have speculated that Silla's failures during Uija of Baekje's 642 campaign may have led to his removal from his military position.

In early 647, Bidam, who was then the Sangdaedŭng of Silla, launched a rebellion against Queen Seondeok. Bidam rallied the nobility, arguing that a woman was unfit for the position of a monarch. Nevertheless, Alch'ŏn remained loyal to the throne, and the rebellion was suppressed under the leadership of Kim Yu-sin. Seondeok's death during the rebellion led to the coronation of Queen Jindeok. Possibly seeking a figure who would satisfy the Silla nobles, Jindeok immediately appointed Alch'ŏn, who was a jingol noble from birth, as Bidam's successor.

The Seonggol lineage, which had been in a lack of a male heir since the death of Jinpyeong, came to a complete end with Queen Jindeok's death in 654. With no Seonggol heirs to inherit the throne, the Hwabaek Council offered Alch'ŏn the position of king regent by procedure. However, Alch'ŏn declined the offer on account of his "old age" and "lack of virtue"; he instead endorsed Kim Ch'un-ch'u, who would later assume the throne as King Muyeol of Silla.

No historical accounts of Alch'ŏn after his endorsement of Kim Ch'un-ch'u exist. It is assumed that he resigned from his position as Sangdaedŭng in 655 upon Kŭm Kang's appointment as his successor.

== Popular culture ==
- Portrayed by Lee Seung-hyo in the 2009 MBC TV series Queen Seondeok.
- Portrayed by Im Hyuk in the 2012–2013 KBS1 TV series Dream of the Emperor.
