= Gyeongdeok of Silla =

35th monarch of Silla (r. 742–765)

King Gyeondeok 경덕왕 景德王
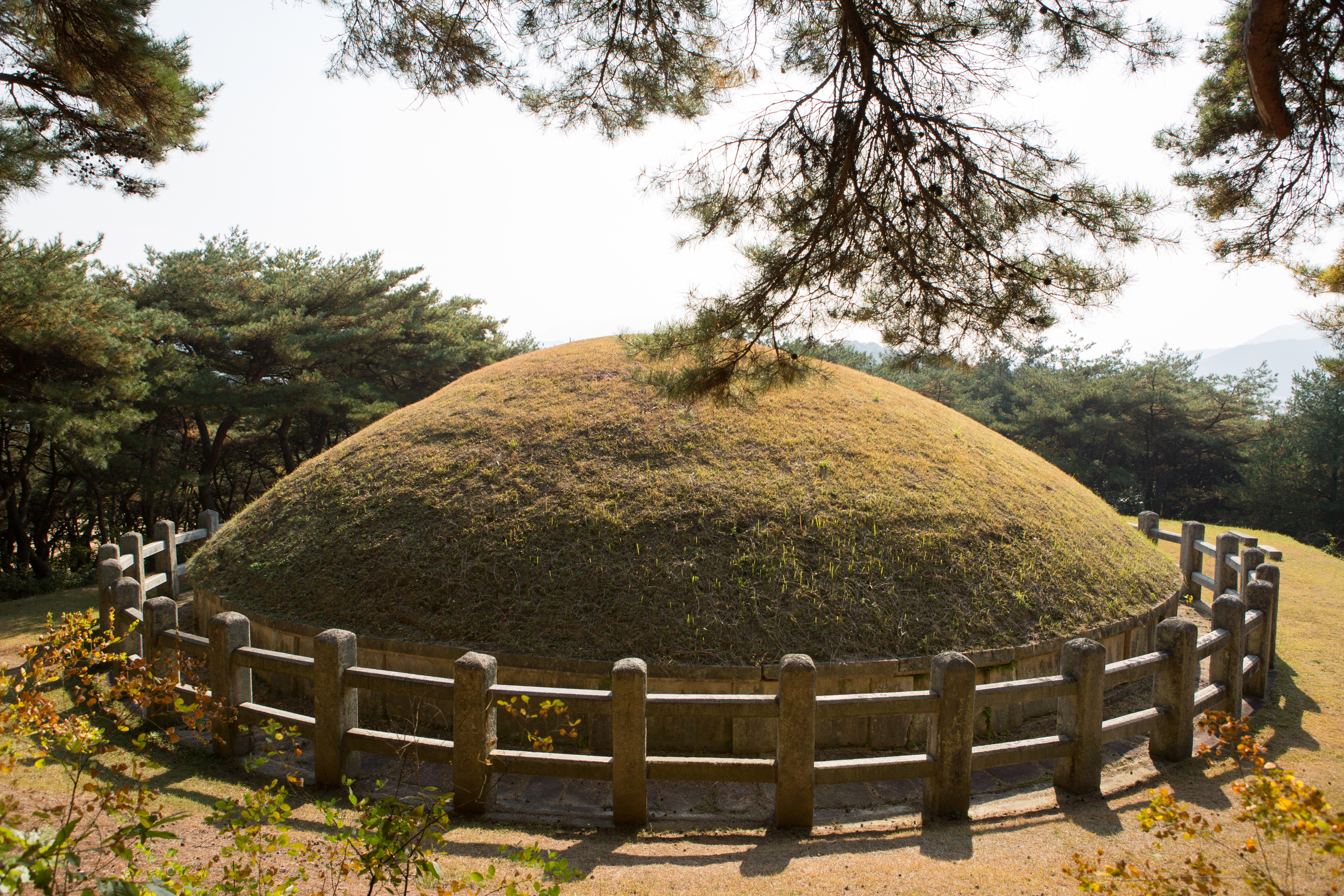
- Tomb believed to belong to King Gyeongdeok (2015)

King of Unified Silla
- Reign: 742–765
- Coronation: 742
- Predecessor: Hyoseong of Silla
- Successor: Hyegong of Silla
- Born: 723~724
- Died: 765
- Father: Seongdeok of Silla
- Mother: Queen Sodeok

Korean name
- Hangul: 김헌영
- Hanja: 金憲英
- RR: Gim Heonyeong
- MR: Kim Hŏnyŏng

Monarch name
- Hangul: 경덕왕
- Hanja: 景德王
- RR: Gyeongdeogwang
- MR: Kyŏngdŏgwang

Gyeongdeok (景德; 723~724–765) was the 35th ruler of Silla and son of King Seongdeok (reigned 702–737). He succeeded his elder brother, King Hyoseong, the 34th ruler of Silla. His reign is considered a golden age in Unified Silla's history, particularly for Buddhist art and architecture. He is noted as an avid patron of Buddhism and an influential political and religious individual. King Gyeongdeok also made attempts to centralize the country through reorganizing government and standardizing naming practices. With his mother as regent, Gyeongdeok's son, King Hyegong, succeeded him after his death.

== Projects under reign ==
King Gyeongdeok is best known for the multiple architectural projects that began under his reign. The most notable of these is the Divine Bell of King Seongdeok, which he commissioned and named for his father. The construction began in 742 and finished during the reign of King Hyoseong. The tomb of King Seongdeok was also completed by King Gyeongdeok in alignment with the styles of the Great Stupa of Sanchi and Bharhut Stupa.

Buddhist architecture also gained much support from King Gyeongdeok. The construction of Seokguram Grotto also began under his reign headed by Prime Minister Kim Dae-seong in 751, who also oversaw the construction of Bulguksa and the Dabotap Pagoda which began construction in the same year. King Gyeongdeok also constructed a Jangsaenpyo at Borimsa to express his gratitude for the support of Master Wanpyo in his administrative endeavors.

It is also likely that King Gyeongdeok constructed one of the lotus ponds in the southwest region of Wolseong Castle, which spans approximately forty meters from east to west and fifty meters from north to south.

== Government reform ==
King Gyeongdeok attempted further centralization of Korea through organization of government and post naming conventions.

King Gyeongdeok tried to establish a government system similar to the Chinese system of governing, where regions were governed by court-appointed officials rather than local nobles.

The standardization of naming conventions happened across multiple levels during King Gyeongdeok's reign. The Gongbang class, or artisans, offices were renamed using the suffix "bang" from "jeon" during his reign. A similar change was that of forge workers' titles, from Cheolyujeon (鐵鍮典) was changed to Chukyabang (築冶房), which have the same essential meaning.

Locations were standardized as well under King Gyeongdeok. Records in the Samguk sagi show a list of toponyms from Silla and Korea's conquered kingdoms of Goguryeo and Baekje that were standardized to Chinese names in 757. The records contain both the new standardized Chinese name and a phonetic Chinese transcription of the original name of each location, which were generally similar to the semantic meaning of the Chinese name. Sanum, a county in modern South Gyeongsang Province. Called Chip'umch'on in the Silla period, the province was renamed Sanum and incorporated into Kwólsóng gun.

== Death ==
A tomb believed to belong to him is located in Gyeongju, South Korea. There is some debate over the true owner of the tomb. It is a Historic Site of South Korea No. 23.

== Family ==
- Grandfather Sinmun of Silla (김정명; 642–692)
- Grandmother: Queen Sinmok of the Kim clan (신목왕후 김씨; 655–700)
- Father: Seongdeok of Silla (reigned 702–737) (성덕왕; 691–737)
- Mother: Queen Sodeok (소덕왕후 김씨) of the Kim clan (700–724)
- Wife:
  - Queen Sammo of the Kim clan (삼모부인 김씨; 723–?); daughter of Kim Sun–jeong (김순정; 690–?)
  - Queen Gyeongsu of the Kim clan (경수왕후 김씨; 725–?); daughter of Kim Ui-chung (김의충; 695–?)
    - Daughter: Lady Kim (김씨; 750–?)
    - Son: Hyegong of Silla (758–780); was the 36th ruler of the Korean kingdom of Silla.
  - Lady Kim (김씨; 727–?); daughter Kim Sun–jeong (김순정; 690–?)

== See also ==
- Silla
- Korean Buddhism
- List of Korean monarchs
- List of Silla people

Gyeongdeok of Silla House of Kim Died: 765
Regnal titles
Preceded by Hyoseong	King of Silla; Silla; 742–765	Succeeded by Hyegong
