= Seondeok of Silla =

Seondeok of Silla may refer to:

== People ==
- Queen Seondeok of Silla, reigned 632–647
- King Seondeok of Silla, reigned 780–785

== Media ==
- Queen Seondeok (TV series), 2009 South Korean historical drama TV series.
