= Hwabaek =

Silla governing body

The Hwabaek (Korean: 화백; Hanja: 和白), or Council of Nobles, served as the chief royal council in Silla; it was composed of the nobles of Jingol rank and headed by the Sangdaedeung. The Hwabaek council decided the most important state affairs, such as succession to the throne and declarations of war.

== History ==
The Hwabaek possibly had its origins in the clan meetings of villages, from the prehistoric era. When the Saro (Silla) confederacy was formed, the founding six clans and then later the chiefs of clans of annexed smaller states gathered and formed a decision making body. Researchers consider the council of the six clan chiefs, enthroning Bak Hyeokgeose to be the first ruler of the loose confederacy of clans, as the prototype of the Hwabaek.

The Hwabaek Council was held only when the state had important events, attendees at the council were only nobles of the "true bone" rank. It was also a unanimous, not a majority, system in which a single opponent would not pass the plan. The venue for the Hwabaek Council was decided by taking turns to four sacred places in Silla.

It is presumed that the king participated in the early days of Silla. This is confirmed at the monument of Jijeung of Silla and the Monument of Beopheung of Silla.

From 531, the head of the aristocracy, the Sangdaedeung presided over the council, and a new Sangdaedeung was elected every time a new king ascended the throne. In 664, when Queen Jindeok died and there was no rightful heir to the throne, Alcheon, the leader of the Hwabaek was nominated to be regent. The council made a decision to depose King Jinji, as they were not satisfied with his rule. In 647, Sangdaedeung Pidam decided to dethrone Queen Seondeok with the help of a handful of the highest aristocrats.

From the era of Munmu of Silla and Sinmun of Silla the royal authority became stronger and the status of Sangdaedeung and Hwabaek Council weakened. It eventually ceded real political power to the Jipsabu (Chancellery Office), the highest administrative body directly under the king, and was reduced to the role of pointing out errors in the Jipsabu administration.

However, the council briefly regained prominence during the late Silla period, from 780, when royal authority weakened again. In the 9th century many of the Sangdaedeung were close relatives of the king.

== See also ==
- Book of Sui, Silla Records (Chinese: 隋書 新羅傳)
- Old Book of Tang, Silla Records (Chinese: 舊唐書 新羅傳)
