= Pidam =

Silla politician (d. 647)

Sangdaedeung of Silla
- In office 645–647
- Monarch: Seondeok
- Preceded by: Sup'um
- Succeeded by: Alch'ŏn

Personal details
- Born: Unknown
- Died: February 26, 647
- Cause of death: Execution

Korean name
- Hangul: 비담
- Hanja: 毗曇
- RR: Bidam
- MR: Pidam

Pidam (Korean: 비담; Hanja: 毗曇; ? – 26 February 647) was a Silla politician who served as Sangdaedeung from 645 to 647. He is most known for leading a rebellion against Queen Seondeok of Silla, one of the Three Kingdoms of Korea. Prior to his rebellion, he held the position of a Sangdaedeung (the highest official in the court). Details about his birth or achievements are vaguely known as there are no actual records containing them. However, being a Sangdaedeung, could have meant that he was part of the royal nobles or a Jinggol.

== Revolt against Queen Seondeok of Silla ==
On the year 645, Pidam was appointed for the highest position in the court (Sangdaedeung) by Queen Seondok. At that time, the Queen's health was deteriorating and could no longer fulfill her duties as she once did, thus leaving most of the work to Pidam. During that time, Silla was suffering from incursions from the joined forces of the Baekje and Goguryeo which took over 40 fortresses from the west part of Silla. On the other side, the noble members of the Hwabaek Council were also worried about the growing influence of the monarch. The nation was at the point of crisis and not far from ruined. Two years after his appointment, Pidam led a rebellion to dethrone the Queen, asserting that: "The female king failed to rule the country, therefore women should stop ruling". Pidam was a person who had a strong political influence over the court and held the highest position next to the king, and his reputation among the people was also high. Because of this, a lot of them supported his cause and made it the biggest rebellion in Silla's history. He gathered his supporters at the fortress Myeonghwalseong, to prepare for the battle against Kim Yushin and his army in Wolseong Fortress where the Queen resides. The rebellion started around 8 February 647 and ended on 17 February 647. Queen Seondeok died before the rebellion was completely suppressed. Her cousin was then proclaimed as the next female ruler of Silla and became Queen Jindeok, later on. Queen Jindeok ordered the execution of Pidam and 30 of his men along with their entire family on 26 February 647 (9 days after Queen Seondeok's death). Although some story says that Pidam died in the middle of his rebellion, prompting for it to end just less than 10 days after it started; and that Queen Seondeok, died just two days after the Rebellion started.

There was an anecdote about Pidam's rebellion, it says that: On the night of Pidam's rebellion, Pidam saw what appeared to be a star falling on the Wolseong fortress where the Queen resides. Pidam used it as a sign of the Queen's downfall to encourage his superstitious followers. When the Queen heard of it, she was shaken by fear but Kim Yushin calmed her by telling her not to worry for he has a plan to quell his rebellion. He then attached a burning scarecrow to a huge kite and flew it in the sky to make it appear that the star was back in its place. When Pidam's followers saw it, they were greatly discouraged and their morale dropped. The rebellion was then suppressed by Kim Yushin and Kim Alcheon.

== Reason for his rebellion ==
Pidam's reason for rebellion has remained debatable.

The constant invasion from the joined forces of the Baekje and Goguryeo almost brought the whole kingdom into ruin. They lost lands and fortresses. The Queen has lowered the tax for the poor but built many temples and statues at a high cost for the royal treasury. They received mockery from the Tang Emperor and to make the matters worse, Queen Seondeok decided to build Hwangnyongsa (was said to be the tallest temple at that time) - a decision that wasn't well received by her people, knowing that they will shoulder the expenses for the said temple, in a time that fund was needed the most. Pidam and Yeomjong used this as one of the reasons for their rebellion.

His rebellion may be due to the idea of having another female ruler (Queen Jindeok) after Queen Seondeok, due to the amount of humiliations and loss that they suffered during her reign. According to the Tang emperor, the reason why they suffered from constant invasion was due to the fact that their neighboring countries didn't fear them for having a woman as their ruler.

According to Silla's custom, in the event that a king passed away without a legitimate successor, the Sangdaedeung may be allowed to the throne as the new ruler, any other candidate will have to be approved first by the Hwabaek Council. Pidam, who was the Sangdaedeung at that time and has good reputation and influence over the court, was the strongest candidate for the throne. However, Jindeok was named as the successor even with the Hwabaek's approval.

But Pidam, who have been favored by the Queen, shouldn't have a reason for his sudden animosity or the desire to take the throne, without anyone noticing – especially the Queen. And so, some historians believed that Pidam, may have just been a victim of political manipulations by Kim Yushin, who have been trying to establish an absolute monarchy for Kim Chunchu. There was an alliance that was formed between Kim Yushin's supporters and King Kim Chunchu's supporters, after Kim Chunchu married Kim Yushin's sister. This alliance is what gave Kim Yushin a strong influence and power in the court, rivaling Pidam's power at that time. The problem starts after Pidam got appointed as the Sangdaedeung – a position that made Pidam the most powerful man in Silla.

One of the theories about it was that: During the time that Queen Seondeok's health was getting worse, the talk about her successor became an issue especially because Queen Seondeok refused to name her successor (out of fear of being manipulated). Pidam, who was a Sangdaedeung at that time and was people's favorite, has the strongest chance to become the next ruler. One night, Kim Yushin started a secret coup inside the palace and surrounded the whole place with his soldiers and didn't let anyone on the opponent's side to enter. When the Queen asked what the commotion was all about, Yushin told her that Pidam betrayed her and planning to start a coup to dethrone her, the Queen didn't believe him at first, but days has passed and Pidam and the rest of the nobles still hasn't shown up. Pidam and the royal nobles who heard of this news was enraged with what they believed was a plan to usurp the throne and gathered their soldiers and supporters to march towards the palace. A messenger then came and reported to the Queen, that the royal nobles, led by Pidam were marching towards the palace with their entire army. The Queen was shocked and disheartened by this news, but Kim Yushin calmed her and told her that "Pidam was a traitor who betrayed his Queen. But fear not! For I, have a plan to quell him". However, not too long after that, the Queen died. Although some story says that Queen Seondeok, may have been killed by one of the soldiers from the coup. Thus, despite Pidam's rebellion being said as one of the biggest in Silla's history – it didn't even last for 10 days, because it wasn't planned.

Some reasoned out that if Pidam, was truly against the idea of having a female ruler then he should have rebelled against that idea early on- back when she was still competing for the throne and not during the time that she was sick enough to die. Pidam, should have been wise enough to know the consequences of a failed rebellion; not to put his name, his entire clan, his position and everything he worked hard for at risk, by leading the rebellion himself.

== Aftermath ==
Pidam's rebellion caused a lot of changes in Silla. Because of this failed rebellion, the influence of the nobles inside the court was decreased and since the rebellious nobles were purged, the power of the monarch was firmly established over Silla. King Taejong Muyeol (Kim Chunchu) passed over 60 laws aiming to establish a centralized government in Silla based on the legal system.

He is considered the 'Greatest Rebel in Silla History'. It is also believed that Pidam considered his main rival for the power in Silla to be Kim Yushin.

== Theories about his early life ==
It is said that Pidam and Alcheon were close in age and served during King Jinpyeong's reign. And since Alcheon was a hwarang, there is a chance that Pidam may have been a hwarang back in his younger days and got promoted for his achievements later on. Another belief was that he was once a scholar whom people loved. He and Alcheon, together with Kim Yongchun, were said to be the people behind the power that supported Queen Seondeok during her time as a princess. His political clan may have played a big part in the fall of Gaya during Gaya-Silla War, prompting the rivalry between him and Kim Yushin.

== Modern depictions ==
- Portrayed by Lee Young Jae in the 2006 SBS TV series Yeon Gaesomun.
- Portrayed by Kim Nam-gil and Park Ji-bin in the 2009 MBC TV series Queen Seondeok.
- Portrayed by Choi Cheol-ho in the 2012–2013 KBS1 TV series Dream of the Emperor.

== See also ==
- Queen Seondeok of Silla
- Three Kingdoms of Korea
- Kim Yushin
- History of Korea
- Rulers of Korea
- Queen Seondeok (TV series)
