= Hyoseong of Silla =

34th monach of Silla (r. 737–742)

King Hyoseong 효성왕 孝成王

King of Unified Silla
- Reign: 737–742
- Coronation: 737
- Predecessor: Seongdeok of Silla
- Successor: Gyeongdeok of Silla
- Born: Unknown
- Died: 742; Silla
- Father: Seongdeok of Silla
- Mother: Queen Sodeok

Korean name
- Hangul: 김승겸
- Hanja: 金承慶
- RR: Gim Seunggyeom
- MR: Kim Sŭnggyŏm

Monarch name
- Hangul: 효성왕
- Hanja: 孝成王
- RR: Hyoseongwang
- MR: Hyosŏngwang

Hyoseong (r. 737–742, died 742) (Note: This is given in some sources as 741, presumably due to discrepancies between the lunar and solar calendars.) was the 34th king to rule the Koreanic kingdom Silla. He was the second son of King Seondeok and Queen Sodeok.

Hyoseong took the daughter of the pajinchan Yeongjong as a concubine. This led to palace strife, as the jealous queen killed the concubine and Yeongjong plotted to kill her. Hyoseong had Yeongjong put to death.

After he died in 742, Hyoseong was cremated to the south of Beomnyusa temple, and his ashes were buried in the Sea of Japan (East Sea). Korean historians believe they had found what was believed to have been his planned tomb, but as Hyoseong died and was cremated this tomb was never finished.

== Family ==
- Grandfather Sinmun of Silla (r. 681–692) (김정명)
- Grandmother: Queen Sinmok of the Kim clan (신목왕후 김씨;d. 700)
- Father: Seongdeok of Silla (reigned 702–737) (성덕왕)
- Mother: Queen Sodeok (소덕왕후 김씨), of the Kim clan
- Wife:
  - Queen Park, of the Park clan (왕후 박씨)
  - Queen Hyemyeong, of the Kim clan (혜명왕후 김씨)
  - Concubine Park, of the Park clan (후궁 박씨)

== See also ==
- Unified Silla
- List of Korean monarchs
- List of Silla people

== Notes ==
Hyoseong of Silla House of Kim Died: 742
Regnal titles
Preceded by Seongdeok	King of Silla; Silla; 737–742	Succeeded by Gyeongdeok
