= Hyegong of Silla =

36th monarch of Silla (r. 765–780)

King Hyegong 혜공왕 惠恭王

King of Silla
- Reign: 765–780
- Coronation: 765
- Predecessor: Gyeongdeok of Silla
- Successor: King Seondeok of Silla
- Born: 758
- Died: 780 (aged 21–22); Silla
- Father: Gyeongdeok of Silla
- Mother: Queen Gyeongsu

Korean name
- Hangul: 김건운
- Hanja: 金乾運
- RR: Gim Geonun
- MR: Kim Kŏnun

Monarch name
- Hangul: 혜공왕
- Hanja: 惠恭王
- RR: Hyegongwang
- MR: Hyegongwang

Hyegong (758–780), personal name Kim Kŏn-un, was the 36th ruler of the Korean kingdom of Silla. Being the only child between King Gyeongdeok and Lady Manwol (Queen Gyeongsu), Hyegong was the last descendant of King Muyeol to sit on the throne. Because of this, Hyegong's reign is often regarded as the end of the middle period of the Silla state.

Hyegong became king at the age of 8, and did not adapt well to the role. According to the Samguk sagi, Hyegong's dissolute life as a young monarch kept the palace in disarray. They faced rebellions led by high officials (Kim Daegong and others) in 768, 770 and 775. Faced in 780 with another rebellion led by his ichan Kim Chi-jŏng, the monarch dispatched sangdaedeung Kim Yang-sang to put down the uprising, but the rebel forces managed to storm the palace and assassinated Hyegong and other royal family members. Kim Yang-sang, who was an eleventh-generation descendant of King Naemul, then took the throne as King Seondeok.

Records show that Hyegong's behaviour was effeminate and showed either homosexual or bisexual tendency. Records have traditionally described the monarch as "a man by appearance but a woman by nature". In Dongsa Gangmok, Ahn Jeong-bok described Hyegong's reign as "peculiar, for it was said that the king became a man as a woman, and for the king played with girl's toys as a child." Today's historians often speculate that Hyegong was a trans woman.

== Family ==
- Grandfather: Seongdeok of Silla (reigned 702–737)
- Grandmother: Queen Sodeok (소덕왕후 김씨), of the Kim clan
- Father: Gyeongdeok of Silla
- Mother: Queen Gyeongsu, of the Kim clan
- Wife:
  - Queen Wi, of the Wi clan (신파부인 위씨)
  - Queen Changchang, of the Kim clan ( 창창부인 김씨), daughter of Kim Chang (김장)

== See also ==
- Unified Silla
- List of Korean monarchs
- List of Silla people

Hyegong of Silla House of Kim Born: 758 Died: 780
Regnal titles
Preceded by Gyeongdeok	King of Silla; Silla; 765–780	Succeeded by King Seondeok
