= King Seondeok of Silla =

37th monarch of Silla (r. 780–785)

King Seondeok 선덕왕 宣德王

King of Silla
- Reign: 780–785
- Coronation: 780
- Predecessor: Hyegong of Silla
- Successor: Wonseong of Silla
- Born: Unknown
- Died: 785; Silla
- Father: Kim Hyo-bang
- Mother: Queen Saso

- King Seondeok of Silla
- Hangul: 김양상
- Hanja: 金良相
- RR: Gim Yangsang
- MR: Kim Yangsang

Monarch name
- Hangul: 선덕왕
- Hanja: 宣德王
- RR: Seondeogwang
- MR: Sŏndŏgwang

Seondeok (?–785), personal name Kim Yang-sang, was the 37th ruler of Silla and the 8th ruler of Unified Silla. Prior to that, he served as a Sangdaedeung to King Hyegong of Silla.

== Family ==
- Grandfather: Seongdeok Daewang (reigned 702–737)
- Grandmother: Queen Seongjeong (성정왕후 김씨), of the Kim clan, the daughter of Kim Wŏn-t'ae (김원태)
- Father: Kim Hyo-bang (김효방)
- Mother: Queen Saso (사소부인), daughter of Seongdeok of Silla
- Wife:
  - Queen Gujok, of the Kim clan (구족왕후 김씨)

== Biography ==
His birth name was Kim Yang-sang. He was an eleventh-generation descendant of King Naemul, and the Daughter of haechan Kim Hyo-bang by King Seongdeok's daughter Lady Saso. He married Lady Gujok, the daughter of gakgan Kim Yang-pum. Seondeok served under King Hyegong in the position of sangdaedeung.

In 780, ichan Kim ji-Jeong, led a rebellion against King Hyegong. The King ordered the then Sangdaedeung Kim Yang-Sang(later, King Seondeok) to fight off the rebels. However, the rebel forces succeeded in storming the palace and killed King Hyegong and his Queen. Kim Yang-san was then proclaimed as Silla's new ruler. Some historians believed that King Seondeok may have killed King Hyegong himself, since he was the one who benefited the most from his death.

After his death in 785, Seondeok was cremated and his ashes scattered on the Sea of Japan (East Sea). Seondeok's successor was King Wonseong.

== See also ==
- Unified Silla
- List of Korean monarchs
- List of Silla people
- Queen Seondeok of Silla

King Seondeok of Silla House of Kim Died: 785
Regnal titles
Preceded by Hyegong	King of Silla; Silla; 780–785	Succeeded by Wonseong
