= Queen Sinmok =

Queen of Silla (655–700)

Queen Sinmok of the Gyeongju Kim clan (신목왕후 김씨; 655 – 1 June 700), was the queen regent of Silla between 692 and 700.

She was the second wife of king Sinmun of Silla and the mother of king Hyoso of Silla. She ruled as regent during the minority of her son between 692 and 700.

She was called Mother King (母王) by Japan. The expression literally shows that she was the "King as a mother", which implies that she was the actual ruler of Silla after the death of her husband.

== Family ==
- Father - Kim Heum-woon (김흠운; 金歆運; 623 – 655); first husband of Princess Yoseok
  - Grandfather - Kim Dal-bok (김달복, 達福公; 604–?)
  - Grandmother - Kim Jeong-hui (김정희, 金政熙; 610–?) of the Gimhae Kim clan
- Mother - Princess Yoseok of the Gyeongju Kim clan (요석공주; 630–?)
  - Grandfather - King Muyeol of Silla (무열왕; 603 – 661)
  - Grandmother - Kim Bo-hui (김보희; 金寶姬), Lady Yeongchang (영창부인) of the Gimhae Kim clan (603–?) (Note: Also known as Kim Hyang-ah (김항아, 金姮娥). She was the older sister of Kim Jeong-hui, thus making Kim Heum-woon and Princess Yoseok first cousins.)
- Stepfather - Wonhyo (원효; 617 – 686)
- Siblings
  - Older half-brother - Seol Chung (설총; 647 – 736)
- Husband - Kim Jeong-myeong, King Sinmun of Silla (신문왕; 642 – 692)
- Issue
  - Son - Kim Yi-hong, King Hyoso of Silla (효소왕; 687 – 702); was the 32nd monarch of Silla
  - Son - Kim Yong-gi, King Seongdeok of Silla (성덕왕; 691 – 737); was the 33rd King of Silla
    - Daughter-in-law - Queen Seongjeong of the Gyeongju Kim clan (성정왕후 김씨; 691–?)
    - Daughter-in-law - Queen Sodeok of the Gyeongju Kim clan (소덕왕후 김씨; 700–724)
      - Grandson - Kim Seung-gyeong, King Hyoseong of Silla (효성왕; 718 – 742)
      - Grandson - Kim Heon-yeong, King Gyeongdeok of Silla (경덕왕; 723 – 765)
      - Granddaughter - Lady Kim (724–?)
  - Son - Kim Geun-jil (김근질; 金根質; 693–?)
  - Son - Kim Sa–jong (김사종; 金詞宗; 695–?)
