= Tomb of King Seongdeok =

Tomb in Gyeongju, South Korea

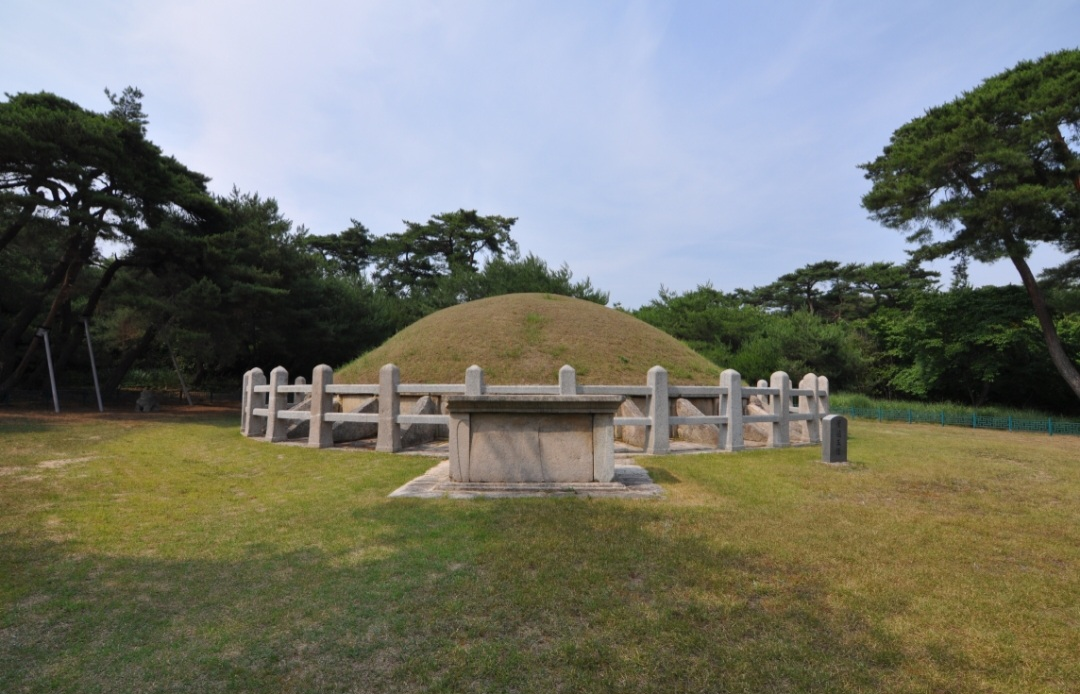
- The tomb
- Interactive map of Tomb of King Seongdeok
- Location: Gyeongju, South Korea
- Coordinates: 35°47′16″N 129°16′54″E
- Built for: Seongdeok of Silla (presumed)

Historic Sites of South Korea
- Designated: 1963-01-21
- Reference no.: 28

The Tomb of King Seongdeok (Korean: 성덕왕릉; Hanja: 聖德王陵) is believed to be the tomb of the Silla monarch Seongdeok (r. 702–737). It is located in what is now Gyeongju, South Korea. On January 21, 1963, it was designated Historic Site of South Korea No. 28.

The tomb is circular. It is 46 m (151 ft) in circumference and 5 m (16 ft) in height. It is surrounded by twelve badly damaged stones with carvings of animals of the zodiac. There are a number of statues near the tomb; many of these have been lost or are in poor condition. To its northwest is another tomb believed to belong to the Silla monarch Hyoso, the older brother of Seongdeok.
