= Queen Gyeongsu =

Queen Gyeongsu (경수왕후 김씨; 725–?), also known as Lady Manwol (만월부인), was the queen regent of Silla between 765 and 780.

She was the second consort of king Gyeongdeok of Silla and the mother of king Hyegong of Silla, and ruled during his minority. In 768, she received title of queen mother sent from the Tang Emperor as a diplomatic gift to her son. The queen mother regent was however not able to control the unstable political situation. In 780, her son and his queen consort were killed during a rebellion. It is not documented what happened to the king's mother and regent.

== Family ==
- Father - Kim Ui-chang (김의충; 金義忠; 695–?)
- Unnamed Mother (700–?)
- Spouse
  - Kim Heon-yeong, King Gyeongdeok of Silla (김헌영 경덕왕; 723–765)
    - Father-in-law - Kim Heung-gwang, King Seongdeok of Silla (김흥광 성덕왕; 691–737)
    - Mother-in-law - Queen Sodeok of the Kim clan (소덕왕후 김씨; 700–724)
- Issue
  - Daughter - Lady Kim of the Gyeongju Kim clan (김씨; 750–?)
  - Son - Kim Geon-woon, King Hyegong of Silla (김건운 혜공왕; 758–780)
