= Tomb of King Gyeongdeok =

Silla-era tomb in Gyeongju, South Korea

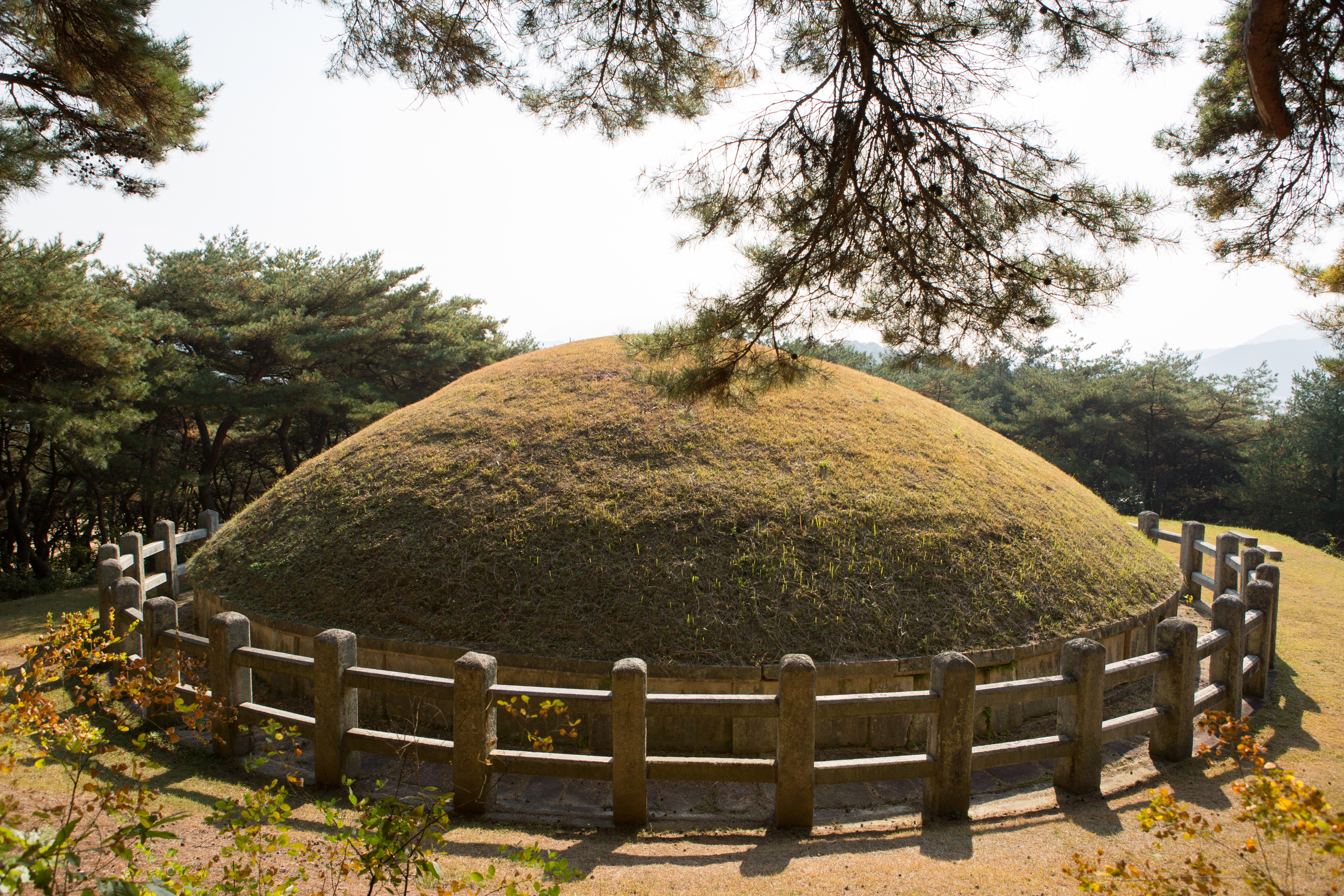
- The tomb (2015)
- Interactive map of Tomb of King Gyeongdeok
- Location: Gyeongju, South Korea
- Coordinates: 35°45′47″N 129°11′14″E
- Built for: Gyeongdeok of Silla (believed to be)

Historic Sites of South Korea
- Designated: 1963-01-21
- Reference no.: 23

The Tomb of King Gyeongdeok (Korean: 경덕왕릉; Hanja: 景德王陵) is believed to belong to Gyeongdeok of Silla (r. 742–765). It is located in Gyeongju, South Korea. On January 21, 1963, it was designated Historic Site of South Korea No. 23. It is a tumulus tomb encircled by a stone fence and carvings of the twelve animals of the zodiac.

Gyeongdeok's burial is mentioned in the historical texts Samguk sagi and Samguk yusa. There is some scholarly debate about whom exactly the tomb belongs to. Some argue that the carvings around the tomb are more characteristic of tombs from later than Gyeongdeok's era.
