= Hyoso of Silla =

32nd monarch of Silla (r. 692–702)

King Hyoso 효소왕 孝昭王

King of Unified Silla
- Reign: 692–702
- Coronation: 692
- Predecessor: Sinmun of Silla
- Successor: King Seongdeok of Silla
- Born: 687
- Died: 702; Silla
- Father: Sinmun of Silla
- Mother: Queen Sinmok

Korean name
- Hangul: 김이홍; 김이공
- Hanja: 金理洪; 金理恭
- RR: Gim Ihong; Gim Igong
- MR: Kim Ihong; Kim Igong

Monarch name
- Hangul: 효소왕
- Hanja: 孝昭王
- RR: Hyosowang
- MR: Hyosowang

Hyoso (Korean: 효소왕; 687–702) (r. 692–702) was the thirty-second monarch of Silla, a kingdom that flourished on the Korean peninsula from approximately 200 to 927 CE. He was the eldest son of King Sinmun and his second consort Queen Sinmok. He reigned for a decade and died of illness in the Silla capital in the autumn of 702.

Hyoso's reign was characterized by a continuing trend towards centralization following Silla's unification of the peninsula. Like his father, Hyoso faced some opposition in the form of revolts by high-ranking members of the Silla aristocracy. In the summer of 700, for instance, the ichan (a high rank in Silla's strict bone rank system) Gyeong-yeong 慶永 was implicated in treasonous plots and executed. These machinations also apparently involved Silla's Chief Minister of State, who was removed from office.

Relations with Tang also saw improvement during Hyoso's reign following the diplomatic disintegration that followed in the wake of the wars of unification during the 660s and 670s and the foundering of the Tang-Silla alliance. Tribute relations were steadily maintained and Hyoso, as Sinmun before him, was "enfeoffed" by the Tang emperor as King of Silla.

A few citations in the record of King Hyoso in the 12th century Korean history Samguk sagi also attest to steady diplomatic contact with Japan, and Japanese histories (notably the Shoku Nihongi) are reliable sources for confirming death dates of Silla's kings and queens during this period, as Japan would often hear of their deaths through diplomatic envoys.

King Hyoso died in 702. Because he had no son he was succeeded by his younger full brother who reigned as King Seongdeok.

== Family ==
- Grandfather: Munmu of Silla (626–681; reigned 661–681
- Grandmother: Queen Jaeui, of the Kim Clan (자의왕후 김씨;d.681)
- Father Sinmun of Silla (r. 681–692) (김정명)
- Mother: Queen Sinmok of the Kim clan (신목왕후 김씨;d. 700)

== See also ==
- History of Korea
- Three Kingdoms of Korea
- Unified Silla

Hyoso of Silla House of Kim Born: 687 Died: 702
Regnal titles
Preceded by Sinmun	King of Silla; 692–702	Succeeded by Seongdeok
