= Sinmun of Silla =

31st monarch of Silla (r. 681–691)

King Sinmun 신문왕 神文王
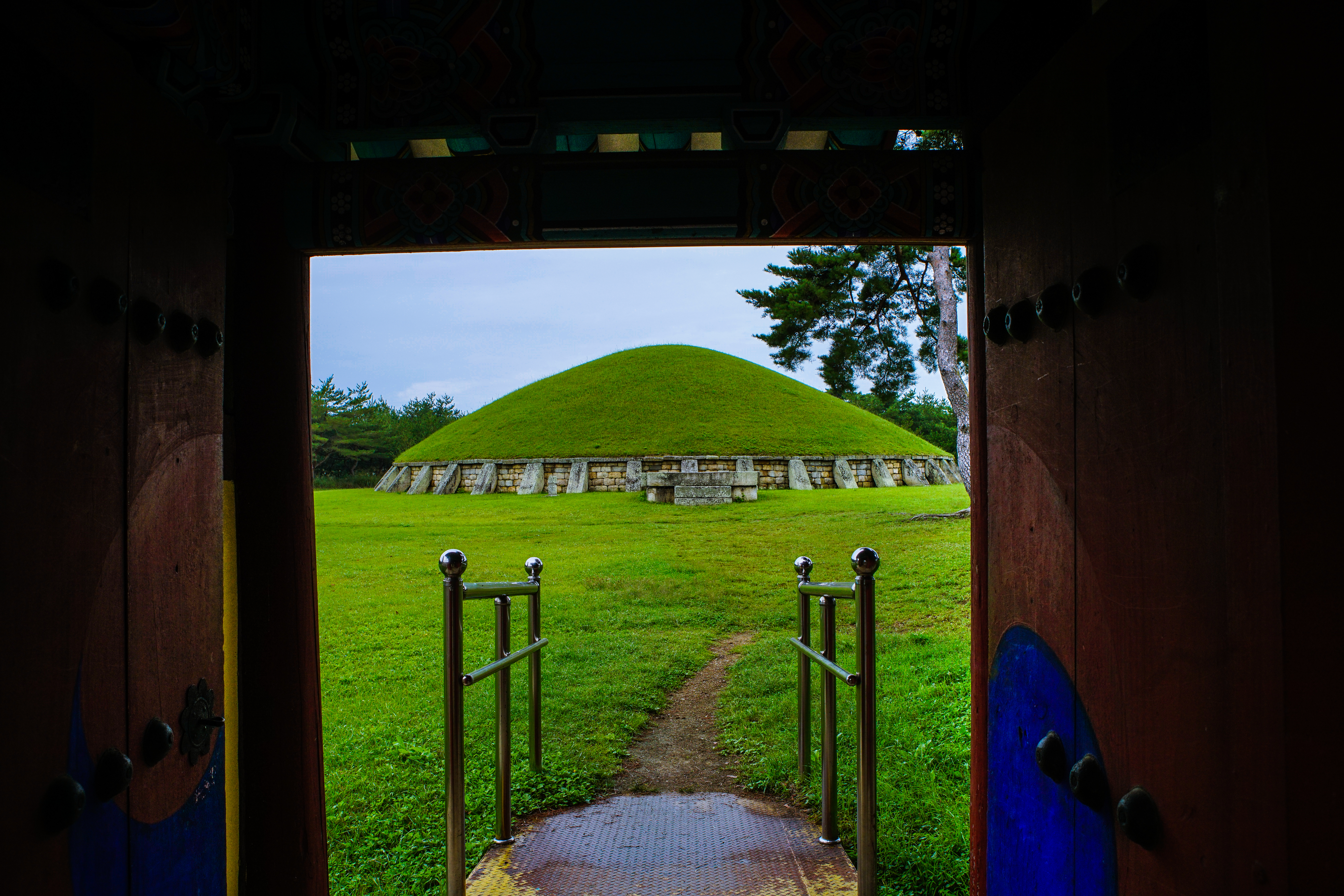
- King Sinmun's tomb

King of Unified Silla
- Reign: 681–691
- Coronation: 681
- Predecessor: Munmu of Silla
- Successor: Hyoso of Silla
- Born: Kim Chŏngmyŏng; Unknown
- Died: 692
- Father: Munmu of Silla
- Mother: Queen Jaeui

Korean name
- Hangul: 김정명
- Hanja: 金政明
- RR: Gim Jeongmyeong
- MR: Kim Chŏngmyŏng

Monarch name
- Hangul: 신문왕
- Hanja: 神文王
- RR: Sinmunwang
- MR: Sinmunwang

Courtesy name
- Hangul: 일소
- Hanja: 日怊
- RR: Ilso
- MR: Ilso

Sinmun (r. 681–692), personal name Kim Chŏngmyŏng, was the thirty-first king of Silla, a Korean state that originated in the southwestern Korean peninsula and went on to unify most of the peninsula under its rule in the mid 7th century. He was the eldest son of Silla's unifier-king, Munmu and Queen Jaeui. Sinmun's reign may be characterized by his attempts to consolidate royal authority following unification and to reorganize and systematize the governing apparatus of the newly enlarged Silla state.

== Biography ==
Sinmun was named crown prince by Munmu in 665. He came to power in the immediate wake of Silla's unification of the peninsula following its defeats of rival Baekje and Goguryeo with military aid from Tang China, and then its check of Tang ambitions to establish its hegemony over the peninsula. It was in late summer 681, not long after coming to power (during the official period of mourning for the recently deceased King Munmu), that a serious revolt broke out against royal authority. The so-called "Kim Hŭm-dol 金欽突 Revolt", named after its leader, a high-ranking Silla official, though a serious challenge to royal authority on the part of a clique of aristocratic officials, also provided Sinmun with the motive to solidify his power through a purge of certain aristocrats. The causes of Kim's revolt are disputed. Kim Hŭm-dol was the father-in-law of Sinmun, who had married his daughter. The failure of Sinmun to produce a male heir through her, and the subsequent erosion of Kim's favor and influence at court may have been a key factor. Other scholars see in it a more serious challenge on the part of military leaders (some of whom were also implicated), who following the successful conclusion of the wars of unification saw their own influence and status erode. Still others see the source of aristocratic grievance being the rising influence of non aristocratic officials, who were increasingly being used to staff government posts. In any case, the 681 revolt was soon put down and Kim Hŭm-dol and those implicated were executed.

Further evidence of Sinmun's ambitious attempts to buttress central authority lies in a 689 royal edict that eliminated the official salary system, called the nogeup 錄邑, or "stipend village", wherein in lieu of salary officials were allotted pieces of land and their attendant population whereby to extricate their income. In place of the nogeup Sinmun instituted a system wherein officials were allotted only "office land" (jikjeon 職田) from which they were allowed to procure only taxes on grain. This was clearly meant to sever the landed power base of aristocratic officialdom. In time, however, this royal initiative would prove no match against an aristocracy united in its determination to protect the sources of its power. Eventually (though not in Sinmun's reign) the old stipend village system would be revived.

It was also in 689 that Sinmun made an ultimately abortive attempt to move the Silla capital from Gyeongju to Dalgubeol 達句伐, at what is now Daegu, evidence again that Sinmun was keen on extricating the base of royal power away from the aristocratic clans, and in so doing to empower it. The Samguk sagi, the source of this attempt at capital shifting, provides no details as to why it failed, though it is safe to assume it encountered stiff resistance by capital aristocrats.

It was following the attempted revolt of Kim Hŭm-dol that Sinmun rescinded the fiefdom granted earlier to Anseung, the would-be king of Goguryeo, and had him come live in the Silla capital of Gyeongju in 683. Perhaps related to this, the following year Sinmun was again faced with rebellion when the general and relation to Anseung was implicated in a revolt and executed. His followers then launched the rebellion without him, seizing what is now Iksan, location of Anseung's erstwhile fief. This revolt too was put down.

Sinmun's reign also saw the expansion of the Silla government and reorganization of Silla territory. Several new departments were established and for the first time were organized a system of nine national provinces (an organization that had clear allusions to the nine provinces of China during the reign of King Yu, legendary founder of the Xia dynasty). Established as well were a series of "secondary capitals" 小京, to which it was Sinmun's policy to relocate many of the peoples subjugated by the defeats of Baekje and Goguryeo. In 682 Sinmun also established the Gukhak, or National Academy, dedicated to training officials in the Confucian classics. He soon thereafter dispatched an embassy to Tang, now under the rule of Empress Wu, to request copies of the Book of Rites and other classics.

Sinmun died in 692, having weathered several serious challenges to royal authority and set the framework for the organization and governance of the expanded Silla state. The aristocratic challenges to his authority, though defeated, were harbingers of the social unrest and political upheavals that would characterize later Silla.

== Family ==
- Grandfather: Muyeol of Silla
- Grandmother: Queen Munmyeong
- Father: Munmu of Silla (626–681; reigned 661–681)
- Mother: Queen Jaeui, of the Kim Clan (자의왕후 김씨;d.681)
- Brother: Prince Somyeong (소명태자; 昭明)
- Wife:
  - Deposed Queen Kim of the Kim clan (폐비 김씨), daughter of Kim Hŭm-dol (김흠돌)
  - Queen Sinmok of the Kim clan (신목왕후 김씨;d. 700)
    - Son: Hyoso of Silla (r. 692–702) - the 32nd monarch of Silla
    - Son: Seongdeok of Silla (성덕왕) was the 33rd King of Silla.
    - Son: Kim Kŭn-jil (김근질)
    - Son: Kim Sa–jong (김사종)

== Popular culture ==
- Portrayed by Jo Yong-jin in the 2012–2013 KBS1 TV series Dream of the Emperor.

== See also ==
- History of Korea
- Three Kingdoms of Korea
- Unified Silla

Sinmun of Silla House of Kim Died: 691
Regnal titles
Preceded by Munmu	King of Silla; 681–691	Succeeded by Hyoso
