= Seongdeok of Silla =

33rd monarch of Silla (r. 702–737)

King Seongdeok 성덕왕 聖德王
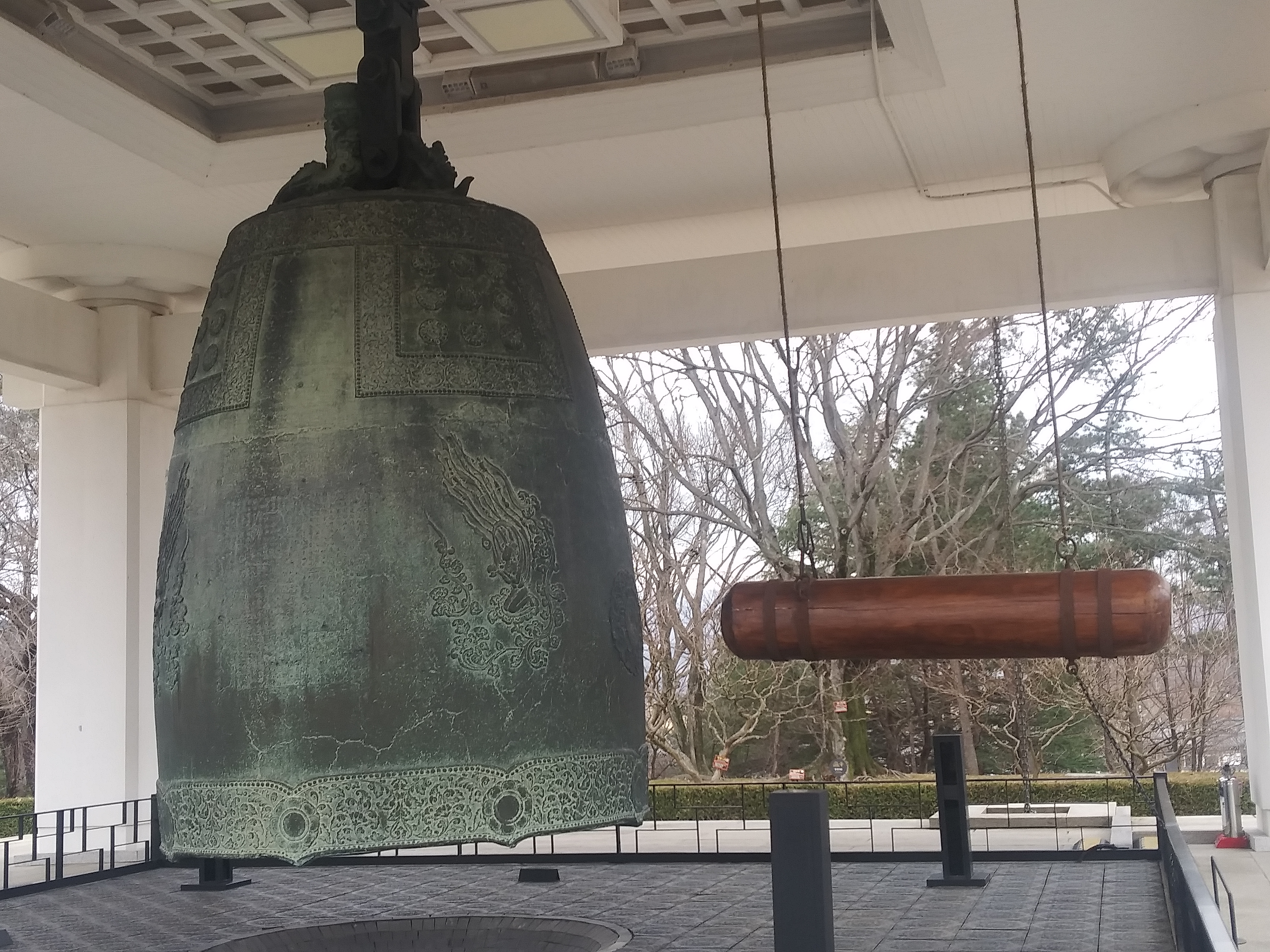
- Bell of King Seongdeok

King of Unified Silla
- Reign: 702–737
- Coronation: 702
- Predecessor: Hyoso of Silla
- Successor: Hyoseong of Silla
- Born: Unknown
- Died: 737; Silla
- Burial: Tomb of King Seongdeok, Gyeongju, South Korea
- Father: Sinmun of Silla
- Mother: Queen Sinmok

- Seongdeok of Silla
- Hangul: 성덕왕
- Hanja: 聖德王
- RR: Seongdeogwang
- MR: Sŏngdŏgwang

Seongdeok Daewang (Korean: 성덕왕; reigned 702–737) was the thirty-third king of the ancient Korean kingdom of Silla. He was the second son of King Sinmun and the younger brother of King Hyoso.

In 704 Seongdeok married Lady Baeso (posthumous Queen Seongjeong), a daughter of Kim Wontae; their son Junggyeong was named Crown Prince in 715. In 716 Seongjeong was dismissed from the palace, and Junggyeong died the following year. In 720 Seongdeok married Queen Sodeok, daughter of the minister Kim Sun-won; their sons included future kings Hyoseong and Gyeongdeok.

== Reign ==
Silla–Tang relations improved markedly in Seongdeok’s time after decades of confrontation. In 733, responding to Tang requests to check Balhae, Silla mobilized forces for a joint campaign; severe winter conditions forced a withdrawal en route. In 735, the Tang court formally recognized Silla’s control of the territory south of the Pae (Taedong) River, consolidating Silla’s northern boundary.

=== Fortifications and defense ===
In 721 Seongdeok ordered the construction of a long defensive wall along Silla’s northern frontier, interpreted in scholarship as a response to Balhae’s southward expansion along the East Sea coast. In 722 a large mountain fortress was built near the capital Gyeongju, known as Gwanmunseong (also Mobeol-gun Fortress); medieval sources report the mobilization of nearly 40,000 workers and a circumference of roughly 12 km.

=== Administration and institutions ===
In 718 the court established the Nugakjeon (漏刻典), an Office of Timekeeping that managed state water clocks; the Samguk sagi records the first making of a water clock (nugak, 漏刻) in the same year. Land policy also evolved: in 722 the state is reported to have first distributed jeongjeon (丁田, “able-bodied fields”) to commoners of working age; although details remain debated, the measure is commonly interpreted as an attempt to stabilize peasant tenure and strengthen royal authority.

=== Death ===
Chinese annals record that in the second lunar month of 737 a Tang envoy was dispatched to invest Seongdeok’s successor (later King Hyoseong), leading some scholars to infer that Seongdeok may have died late in 736.

== Family ==
Parents

- Father: Sinmun of Silla (r. 681–692)
- Mother: Queen Sinmok of the Kim clan

Consorts and issue

- Queen Seongjeong (Kim clan), daughter of Kim Wontae — issue: Crown Prince Kim Junggyeong (d. 717).
- Queen Sodeok (Kim clan), daughter of minister Kim Sun-won — issue: Hyoseong of Silla (r. 737–742); Gyeongdeok of Silla (r. 742–765).

== See also ==
- Unified Silla
- Rulers of Korea
- Bell of King Seongdeok

Seongdeok of Silla House of Kim Died: 737
Regnal titles
Preceded by Hyoso	King of Silla; Silla; 702–737	Succeeded by Hyoseong
