= Bone-rank system =

Caste system in Silla Korea

- Hangul: 골품 제도
- Hanja: 骨品制度
- RR: golpum jedo
- MR: kolp'um chedo

The bone-rank system (Korean: 골품제도) was the system of aristocratic rank used in the ancient Korean kingdom of Silla. It was used to segregate society, and particularly the layers of the aristocracy, on the basis of their hereditary proximity to the throne and the level of authority they were permitted to wield. The idea of royal blood in other societies is a close analogue to the idea of "sacred bone" in Sillan society.

== History ==
Bone rank was strictly hereditary, and thus acted as a caste system. The scholar, Lee Ki-baik (1984, p. 43) considers it to have probably been adopted as part of the administrative law introduced from China and promulgated by King Beopheung in 520. However, this likely did nothing but institute in legal fact what was already a society segregated by bloodline and lineage. Although only two of the five known ranks were referred to as "bone" (골, 骨), the term "bone rank" has become widely used to describe the whole system.

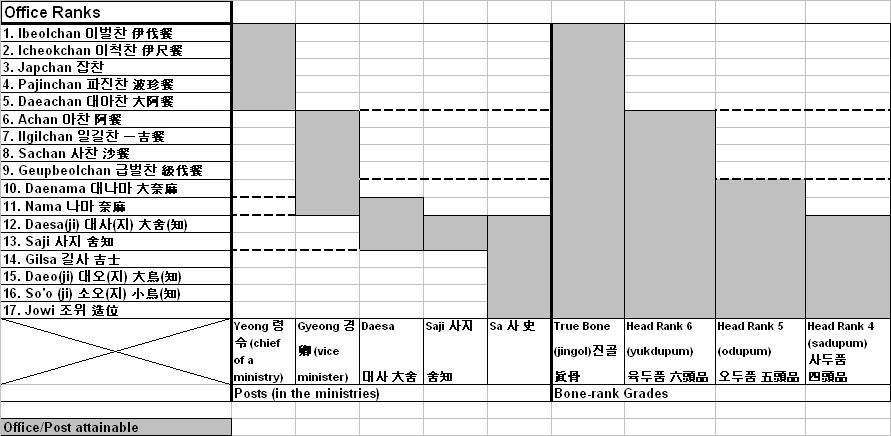
Relationship of Bone-Rank Gradations in Silla to Office Rank and Post

A person's bone rank status governed not only official status and marriage rights, but also the color of one's garments and the maximum dimensions of one's dwelling and carriage. These criteria are described in detail in the 12th century Korean history Samguk Sagi, particularly its Monographs (ji 志), book 2 (ranks and offices). The Samguk Sagi's depiction of Silla life, however, has often been criticized for being excessively static. Unfortunately, since other sources are scarce, it is difficult to judge what sort of changes may have taken place in the bone rank system over the centuries.

Brigham Young University historian Richard McBride writes that the hereditary privileges and social limitations of Sillan society cannot be understood outside the context of the bone-rank system. It had emerged as a means of organizing Silla in the 6th century as a result of Sillan conquests and assimilation of neighboring tribal peoples, polities and communities. All of the early Korean states were socially stratified and based on birth status, but McBride notes that Silla developed systems of social status and ranking far more comprehensive than either Goguryeo or Baekje. Chinese sources such as the Old history of the Tang note the pre-eminence of the Kim and Park families in Silla due to the bone-rank system.

== Rank ==
=== Sacred bone (seonggol) ===
According to Samguk Sagi, "the people of Silla divided the period from Hyeokgeose of Silla to Jindeok of Silla into Sacred Bone (Seonggol), and the king after Muyeol of Silla into True Bone (Jingol). The highest level of the bone rank was the "sacred bone", or seonggol (성골, 聖骨), sometimes termed "hallowed bone" or "holy bone". There is no specific record on exactly what the distinction between the Sacred Bone and the True Bone is set by, but is generally accepted that only the earliest kings were referred to as Seonggol. Because of this closed system of caste, when king Jinpyeong of Silla had no son and male heir whom he could pass the crown to, Queen Seondeok of Silla became the first woman to ascend the throne. Following the death of Queen Jindeok, the last of the Seonggol, she was succeeded by the Jingol-ranked Kim Chun-chu, who ascended the throne as Muyeol of Silla. The Jingol took over the throne for 281 years until Silla's demise.

=== True bone (jingol) ===
Below the sacred bone came the "true bone", or jingol (진골, 眞骨). Members of the true bone could hold any official position, up to the level of full minister. They could also attain office rank up to the highest, ibolchan (이벌찬). After the sacred bone rank was abolished under King Muyeol, only those holding the true bone rank could become a king.

=== Head ranks ===
Below the "true bone" came the head ranks (두품, 頭品), of which only the 6th, 5th and 4th are attested, 6th being the highest. The origins of these lower head rank classes and what defined one‘s status as such are obscure and still debated among scholars. As the jingol were prohibited from marrying into the lower ranks, though they could take concubines from them, it is feasible that one source of the head rank six were the children born from unions between jingol fathers and lower ranking concubines. In any case, members of the head rank six could rise to the position of vice-minister (gyeong, 경, 卿) and as high as the 6th level of office rank, achan (아찬, 阿餐) (two higher ranks of jungachan (중아찬, 重阿餐) and sajung achan (사중아찬, 四重阿餐) were later supplemented to that of achan but these still fell within the 6th level). Members of head ranks four and five could rise only to minor posts. Members of head rank five could reach the 10th level of office rank, daenaema (대내마, 大奈麻), while members of head rank four could attain only the 12th level of office rank, daesa (대사, 大舍). There were 17 levels of office rank (also known as 'capital rank') altogether. One scholar has proposed that, "head-ranks three, two, and one, if they ever formally existed, must have designated the ... non-privileged general populace."

== Evaluations ==
The frustrated ambitions of the head rank six class in particular seem to have played a prominent role in the politics of the late Silla period. Many men of head rank six status, proscribed from rising too high in the Silla administrative system defined by the bone rank system, sought to bypass this by studying Confucianism (either in Silla or abroad in Tang China) or else turned to careers in Buddhism. The most prominent of the head rank six figures was undoubtedly Ch'oe Ch'i-wŏn, who following an illustrious career in China returned to Silla only to see his attempts at administrative reform rebuffed by an entrenched aristocracy. Silla's nobles were protective of their birth status and the bone-rank system was heavily stratified by social status. Historian Richard McBride writes how unlike in medieval Europe, where the children of a nobleman married to a commoner inherited the father's status, in Silla both parents needed to possess true-bone status for their child to be considered true-born. If a true-born man or woman married someone of a lower rank, their children would inherit the rank of the lower-ranking parent. The most famous example of this is the scholar official Sol Chong, who was the son of the Buddhist monk Wonhyo who was head-rank six status and a widowed true-born princess. Despite his mother's royal status, Sol Chong inherited his father's much lower rank.

In the early 10th century the nascent state of Goryeo, which succeeded Goguryeo, tapped into the head rank six intellectuals from Silla and Later Baekje to man its bureaucracy. The bone rank system's extreme rigidity certainly helped to weaken Silla toward the end of the Unified Silla period, although numerous other factors were at play. After the fall of Silla, the bone rank system was abolished entirely by the Goryeo dynasty, although different and somewhat more flexible caste systems persisted until near the end of the Joseon Dynasty in the late 19th century.

== See also ==
- List of Korean family names
- History of Korea
- Three Kingdoms of Korea
- Kabane of feudal Japan, a similar system often seen as derived from the bone-ranks
- Nine-rank system of China
- Songbun, a caste system in modern North Korea

== Bibliography ==
- McBride, Richard (2024), The Three Kingdoms of Korea: Lost Civilizations
