= Silla =

Korean kingdom (57 BCE–935 CE)

Silla 新羅 (Hanja) 신라 (Hangul)
- 57 BCE – 935 CE
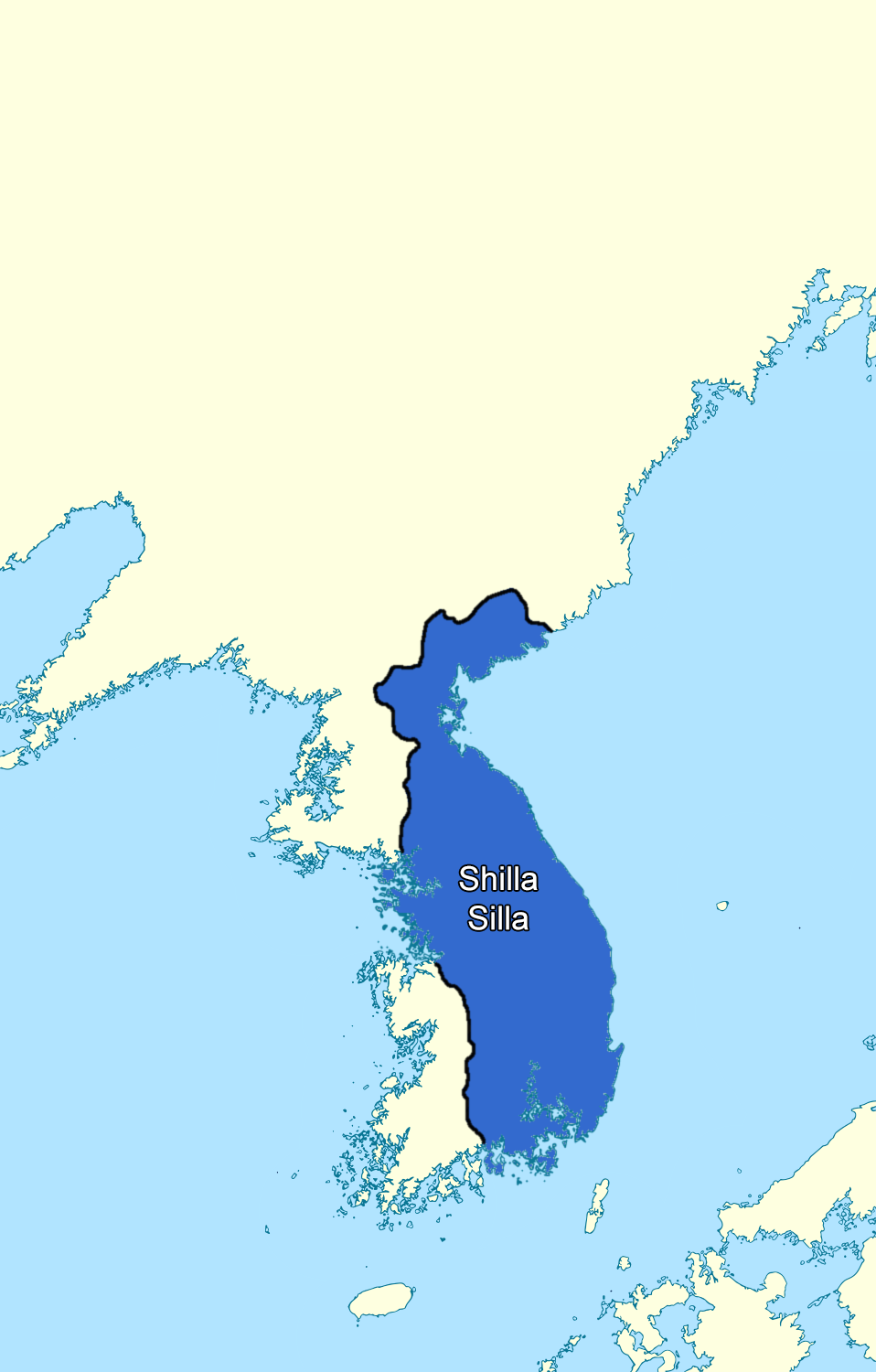
- Silla in the 6th century, during the reign of King Jinheung
- Status: Kingdom
- Capital: Seorabeol (Note: Other name(s): Geumseong (금성; 金城), Saro (사로; 斯盧), Sara (사라; 斯羅), Seonabeol (서나벌; 徐那伐), Seoyabeol (서야벌; 徐耶伐), Seobeol (서벌; 徐伐), Wanggyeong (왕경; 王京)) (Note: With the multiple capitals system; a Supreme capital with one to four secondary capitals (514-c.900))
- Common languages: Old Korean?, Classical Chinese, (literary)
- Ethnic groups: Yemaek; Samhan people
- Religion: Korean ethnic folk religion/Shamanism (Earlier state Religion: 57 BCE – 527 CE); Buddhism (State and official religion 527 CE – 935 CE); Other religions: Confucianism Taoism Islam
- Government: Monarchy
- King
  - 57 BCE–4 CE: Hyeokgeose (first)
  - 57–80: Talhae
  - 356–402: Naemul
  - 540–576: Jinheung
  - 654–661: Muyeol
  - 661–681: Munmu
  - 927–935: Gyeongsun (last)
- Legislature: Hwabaek
- History
  - Establishment: 57 BCE
  - Adoption of Buddhism: 527-528
  - Campaigns of King Jinheung: 551–585
  - Silla-Tang War: 670–676
  - Later Silla: 668–935
  - Handover to the Goryeo: 935 CE

Population
  - 200: 250,000
  - 660: 1,000,000
  - 700: 6,000,000
Preceded by	Succeeded by
Jinhan confederacy; Gojoseon	Unified Silla; Goryeo
- Today part of: North Korea; South Korea

- Silla
- Hangul: 신라
- Hanja: 新羅
- RR: Silla
- MR: Silla
- IPA: [ɕiɭ.ɭa]

Alternate name
- Hangul: 서라벌
- Hanja: 徐羅伐
- RR: Seorabeol
- MR: Sŏrabŏl
- IPA: [sʌɾabʌɭ]

Silla (Korean: 신라; Hanja: 新羅; Old Korean: 徐羅伐, Yale: Syerapel) was a Korean kingdom that existed between 57 BCE and 935 CE and was located on the southern and central parts of the Korean Peninsula. Silla, along with Paekche and Goguryeo, formed the Three Kingdoms of Korea. Silla had the lowest population of the three, approximately 850,000 people (170,000 households), significantly smaller than those of Paekche (3,800,000 people) and Goguryeo (3,500,000 people) and was considered less developed and weaker compared to both Goguryeo and Paekche.

Silla was one of the longest-lasting countries in Korean history. Its foundation can be traced back to the semi-mythological figure of Hyeokgeose of Silla (Old Korean: *pulkunae lit. 'light of the world'), of the Park clan. The country was first ruled intermittently by the Miryang Park clan for 232 years and the Wolseong Seok clan for 172 years and beginning with the reign of Michu Isageum the Gyeongju Kim clan for 586 years. Park, Seok and Kim have no contemporary attestations and went by the Old Korean names of Geoseogan (居西干, 1st century BCE), Chachaung (次次雄, 1st century CE), Isageum (泥師今, Old Korean: *nisokum) and Maripkan (麻立干, 5th–6th century) instead.

It began as a chiefdom in the Jinhan confederacy, part of the Samhan, and after consolidating its power in the immediate area, conquered the Kaya confederacy. Eventually allying with Sui China and then Tang China, it conquered the other two kingdoms, Paekche in 660 and Goguryeo in 668. Thereafter, Unified Silla occupied most of the Korean Peninsula, while the northern part re-emerged as Parhae, a successor-state of Goguryeo. Unified Silla was a prosperous country, and its metropolitan capital of Seorabeol (present-day Gyeongju) was the fourth-largest city in the world at the time. After nearly 1,000 years of rule, Silla fragmented into the brief Later Three Kingdoms of Silla, Later Paekche, and Taebong, handing over power to Goryeo in 935.

== Etymology ==
Until the official adoption of Hanja names for its administration, Silla was recorded using the Hundok reading of Hanja to phonetically approximate its native Korean name, including 斯盧 (사로; Saro), 斯羅 (사라; Sara), 徐那 (伐) (서나[벌]; Seona[beol]), 徐耶 (伐) (서야[벌]; Seoya[beol]), 徐羅 (伐) (서라[벌]; Seora[beol]), and 徐伐 (서벌; Seobeol).

In 504, Jijeung of Silla standardized the characters into 新羅 (신라), which in Modern Korean is pronounced Silla. According to the Samguk sagi, the name of 新羅 (Silla), consisting of the components sin (新), as in deokeopilsin (德業日新) and ra, as in mangrasabang (網羅四方) is thought to be a later Confucian interpretation.

The modern Seoul is a shortened form of Seorabeol, meaning "capital city", and was continuously used throughout the Goryeo and Joseon periods even in official documents, despite the formal name having been Hanyang or Hanseong. The name of the Silla capital changed into its Late Middle Korean form Syeobeul (셔블), meaning "royal capital city," which changed to Syeoul (셔울) soon after, and finally resulted in Seoul (서울) in the Modern Korean language.

The name of either Silla or its capital Seorabeol was widely used throughout Northeast Asia as the ethnonym for the people of Silla, appearing as Shiragi in Japanese and as Solgo or Solho in the language of the medieval Jurchens and their later descendants, the Manchus, respectively. Koreans are still known as Солонгос (Solongos) in Mongolian, which, according to popular folk etymology, is believed to be derived from the Mongolian word for "rainbow" (солонго solongo). In a paper published in 2023 regarding the etymology of the Mongolian word Solongos "Korea, Koreans," the following seven etymological hypotheses regarding the origin of Solongos have been enumerated: (1) It comes from the Mongolian word solongo meaning "rainbow"; (2) It comes from the Mongolian word solongo meaning "weasel"; (3) It comes from the Mongolian/Manchurian ethnonym Solon; (4) It comes from the name of the ancient kingdom of Silla; (5) It comes from Jurchen *Solgo(r) ~ Solho which in turn stems from Old Korean 수릿골 suɾiskol > 솔골 solkol "Goguryeo"; (later) Korea, Korean"; (6) It comes from the Mongolian word solgoi "left, east"; (7) It comes from the name of the medieval kingdom of Goryeo (via *Hoɾyo > *Solo(n)-). The authors of this paper have ended up supporting the sixth hypothesis, i.e. that Mongolian Solongos "Korea, Koreans" ultimately should be cognate with Mongolian soluγai > solγoi "left, wrong side of the body, left-handed, enemy to the east (from the perspective of the Mongols)"."

Silla was also referred to as Gyerim (계림; 鷄林), literally "rooster forest", a name that has its origins in the forest near the Silla capital. Legend has it that the state's founder was born in the same forest, hatched from the egg of a cockatrice (계룡; 雞龍; gyeryong; lit. 'rooster-dragon').

== History ==
=== Founding ===
During the Proto–Three Kingdoms period, central and southern Korea consisted of three confederacies called the Samhan. Silla began as "Saro-guk", a statelet within the 12-member confederacy known as Jinhan. Saro-guk consisted of six clans later known as the Six Clans of Jinhan (진한 6부; 辰韓六部) from Gojoseon.

According to Korean records, Silla was founded by Bak Hyeokgeose of Silla in 57 BCE, around present-day Gyeongju. Hyeokgeose is said to have been hatched from an egg laid from a white horse, and when he turned 13, six clans submitted to him as king and established the kingdom of "Saro (pronounced [si.raʔ] at the time)" which later became the kingdom of Silla. However, this account was not attested during Silla times; Silla epigraphy instead mentions an obscure founding king named "Sŏnghan", while contemporary Chinese writings record that Silla originally consisted of Goguryeo refugees ruled by an unnamed king from Mahan.

In various inscriptions on archaeological founding such as personal gravestones and monuments, it is recorded that Silla royals considered themselves having Xiongnu ancestry through the Xiongnu prince Kim Il-je, also known as Jin Midi in Chinese sources. According to several historians, it is possible that this unknown tribe was originally of Koreanic origin in the Korean Peninsula and joined the Xiongnu confederation. Later the tribe's ruling family returned to Korea from Liaodong peninsula where they thrive, and after coming back to the peninsula they got married into the royal family of Silla. There are also some Korean researchers that point out that the grave goods of Silla and of the eastern Xiongnu are alike, and some researchers insist that the Silla king is descended from Xiongnu. However, scholars such as Richard McBride suggest that this lineage may have been invented in the 7th century to placate Tang China, since no other inscriptions mention the claim.

The Nihon Shoki and Kojiki also mentions Silla as the place where the Japanese god, Susanoo first descended from the heavens after his banishment in a place called "Soshimori" (曽尸茂梨). Up until the liberation of Korea in 1945, Meiji era Japanese historians claimed that Susanoo had ruled over Silla and that the Koreans were the descendants of him, thus finding justification and legitimizing the Japanese occupation of Korea through the use of Nissen dōsoron. According to the Shinsen Shōjiroku, Inahi no Mikoto the brother of the mythological Emperor Jimmu was the ancestor to the kings of Silla. Another source referenced in Samguk sagi claims that a man from the Japanese Archipelago named Hogong helped build the kingdom of Silla.

=== Early period ===
In its early days, Silla started off as a city-state by the name of Saro (사로국; 斯盧國), initially founded by Yemaek refugees from Gojoseon. It also accepted dispersed people fleeing from the Lelang Commandery after Goguryeo's invasion, while later on incorporating native Jin people in the vicinity and Ye people to the North.

Talhae of Silla (57 CE–80 CE) was the son-in-law of Namhae of Silla (4 CE–24 CE). According to the Samguk sagi, Seoktalhae was the prince of Yongseongguk (龍成國) or Dapana (多婆那國), located 1,000-ri (里), northeast of Japan (?). Following the will of Namhae of Silla, he became the fourth king of Silla. One day, he found a low peak next to Mt. Toham (吐含山) and packed it with his own house, and he buried charcoal next to the house of a Japonic official named Hogong (瓠公), who lived there, and deceived him that his ancestors were blacksmiths, but the Hogong family took their home. Hogong was tricked into handing over his house and property to the Seoktalhae. During this period, Kim Al-chi, the ancestor of Gyeongju Kim, was adopted by Talhae of Silla.

The territory outside the capital was greatly conquered during the period of Pasa of Silla (80–112). As soon as he ascended the throne, he ordered officials to encourage agriculture, silkworm farming and train soldiers. There was a territorial dispute between the Eumjipbeol and Siljikgok, and the two countries first asked Pasa of Silla to mediate, Pasa of Silla was handed over to King Suro of Gimhae, who was the local leader at the time. King Suro instead resolved the territorial issue and ruled in favor of Eumjipbeol. However, King Suro sent an assassin to kill the head of the six Silla divisions, who hid in the Eumjipbeol while the assassin was escaping, and King Tachugan (陀鄒干) protected the assassin. In response, Pasa of Silla invaded Eumjipbeol in 102 and Tachugan surrendered, and the Siljikgok and Apdok, which were frightened by Silla, also surrendered. Six years later, it entered the inland area and attacked and merged Dabulguk, Bijigukuk, and Chopalguk.

During the Naehae of Silla period (196–230), the Eight Port Kingdoms War (浦上八國 亂) broke out to determine hegemony in the southern part of the peninsula. In 209, when the "eight upper countries (of the estuary)" (浦上八國) in the Nakdong River basin attacked the Silla-friendly Ara Gaya, the prince of Ara Gaya asked Silla for a rescue army, and the king ordered Crown Prince Seok Uro to gather his troops and attack the eight kingdoms. Crown Prince SeokUro saved Ara Gaya and rescued 6,000 of the pro-Silla Kaya people who had been captured and returned to their homeland. Three years later, three among the eight countries (浦上八國), Golpo-guk, Chilpo-guk, and Gosapo-guk, will launch counterattacks against Silla. A battle took place in Yeomhae, the southeastern part of the capital, and the war ended when the Silla king came out to fight against it, and the soldiers of the three kingdoms were defeated.

By the 2nd century, Silla existed as its own distinct political entity in the southeastern area of the Korean Peninsula. It expanded its influence over the neighboring Jinhan chiefdoms, but throughout the 3rd century was probably no more than the strongest constituent in the Jinhan confederacy.

To the west, Paekche had centralized into a kingdom by about 250 CE, overtaking the Mahan confederacy. To the southwest, Byeonhan was being replaced by the Kaya confederacy. In northern Korea, Goguryeo, founded around 50 CE, destroyed the last Chinese commandery in 313 CE and had grown into the largest regional power.

=== Emergence of a centralized monarchy ===
Naemul of Silla (356–402) of the Kim clan established a hereditary monarchy and took the royal title of Maripgan (麻立干; 마립간). However, in the Samguk sagi, Naemul of Silla still appears as a title of Isageum (泥師今; 이사금). He is considered by many historians as the starting point of the Gyeongju Kim period, which lasted more than 550 years. However, even when the Kim monopolized the throne for more than 500 years, the veneration of the founder Bak Hyeokgeose continued.

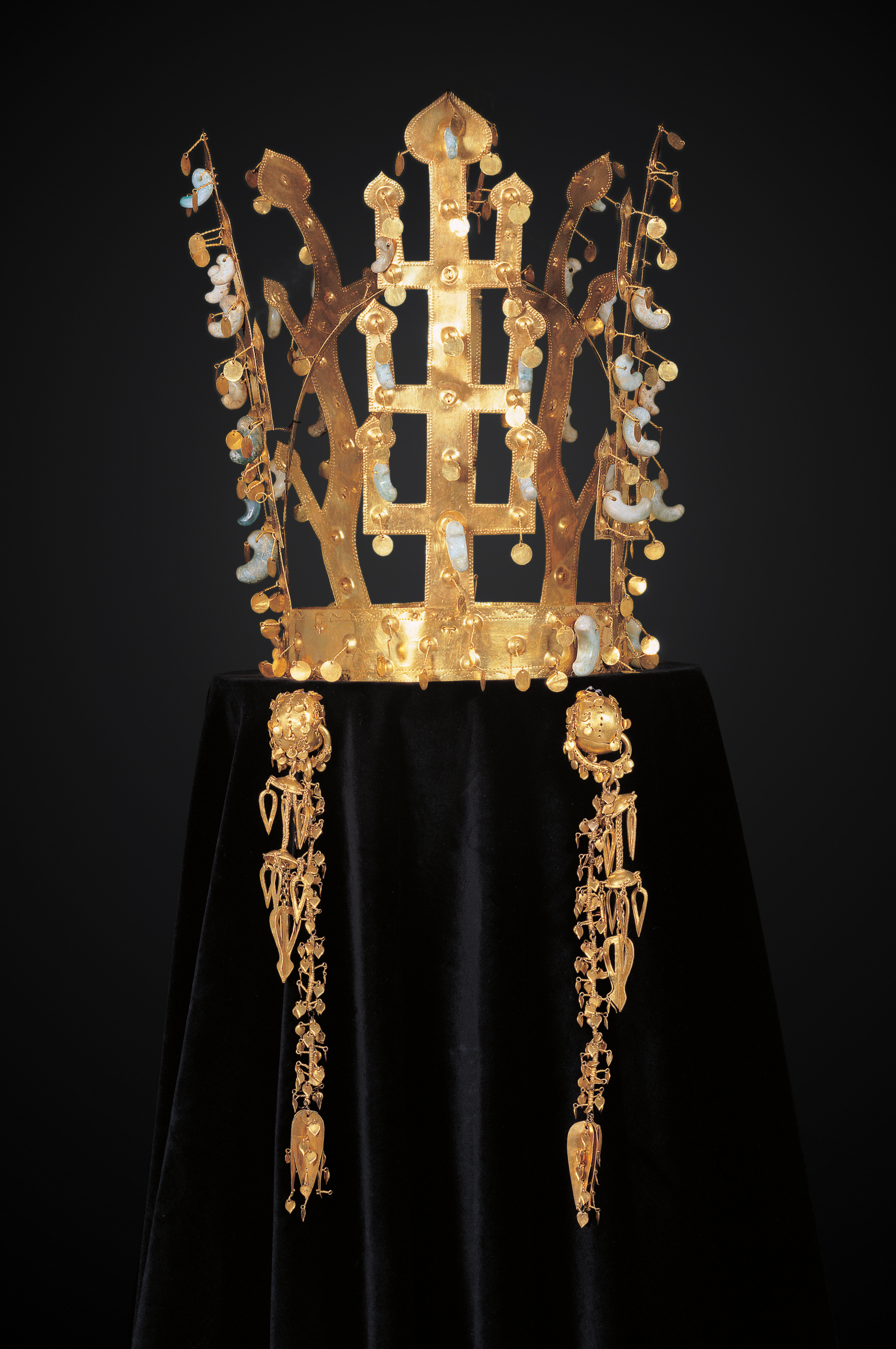
Royal crown of Silla (second half of the fifth century)

In 377, Silla sent emissaries to China and established relations with Goguryeo. Facing pressure from Paekche in the west and Japan in the south, in the later part of the 4th century, Silla allied with Goguryeo. However, after King Gwanggaeto's unification campaign, Silla lost its status as a sovereign country becoming a vassal of Goguryeo. When Goguryeo began to expand its territory southward, moving its capital to Pyongyang in 427, Nulji of Silla was forced to ally with Paekche.

By the time of Beopheung of Silla (514–540), Silla was a full-fledged kingdom, with Buddhism as state religion, and its own Korean era name. Silla absorbed the Kaya confederacy during the Kaya–Silla Wars, annexing Geumgwan Gaya in 532 and conquering Daegaya in 562, thereby expanding its borders to the Nakdong River basin.

Jinheung of Silla (540–576) established a strong military force. Silla helped Paekche drive Goguryeo out of the Han River (Seoul) area, and then wrested control of the entire central western Korea region from Paekche in 553, breaching the 120-year Paekche-Silla alliance. Also, King Jinheung established the Hwarang.

The early period ended with the death of Jindeok of Silla and the demise of the "hallowed bone" (성골; seonggol) rank system.

==== Etymology of title ====
The royal title Maripgan (마립간) is analyzed into two elements in many popular explanations, with the first element alleged to be from the Korean root

- mari (마리) from Middle Korean 마리〮 màlí, "head"/ countable of "head / per head" or "hair"
- mang-rip or mang-nip (網笠), "a traditional-style hat made of horsehair"
- mo-rip (毛笠), "a kind of hat worn by servants in the old days"
- mi-rip or mi-reup, meaning "a knack, a trick, the hang of something"
- madi (맏이) or maji (맏히), meaning "the firstborn, the eldest (child of a family); an elder, a senior, a person whose age is greater than someone else's age"
- mat-jip (맛집), meaning "the house in which the head of a household lives, the main house on an estate"
- mŏrŏ or maru (마루), meaning "ridge, peak, crest (of a roof, a mountain, a wave, etc.); zenith, climax, prime; the first, the standard"
- maru (마루) or mallu, meaning "floor"

or from a word related to Middle Korean marh meaning "stake, post, pile, picket, peg, pin (of a tent)".

The second element, gan (Hangul: 간), is a likely cognate to han (Hangul: 한) and the word for "big, great" keun, first attested as Late Old Korean 黑根 *hùkú-n. Both carry the meaning of "great, leader", which was previously used by the princes of southern Korea, and is sometimes also speculated to have an external relationship with the Mongolic/Turkic title of Khan.

=== Unified Silla ===
In the 7th century, Silla allied itself with the Chinese Tang dynasty. In 660, under Muyeol of Silla (654–661), the Silla–Tang alliance subjugated Paekche after the Paekche–Tang War. In 668, under King Munmu of Silla (King Muyeol's successor) and General Kim Yu-sin, the Silla–Tang alliance conquered Goguryeo to its north after the Goguryeo–Tang War. Silla then fought against the Tang dynasty for nearly a decade to expel Chinese forces on the peninsula intent on creating Tang colonies there to finally establish a unified kingdom as far north as modern Pyongyang. The northern region of the defunct Goguryeo state later reemerged as Parhae.

Silla's middle period is characterized by the rising power of the monarchy at the expense of the jingol nobility. This was made possible by the new wealth and prestige garnered as a result of Silla's unification of the peninsula, as well as the monarchy's successful suppression of several armed aristocratic revolts following early upon unification, which afforded the king the opportunity of purging the most powerful families and rivals to central authority. Further, for a brief period of about a century from the late 7th to late 8th centuries the monarchy made an attempt to divest aristocratic officialdom of their landed base by instituting a system of salary payments, or office land (jikjeon, 직전, 職田), in lieu of the former system whereby aristocratic officials were given grants of land to exploit as salary (the so–called tax villages, or nog-eup, 녹읍, 祿邑).

By the late 8th century, however, these royal initiatives had failed to check the power of the entrenched aristocracy. The mid to late 8th century saw renewed revolts led by branches of the Kim clan which effectively limited royal authority. Most prominent of these was a revolt led by Kim Daegong that persisted for three years. One key evidence of the erosion of kingly authority was the rescinding of the office land system and the re-institution of the former tax village system as salary land for aristocratic officialdom in 757.

In Jinjin and Silla, the king was referred to as Gan, and during the Unified Silla Period, the title "Gan" was also used as Chungji Jagan and Agan.

The middle period of Silla came to an end with the assassination of Hyegong of Silla in 780, terminating the kingly line of succession of Muyeol of Silla, the architect of Silla's unification of the peninsula. Hyegong's demise was a bloody one, the culmination of an extended civil war involving most of the kingdom's high–ranking noble families. With Hyegong's death, during the remaining years of Silla, the king was reduced to little more than a figurehead as powerful aristocratic families became increasingly independent of central control.

Thereafter the Silla kingship was fixed in the house of Wonseong of Silla (785–798), though the office itself was continually contested among various branches of the Kim lineage.

Nevertheless, the middle period of Silla witnessed the state at its zenith, the brief consolidation of royal power, and the attempt to institute a Chinese style bureaucratic system.

=== Decline and fall ===
The final century and a half of the Silla state was one of nearly constant upheaval and civil war as the king was reduced to little more than a figurehead and powerful aristocratic families rose to actual dominance outside the capital and royal court.

The Later Three Kingdoms period (892–936) consisted of Unified Silla and the revival of Baekje and Goguryeo, known historiographically as "Later Baekje" and "Later Goguryeo". During the late 9th century, as Silla declined in power and exorbitant taxes were imposed on the people, rebellions erupted nationwide and powerful regional lords rose up against the waning kingdom.

Later Baekje was founded by the general Kyŏn Hwŏn in 892, and its capital was established in Wansanju (modern Jeonju). The kingdom was based in the southwestern regions in the former territories of Baekje. In 927, Later Baekje attacked Gyeongju, the capital of Unified Silla, and placed a puppet on the throne. Eventually, Kyŏn Hwŏn was ousted by his sons due to a succession dispute and escaped to Goryeo, where he served as a general in the conquest of the kingdom he personally founded.

Later Goguryeo was founded by the Buddhist monk Kung Ye in 901, and its original capital was established in Songak (modern Kaesong). The kingdom was based in the northern regions, which were the strongholds of Goguryeo refugees. Later Goguryeo's name was changed to Majin in 904, and Taebong in 911. In 918, Wang Kŏn, a prominent general of Goguryeo descent, deposed the increasingly despotic and paranoid Kung Ye, and established Goryeo. By 936, Goryeo conquered its rivals and achieved the unification of the Later Three Kingdoms.

=== Restoration movements ===
Despite its destruction and annexation by Goryeo, for nearly three centuries loyalty to the old Silla kingdom and Silla traditions remained latent in the Kyŏngju area. Silla restoration revolts include those led by Yi Ŭimin in 1186 and by Kim Sami in 1193 as well as later revolts in 1202.

== Society and politics ==
Bone Rank System
True Bone	Sixth Head	Fifth Head	Fourth Head
Ibeolchan			
Ichan			
Japchan			
Pajinchan			
Dae-achan			
	Achan		
	Ilgilchan		
	Sachan		
	Geupbeolchan		
		Dae-Nama	
		Nama	
			Daesa
			Saji
			Gilsa
			Dae-oh
			So-oh
			Jowi

From at least the 6th century, when Silla acquired a detailed system of law and governance, social status and official advancement were dictated by the bone rank system. This rigid lineage-based system also dictated clothing, house size, and the permitted range of marriage.

Since its emergence as a centralized polity Silla society had been characterized by its strict aristocratic makeup. Silla had two royal classes: "sacred bone" (seonggol, 성골, 聖骨) and "true bone" (jingol, 진골, 眞骨). Up until the reign of King Muyeol this aristocracy had been divided into "sacred bone" and "true bone" aristocrats, with the former differentiated by their eligibility to attain the kingship. This duality had ended when Queen Jindeok, the last ruler from the "sacred bone" class, died in 654. The numbers of "sacred bone" aristocrats had been decreasing for generations, as the title was only conferred to those whose parents were both "sacred bones", whereas children of a "sacred" and a "true bone" parent were considered as "true bones". There were also many ways for a "sacred bone" to be demoted to a "true bone", thus making the entire system even more likely to collapse eventually.

The king (or queen) theoretically was an absolute monarch, but royal powers were somewhat constrained by a strong aristocracy. Notably, Silla was unique in having female monarchs. There were, for example, three reigning Sillan female "kings" (yeouang, 여왕), distinct from queens who were merely the consorts of male rulers. Descent also continued to be traced through both paternal and maternal lines throughout the Sillan era, suggesting women enjoyed a relatively high status compared to other contemporary East Asian states.

The "Hwabaek" (화백,和白) served as royal council with decision-making authorities on some vital issues like succession to the throne or declarations of war. The Hwabaek was headed by a person (Sangdaedeung) chosen from the "sacred bone" rank. One of the key decisions of this royal council was the adoption of Buddhism as state religion.

Following unification Silla began to rely more upon Chinese models of bureaucracy to administer its greatly expanded territory. This was a marked change from pre-unification days when the Silla monarchy stressed Buddhism, and the Silla monarch's role as a "Buddha-king". Another salient factor in post-unification politics were the increasing tensions between the Korean monarchy and aristocracy.

== Military ==
The early Silla military was built around a small number of Silla royal guards designed to protect royalty and nobility and in times of war served as the primary military force if needed. Due to the frequency of conflicts between Paekche and Goguryeo as well as Yamato Japan, Silla created six local garrisons one for each district. The royal guards eventually morphed into "sworn banner" or Sodang units. In 625 another group of Sodang was created. Garrison soldiers were responsible for local defense and also served as a police force.

A number of Silla's greatest generals and military leaders were Hwarang (equivalent to the Western knights or chevaliers). Originally a social group, due to the continuous military rivalry between the Three Kingdoms of Korea, they eventually transformed from a group of elite male aristocratic youth into soldiers and military leaders. Hwarang were key in the fall of Goguryeo (which resulted in the unification of the Korean Peninsula under Unified Silla) and the Silla–Tang Wars, which expelled Tang forces in the other two Korean kingdoms.

Silla is known to have operated crossbows called the Cheonbono (천보노) that was said to have had a range of one thousand steps and a special pike unit called the Jangchang-Dang (장창당) to counter enemy cavalry. In particular, Silla's crossbows were prized by Tang China due to its excellent functions and durability. Silla would later employ special crossbow units against its Korean counterparts such as Goguryeo and Paekche, as well as the Tang dynasty during the Silla–Tang War. The pike unit, called Changchangdang that would later be known as the Bigeum Legion (비금서당) as part of the Nine Legions (구서당) and which was consisted of Silla folks, had a special purpose to counter the Göktürks cavalries operated by the Tang army during the Silla-Tang War.

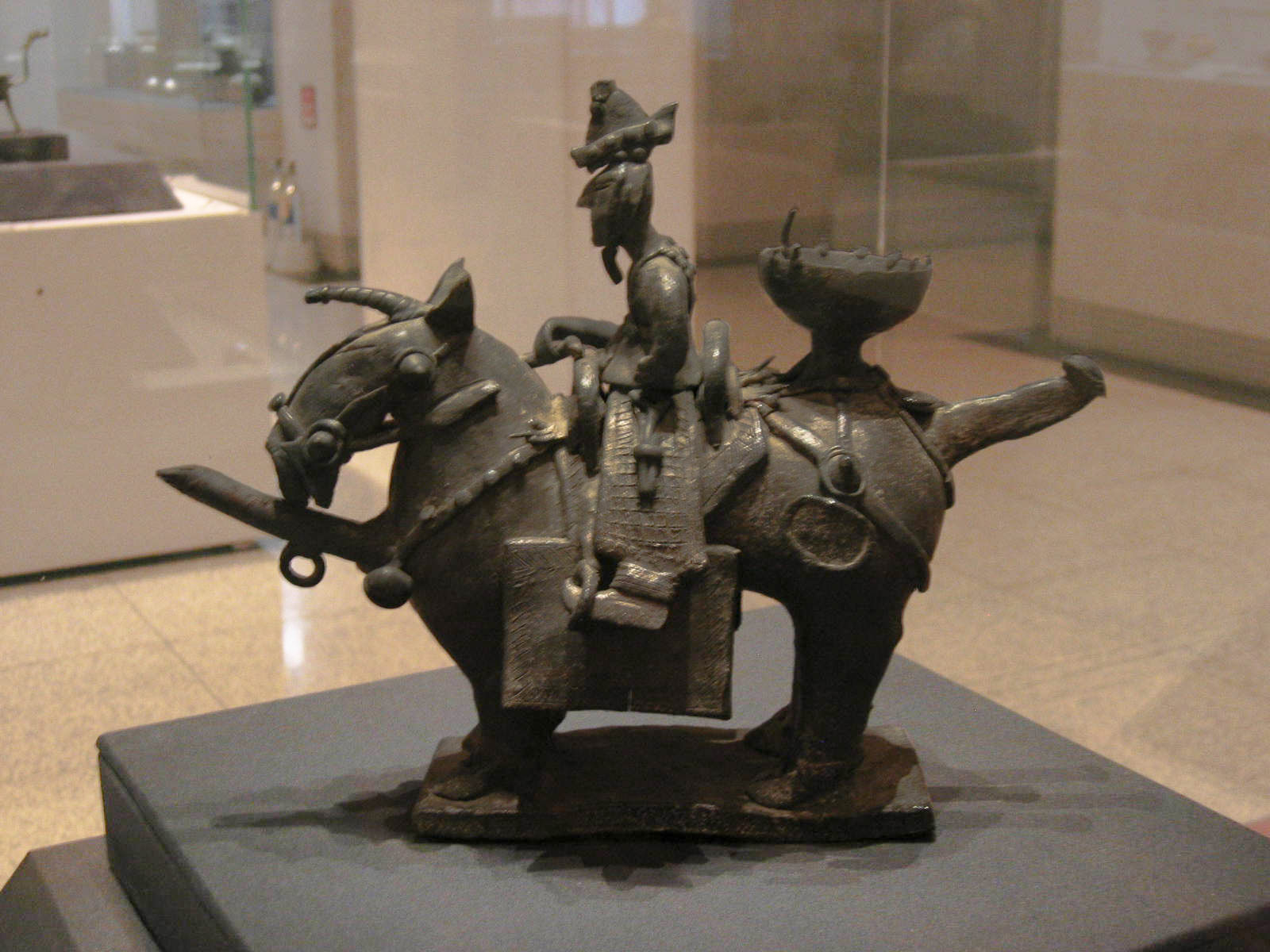
Earthenware Funerary Objects in the Shape of a Silla Warrior on Horseback

In addition, Silla's central army, the Nine Legions (구서당), consisted of Silla, Goguryeo, Paekche, and Mohe people. These nine legions aimed at defending the capital became complete in formation and compilation after Silla unified the Three Kingdoms. The Legions were known for their representative colors marked on their collars and were constituted by different groups. The Golden, Red, and Dark Blue Legion employed Goguryeoans while the Blue and White Legion accepted Paekche folks into their ranks. The Bigeum (also Red in color), Green, and Purple Legion were formed by Sillan people whilst the Black Legion took dispersed Mohe refugees into their fold that came along with Goguryeo refugees after the Fall of Goguryeo.

Silla is also known for its maritime prowess shown by the navy backed with master shipbuilding and seamanship. The boats employed were usually called Sillaseon (신라선), which had an international reputation for its solid durability and effective capabilities that were said to 'enable men surf across the biggest of waves' amongst the Chinese and Japanese according to the Shoku Nihon Koki. During the Silla-Tang War, the Silla navy under the command of general Sideuk defeated the Tang Navy 22 times out of 23 engagements in Gibeolpo, today's Seocheon County. Jang Bogo, a prominent maritime figure of Silla, was also famous for his navy based on the Cheonghaejin Garrison.

== Culture ==
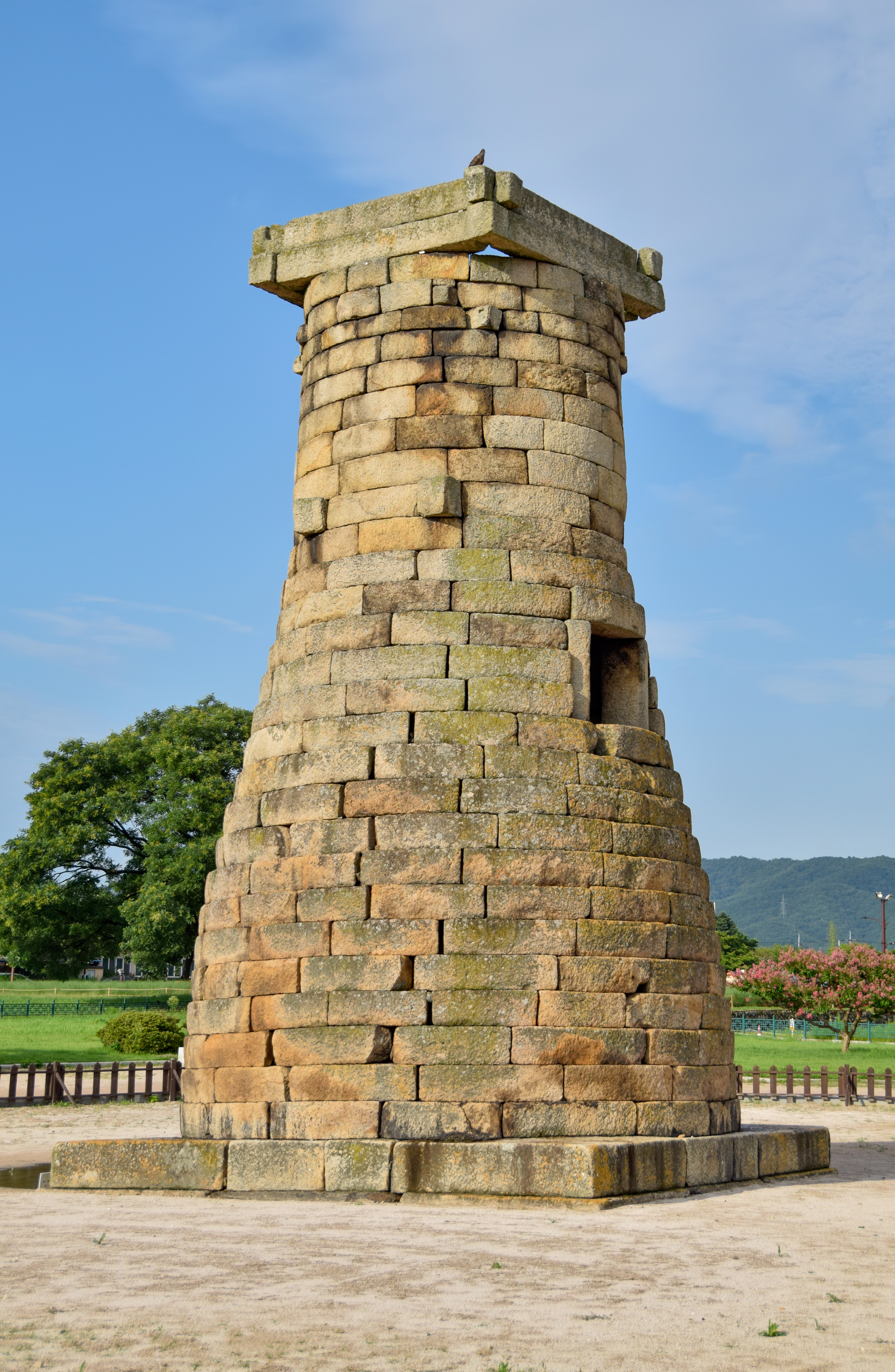
The astronomical observatory Cheomseongdae

A significant number of Silla tombs can still be found in Gyeongju, the capital of Silla. Silla tombs consist of a stone chamber surrounded by a soil mound. The historic area around Gyeongju was added to the UNESCO World Heritage list in 2000. Much of it is also protected as part of Gyeongju National Park. Additionally, two villages near Gyeongju named Hahoe and Yangdong Folk Village were submitted for UNESCO heritages in 2008 or later by related cities and the South Korean government. Since the tombs were harder to break into than those of Paekche, a larger number of objects has been preserved. Notable amongst these are Silla's elaborate gold crowns and jewelry.

The massive Bronze Bell of King Seongdeok the Great of Silla is known to produce a distinctive sound. Cheomseongdae near Gyeongju is the oldest extant astronomical observatory in East Asia but some disagree on its exact functions. It was built during the reign of Queen Seondeok (632–647).

It was from Silla that Korea's oldest extant genre of poems, known as hyangga, developed and were recorded. Additionally, among the three kingdoms, Silla has the best preserved ancient Korean literature written in Classical Chinese, which includes the hanshi poetry of Ch'oe Ch'i-wŏn, as well as the travelogue of Buddhist monk Hyecho.

Muslim traders brought the name "Silla" to the world outside the traditional East Asian sphere through the Silk Road. Geographers of the Arab and Persian world, including ibn Khurdadhbih, al-Masudi, Dimashiki, Al-Nuwayri, and al-Maqrizi, left records about Silla.

The current descendants to the Silla dynasty fall under the Park name. Family records since the last ruler have been provided, but these records have yet to be fully verified.

=== Native ethnic religion/Shamanism/Animism ===
The ancient indigenous native religion of Korea presented one of the most important aspects in early Korean society and involved the very lives of its people as well of its culture. One of the key features is the belief in the spirits of nature, that inhabit all the things in existence. Its presence is seen in Korean culture itself and could be considered inseparable from it, from cultural and national festivals such as Seollal and Chuseok, to many practices within Korean Buddhism that originate from it.

The ethnic religion of Silla was a key element within the Silla state and constituted the State religion around which many of the national rites, festivals and ceremonies revolved around. The ruler of Silla was simultaneously its religious head and one of the most revered figures in the nation, having a near deity/saint like status due to their descendance from the spirits of the skies. The title of the second ruler of Silla, Nurye "Yuri" Isageum, called Chachaung was one of the high shamans of the state for example.

The ruler together with his sister (serving as a high ranking shamaness figure only second to the ruler) also performed the national ceremonies to support the nation in upcoming times. Silla's nationalism focused on the struggle for survival against the much more powerful neighbours of Goguryeo and Paekche.

The Hwarang order had its origin in Silla's native religion as well, where the youth would strive to fight for their country and monarch. They would embark on nationalistic pilgrimages to seek out the spirits, who would grant them powers to vanquish their enemies. The Hwarang segi is one of the manuscripts that give insight into their lives and practices.

Springs and Mountains are some of the sources, where the spirits of life originate from, who sometimes take on the form of animals and girls.

When Silla adopted Buddhism, the previous ethnic religion was syncretized with the new faith and largely became synonymous to it. Buddhist deities are often treated the same way deities from the native religion are. Buddhism subsequently also found its way into native folk beliefs.

Shamanism remained important well into the Goryeo period, with a nativist uprising nominally led by a Buddhist court monk named Myocheong occurring in the 12th century.

The national festivals of Goryeo, Palgwanhoe and Yeondeunghoe, while they were Buddhist festivals were originally native shamanistic ones.

During Joseon shamans were still reached out to by the common folk, who for example often went to them to decide the names of their kids.

=== Buddhism ===
Centuries after Buddhism emerged in India, the strand called Mahayana Buddhism spread out of Central Asia, modern-day Afghanistan, and arrived in Silla the very last out of Goguryeo and Paekche due to its geographic isolation. In Korea, it was adopted as the state religion of 3 constituent polities of the Three Kingdoms Period, first by Goguryeo in 372 CE, by Silla in 528 CE, and by Paekche in 552 CE. Buddhism was introduced much more reluctantly compared to the two others to Silla in 528. Silla had been exposed to the religion for over a century during which the faith had certainly made inroads into the native populace and mixed with the native Shamanist and Animist folk religion to form the Korean specific form of Buddhism. The Buddhist monk Ado introduced Silla to Buddhism when he arrived to proselytize in the mid 5th century. The Samguk yusa and Samguk sagi following 3 monks among the first to bring Buddhist teaching, or Dharma, to Korea: Malananta (late 4th century) – an Indian Buddhist monk who brought Buddhism to King Chimnyu of Paekche in the southern Korean Peninsula in 384, Sundo – a Chinese Buddhist monk who brought Buddhism to Goguryeo in northern Korea in 372, and Ado – a Buddhist monk who brought Buddhism to Silla in central Korea. However, according to legend, the Silla monarchy was convinced to adopt the faith only by the martyrdom of the Silla general Ichadon, who was executed for his Buddhist faith by the Silla monarch in 527 only to have his blood flow the color of milk.

The importance of Buddhism in Silla society of the late early period is difficult to exaggerate. From King Beopheung and for the following six reigns Silla kings adopted Buddhist names and came to portray themselves as Buddhist–kings.

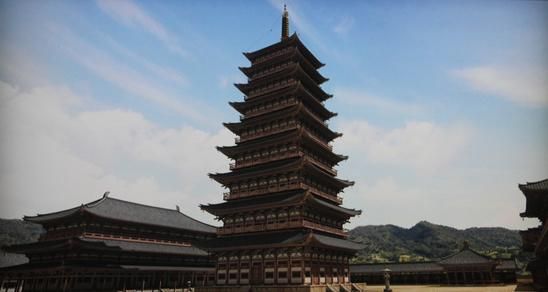
The Temple of the Golden Dragon, also known as Hwangryongsa, was destroyed during the Mongol Invasions.

By the time of the 7th century, Buddhism in Korea reached its golden age with the advent of prominent, elite scholar-monks such as Wonhyo, Uisang, and Jajang that influenced East Asian philosophy and played pivotal roles in laying key ideas within East Asian Buddhism like Essence-Function. With the support of the government, massive temples like the Temple of the Golden Dragon, Temple of the Buddhist Realms and hermitages like Seokguram were built across the nation. Buddhist ideals and practices permeated the people's daily lives regardless of class and the court, as well as the government, actively promoted Buddhism as a symbol of patriotism in times of invasions. The main assessment is that relics and temple ruins related to Silla found today were ahead of their time and surpassed those of Goryeo and Joseon in terms of size and extravagancy. Many Sillan monks who were part of the elite caste chose to expand their experience and knowledge by studying abroad in Tang China or travelling far west to India. Hyecho, known for his travelogue "An Account of Travel to the Five Indian Kingdoms", was one of the many Korean monks that ventured to territories west to China yet to be visited by Koreans at that time.

Silla's strong Buddhist nature is also reflected by the thousands of remnant Buddhist stone figures and carvings, mostly importantly on Namsan. The international influence of the Tang dynasty on these figures and carvings can be witnessed in the hallmarks of a round full form, a stern expression of the face, and drapery that clings to the body, but stylistic elements of native Korean culture can still be identified.

== Foreign relations ==
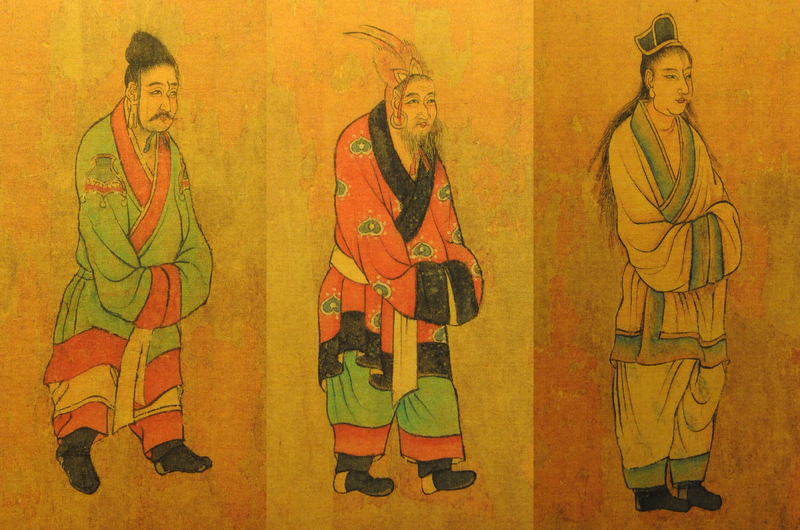
(left to right) A Paekche, Goguryeo, and Silla envoy depicted in a 6th-century painting.

Korea's and Iran's long-running relationship started with cultural exchanges dating back to the Three Kingdoms of Korea era, more than 1600 years ago by the way of the Silk Road. A dark blue glass was found in the Cheonmachong Tomb, one of Silla's royal tombs unearthed in Gyeongju. An exotic golden sword was found in Gyerim-ro, a street also located in Gyeongju. These are all relics that are presumed to be sent to Silla from ancient Iran or Persia through the Silk Road. Other items uncovered during the excavation include a silver bowl engraved with an image of the Persian goddess Anahita; a golden dagger from Persia; clay busts; and figurines portraying Middle Eastern merchants.

It was only during the Goryeo dynasty during Hyeonjeong's reign when trade with Persia was officially recorded in Korean history. But in academic circles, it is presumed that both countries had active cultural exchanges during the 7th century Silla era which means the relationship between Korea and Iran began more than 1,500 years ago. "In a history book written by the Persian scholar Khurdadbid, it states that Silla is located at the eastern end of China and reads 'In this beautiful country Silla, there is much gold, majestic cities and hardworking people. Their culture is comparable with Persia'. Samguk Sagi— the official chronicle of the Three Kingdoms era, compiled in 1145—contains further descriptions of commercial items sold by Middle Eastern merchants and widely used in Silla society. The influence of Iranian culture was profoundly felt in other ways as well, most notably in the fields of music, visual arts, and literature. The popularity of Iranian designs in Korea can be seen in the widespread use of pearl-studded roundels and symmetrical, zoomorphic patterns.

An ancient Persian epic poem, the Kushnameh, contains detailed descriptions of Silla. Former South Korean president Park Geun-hye said during a festival celebrating Iran and Korea's 1,500 years of shared cultural ties, "The Kushnameh, that tells of a Persian prince who went to Silla in the seventh century and got married with a Korean princess, thus forming a royal marriage."

Silla also traded indirectly with the Roman Empire through the Silk Road. Many Roman relics were excavated from the royal tombs of Silla, and it is presumed that Roman glass was a particularly popular luxury product among the high-ranking class. The Silla tombs where Roman glass has been proven to have been excavated include Geumnyeong Tomb, Cheonma Tomb, Hwangnamdae Tomb (National Treasure No. 193), and Nambun Tomb No. 98.

Silla was also a place of interest by the Japanese as the Nihon Shoki and the Kojiki both claim that the Japanese god, Susanoo (brother of Amaterasu) first emerged from the kingdom of Silla after being banished from the heavens, but soon left the peninsula for the Japanese archipelago after being dissatisfied with the land. He was also used as a means of spreading propaganda through Nissen dōsoron that Susanoo once reigned over Silla and that the modern Koreans are his descendants (in turn the Japanese), ultimately using him to justify the Japanese occupation of Korea.

== Gallery ==
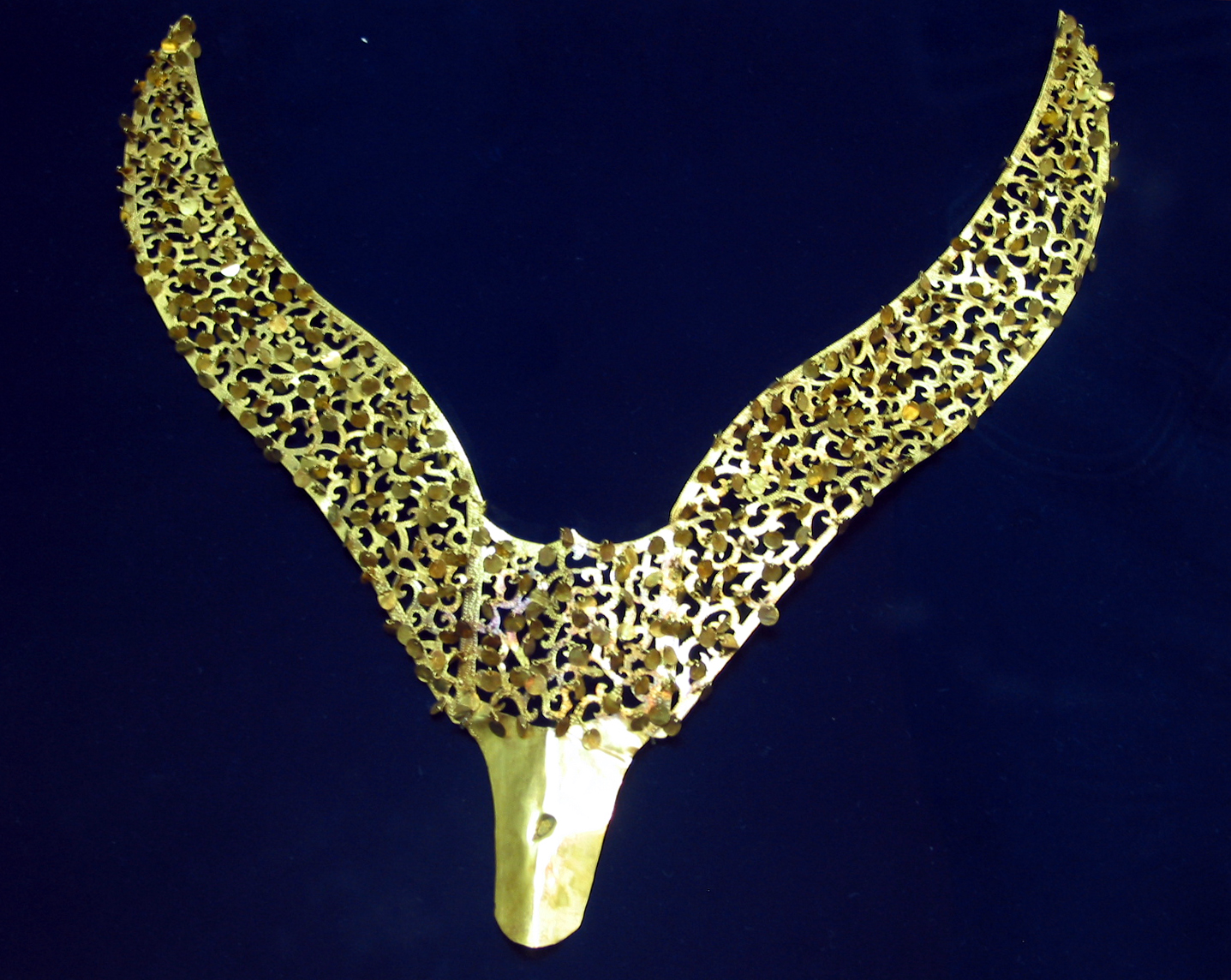
Gold ornament from early Silla

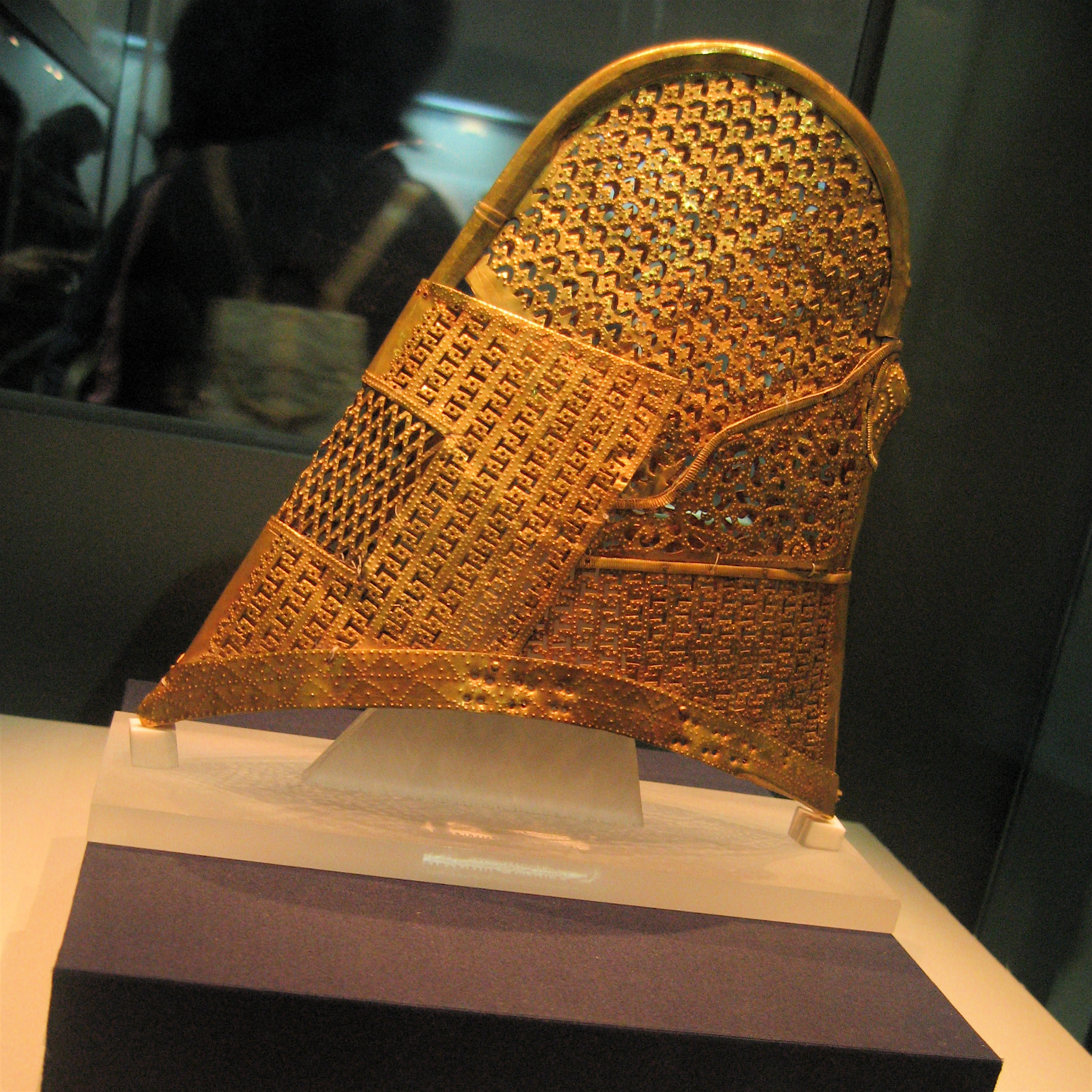
A golden inner cap, 5–6th century Silla

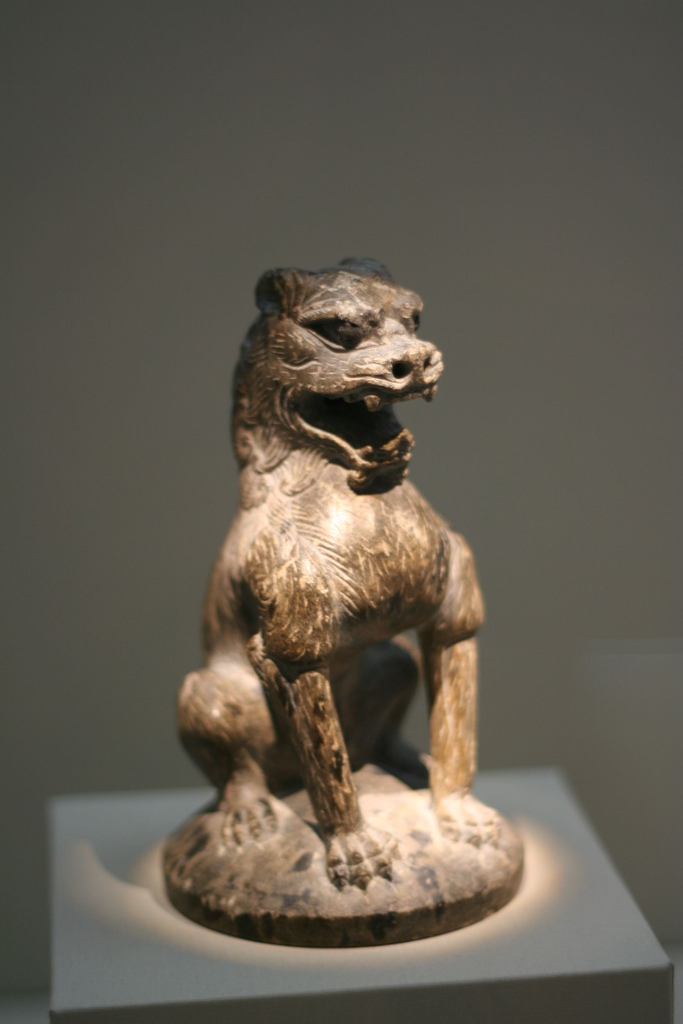
An artifact from Silla

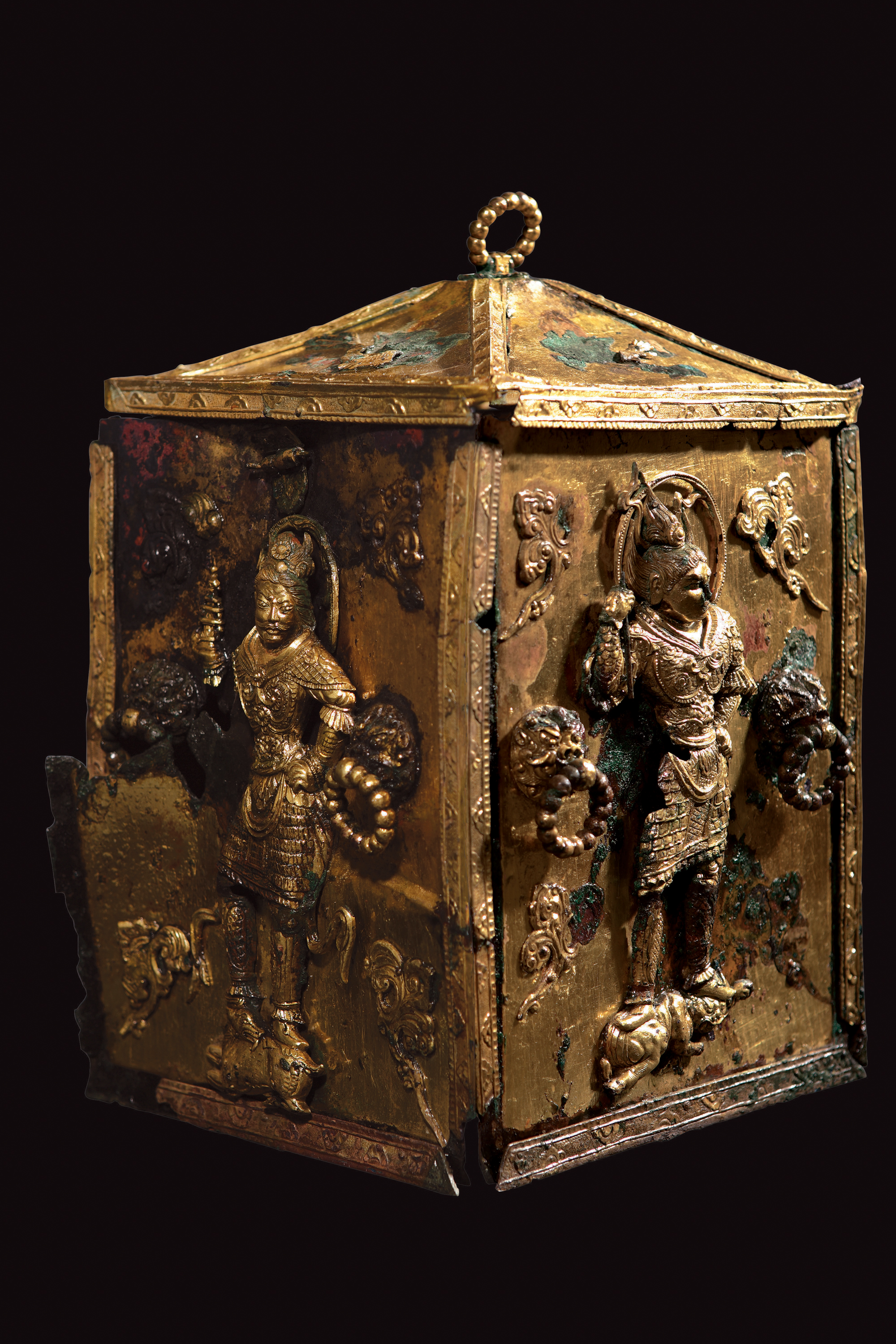
Reliquary from 7th century Silla

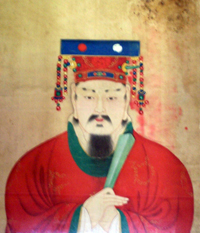
The last king of Silla, King Gyeongsun (r. 927–935)

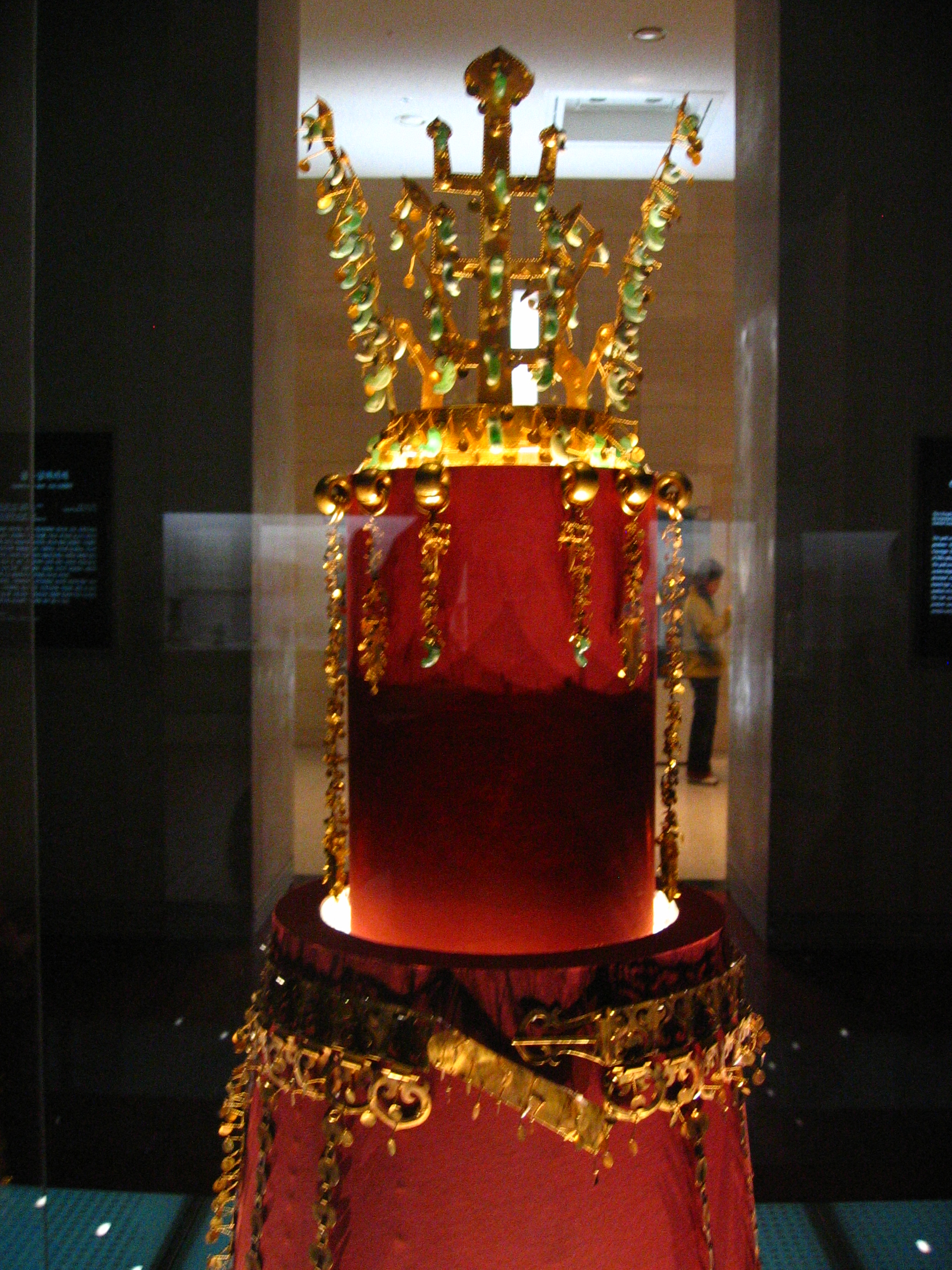
A crown from late 5th or early 6th Silla

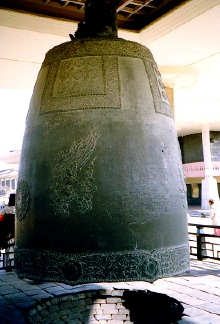
The Bell of King Seongdeok was cast in 771 AD.

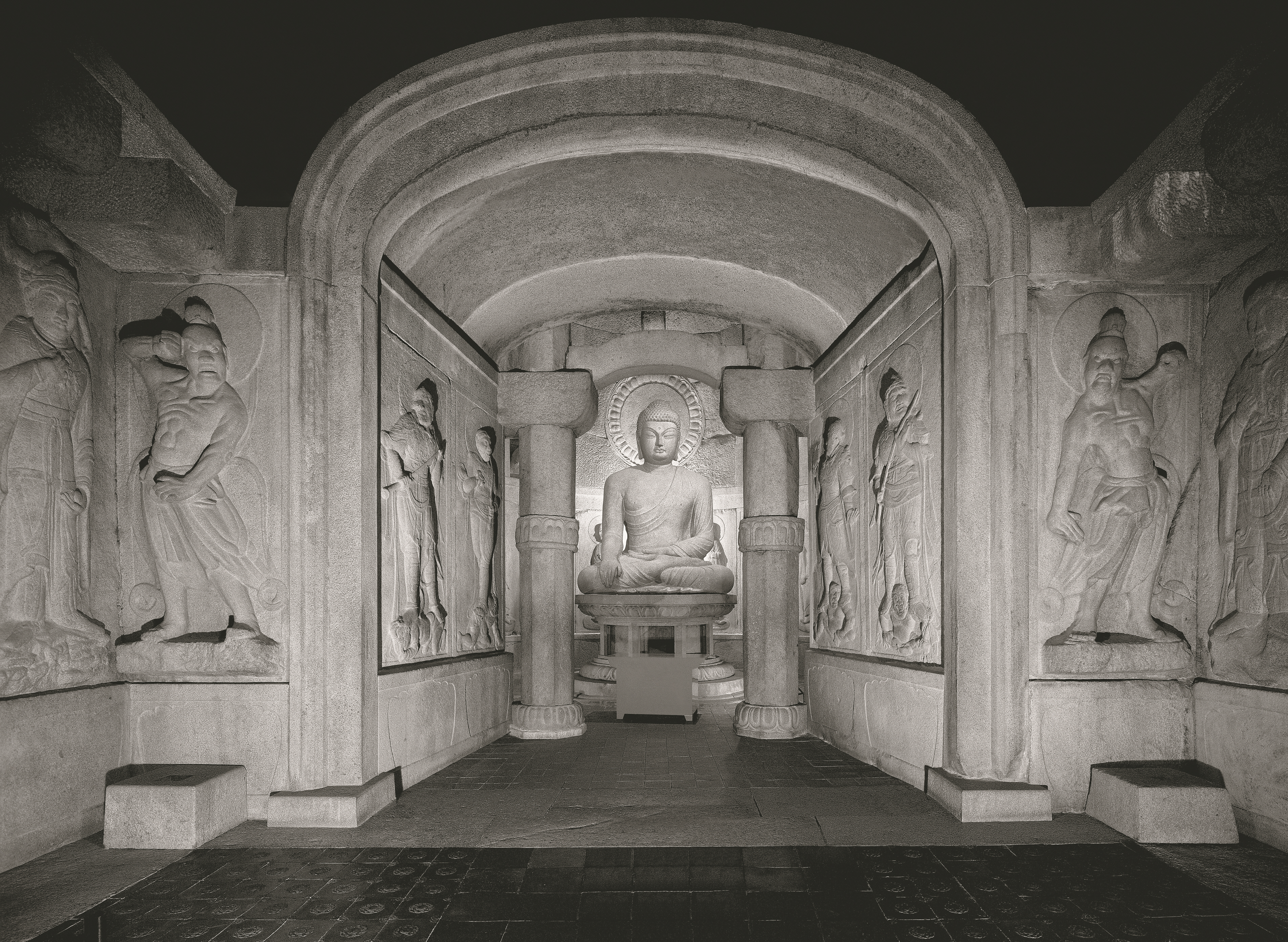
Seokguram

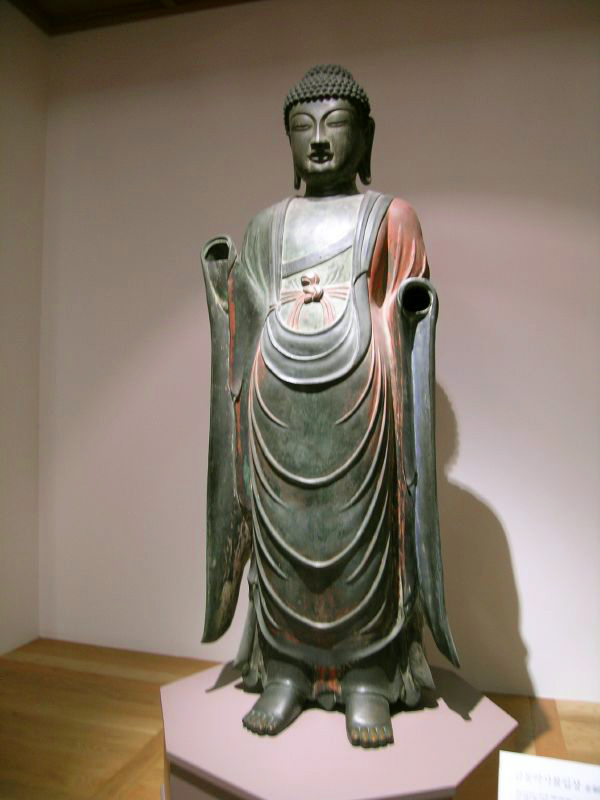
This standing statue of the Bhaisajyaguru Buddha is made of gilt bronze, made in the Silla period.

== See also ==
- Crowns of Silla
- Gyeongju National Museum
- History of Korea
- List of Silla people
- Silla monarchs family tree
