= History of Gyeongju =

History of South Korean city

Gyeongju is a coastal city in the far southeastern corner of North Gyeongsang province in South Korea. It is the second largest city by area in the province after Andong, covering 1,324 square kilometres (511 mi^{2}) with a population of 269,343 people according to the 2008 census. The early history of Gyeongju is closely tied to that of the Silla kingdom, of which it was the capital for nearly one thousand years.

== Silla period ==
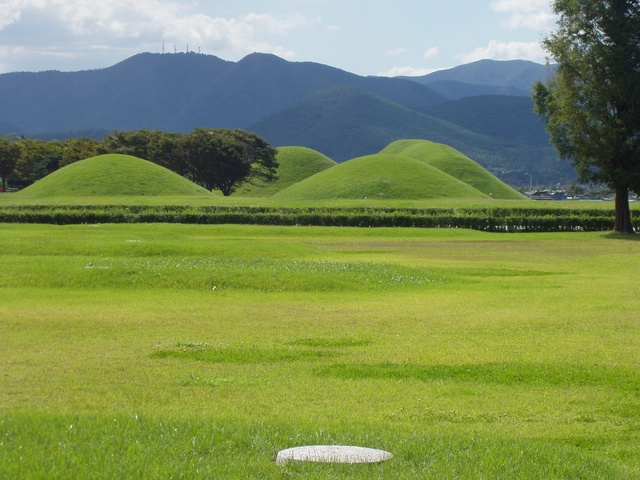
Burial mounds of the Silla kings

Gyeongju first enters non-Korean records during the Samhan period in the early Common Era. It is recorded in Chinese records as Saro-guk, one of twelve petty states which comprised the Jinhan confederacy. Saro-guk would later become the Silla kingdom. Korean records, probably based on the dynastic chronicles of Silla, record that Saro-guk was established in 57 BCE, when six small villages in the Gyeongju area united under Bak Hyeokgose, the kingdom's first ruler. During the Silla period, the city was called "Seorabeol" (서라벌; 西羅伐) that is assumed to mean Capital, "Gyerim which literally means Rooster's forest," or "Geumseong" (금성; 金成) that refers to "City of Gold".

After the unification of the peninsula up to Taedong River in 668 AD, Gyeongju became the center of Korean political and cultural life. The city was home to the Silla court, and the great majority of the kingdom's elite. Its prosperity became legendary, and was reported as far away as Persia according to the 9th century book, The Book of Roads and Kingdoms. Records of Samguk Yusa give the city's population in its peak period as 178,936 households, suggesting that the total population was almost one million. Many of Gyeongju's most famous sites date from this period, known as Unified Silla.

However, the city's prosperity proved short-lived. In the late 9th century the Silla kingdom declined and fell apart, giving way to the Later Three Kingdoms of Korea. In 927 Gyeongju was pillaged by Hubaekje, one of these later kingdoms. Shortly thereafter, King Gyeongsun surrendered his title and country to Taejo in 935, who had established the Goryeo dynasty in 918. Gyeongju was no longer the capital of a united Korea, while Gaegyeong (modern-day Kaesong) took that title.

== Goryeo and Joseon periods ==
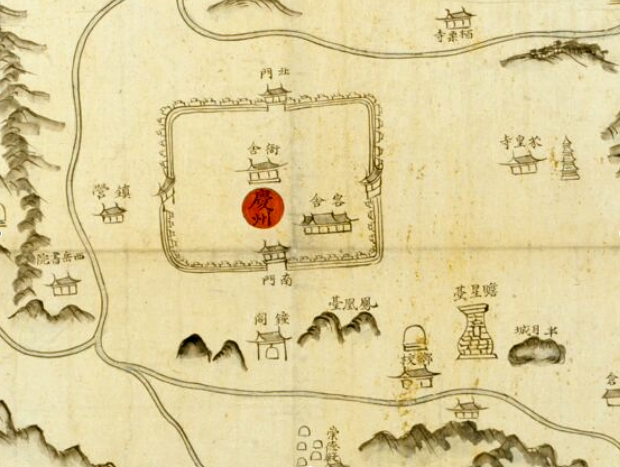
Landmarks of Gyeongju are shown on a map made between the late 17th century and mid-18th century.

Under the Goryeo dynasty (935–1392), Gyeongju was no longer of national importance. However, it remained a regional center. The city was given its modern name "Gyeongju" by King Taejo in 940, and was made the seat of Yeongnam Province. It had jurisdiction over a wide area, including much of east-central Yeongnam.

Gyeongju was designated the "Eastern Capital" in 987, but that title was removed in 1012. For much of the Goryeo period, it was also the seat of the Andong Daedohobu, the Great Protectorate of the East, which oversaw military affairs for much of eastern and central Korea. However, it was stripped of this distinction as well in the 13th century, after bloody rebellions connected with the Silla restoration movement broke out in the area. At the same time, its boundaries were considerably reduced. (Note: . Also mentioned in.)

During the Joseon period (1392–1910), the city declined yet further. It ceased to occupy a central position as the Great Yeongnam Road became the Gyeongsang province's chief artery. This road connected Seoul to the southeastern port of Dongnae (in modern-day Busan) without passing near Gyeongju. In 1601, the provincial capital passed to Daegu, which was located on the main road.

Over these centuries, the city's relics suffered numerous assaults. In the 13th century, Mongol forces destroyed a nine-story wooden pagoda at Hwangnyongsa. During the Imjin War (1592–1598), the Gyeongju area became a heated battlefield and Japanese forces burned the wooden structures at Bulguksa. Not all damage was due to invasions, however. In the early Joseon period, a great deal of damage was done to Buddhist sculptures on Namsan by Neo-Confucian radicals, who hacked arms and heads off statuary.

== Since 1900 ==
The city's boundaries and designation changed several times in the 20th century. From 1895 to 1955, the area was known as Gyeongju-gun ("Gyeongju County"). In the first decades of the century, the city center was known as Gyeongju-myeon, signifying a relatively rural area. In 1931, the downtown area was designated Gyeongju-eup, in recognition of its increasingly urban nature. In 1955, Gyeongju-eup became Gyeongju-si ("Gyeongju City"), the same name as today but with a much smaller area. The remainder of Gyeongju-gun became "Wolseong County." The county and city were reunited in 1995, creating Gyeongju City as we know it today.

From the 1900s (decade) to the early 1970s, Gyeongju had remained relatively small and all glories of the past were gone. In the early 20th century many archaeological excavations took place, mostly on the many tombs which survived the centuries fairly well. A museum, the forerunner of the present-day Gyeongju National Museum, was set up in 1915 to exhibit the finds. The excavations of this period, largely carried out by Japanese archaeologists, are often accused of recklessness and plunder, although others take a more neutral view. (Note: For the negative view, see; for the positive view, see.) Few excavation reports were ever published.

Gyeongju emerged as a railroad junction in the later years of the Japanese Occupation. The Donghae Nambu Line was completed in 1935, cutting directly through the historical areas of central Gyeongju. The Jungang Line was completed in 1942, and Gyeongju became directly connected to Keijō (present-day Seoul). This helped to lay the foundations for future industrial development. Thanks to these improved connections, this period also saw the town beginning to emerge as a center of tourism.

Following liberation in 1945, Korea was plunged into turmoil. Gyeongju was no exception. Returnees from abroad were numerous; a village for them was constructed in present-day Dongcheon-dong. In a period marked by widespread conflict and unrest, the Gyeongju area became particularly notorious for the level of guerrilla activity in the mountains.

The Korean War broke out in 1950. Most of Gyeongju was spared from the fighting, and remained under South Korean control throughout the conflict. However, for a brief time in late 1950 portions of the city stood on the front lines, as North Korean forces pushed the Pusan Perimeter southward from Pohang.

In the 1970s, Korea saw substantial industrial development, much of it centered in the Yeongnam region of which Gyeongju is a part. In 1971, the Gyeongbu Expressway was completed connecting Seoul and Busan, and passing through Gyeongju on the way. The POSCO steel mill in neighboring Pohang commenced operations in 1973, and the chemical manufacturing complex in Ulsan emerged in the same year. These developments helped to support the emergence of the manufacturing sector in Gyeongju.

For almost all of the 20th century, the people of the city had no direct say in their government. The mayors of Gyeongju, like those of all other cities, were directly appointed by the central government, whether the government was that of the Joseon Dynasty, Japanese occupation, or modern South Korea. This changed in 1995, with the establishment of local autonomy throughout the country. The city's first elected mayor was the unaffiliated Lee Won-shik, who served from 1995 to 1998.

In September 2015 the city was hit by an earthquake with a magnitude of 5.8, but no major damage or injuries were reported.

=== Recent discoveries ===
In September 2021, archaeologists announced the discovery of the remains of human sacrifices dating to the Silla Dynasty at Wolseong Palace's western wall in Gyeongju. According to the Gyeongju National Research Institute of Cultural Heritage, a 1,500 year-old female skeleton was found with a necklace, a bracelet and an earthen pot.

== See also ==
- History of Korea
- History of South Korea
