= Cheomseongdae =

Observatory in Gyeongju, South Korea

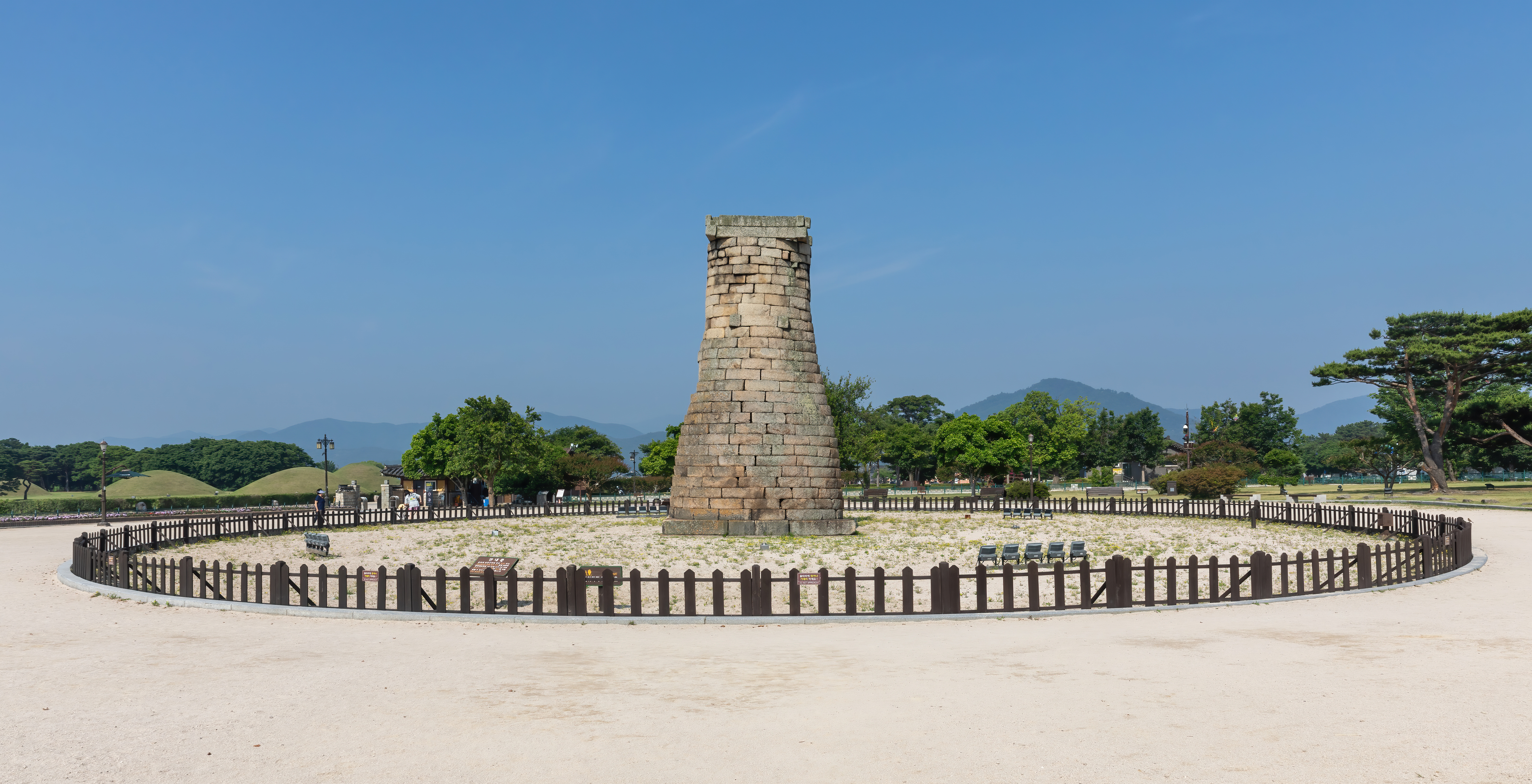
- Cheomseongdae (2009)

General information
- Location: Gyeongju, South Korea
- Coordinates: 35°50′05.0″N 129°13′08.4″E
- Completed: 7th century

Height
- Height: 9.17 m (30.1 ft)

Design and construction
- Designations

UNESCO World Heritage Site
- Official name: Gyeongju Historic Areas
- Criteria: Cultural: (ii), (iii)
- Designated: 2000
- Reference no.: 976

National Treasure (South Korea)
- Official name: Cheomseongdae Observatory, Gyeongju
- Designated: 1962-12-20

Korean name
- Hangul: 첨성대
- Hanja: 瞻星臺
- RR: Cheomseongdae
- MR: Ch'ŏmsŏngdae

Cheomseongdae (Korean: 첨성대; Hanja: 瞻星臺; lit. 'star-gazing tower') is an astronomical observatory in Gyeongju, South Korea. Cheomseongdae is the oldest surviving astronomical observatory in Asia, and possibly even the world. It was constructed during the Silla period, during the reign of Queen Seondeok (r. 632–647 AD). Cheomseongdae was designated as the country's 31st national treasure on December 20, 1962. It is part of Gyeongju Historic Areas, a UNESCO World Heritage Site.

== Structure ==
Cheomseongdae stands 9.17 meters high and consists of three parts: a stylobate, or base upon which a column is constructed, a curved cylindrical body, and a square top. A square opening is located on the south side of the structure, between the 13th and 15th tiers of stones. It is believed to have served as an entrance accessible by an external ladder, while another ladder inside the tower may have provided access to the top for astronomical observations. When viewed from above, Cheomseongdae resembles the Korean Hanja character 井 (정; jeong; 'well').

The square stylobate base is 5.7 meters wide and built from a single layer of 12 rectangular stones. The interior is filled with gravel and soil up to the 12th tier of stones, while the upper section is hollow.

The cylindrical body of the tower is built out of 365 pieces of cut granite, symbolizing the number of days in a year. However, various historical documents have reported different numbers of stones. Song (1983) cites a 1962 survey of the site by Gyeongju National Museum director Hong Sa-jun, who found 366 blocks. This discrepancy in stone count may be attributed to some researchers including or omitting a stone slab inside the top of the tower and not visible from the outside. The stones are fashioned as annular sectors, meaning each stone takes the shape of a curved or bent rectangle.

At the top, there are two tiers of Jeongja-seok (井字石), and it is presumed that an observation device was placed on it. The cylindrical body consists of 27 tiers of stone blocks. At the top, eight elongated rectangular stones are arranged in two tiers to form a square frame resembling the rim of a well.

Its construction style parallels that used at the Bunhwangsa in Gyeongju.

== Symbolism ==
The number and placement of the stones in Cheomseongdae have been theorized to represent various historical and astronomical figures.

The central hole or window separates the body into 12 layers of stones both above and below, symbolizing the 12 months in a year and the 24 solar terms. Additionally, the 12 stones which comprise the stylobate may also reference the 12 months.

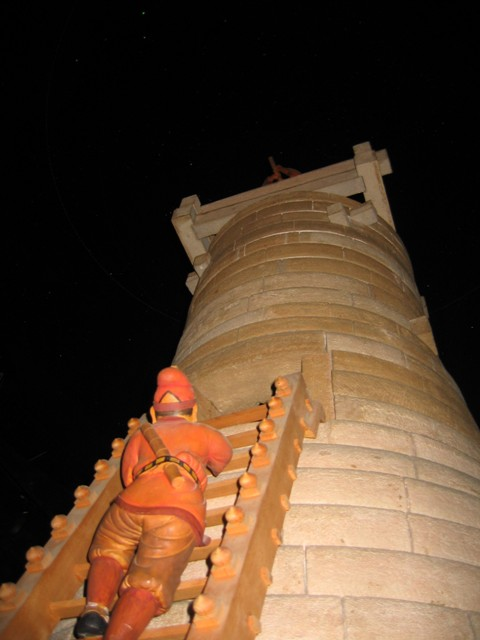
A scaled down model of Cheomseongdae showing its use as an observatory

== Preservation ==
Cheomseongdae's original appearance and shape has remained unchanged for over 1300 years; however the structure now tilts slightly to the north-east. In 2007, a system was installed to measure the state of Cheomseongdae every hour. Of particular concern are cracks and structural displacements, and movements of the foundation stones. Cheomseongdae is additionally susceptible to wear due to aging and weathering, particularly from air pollution and structural imbalance caused by ground subsidence. The exterior of the structure is regularly washed down to remove moss.

The National Research Institute of Cultural Heritage in Korea has conducted inspections on the structure regularly since 1981. Cheomseongdae is owned by the South Korean government and managed by the Gyeongju municipal government.

== Popular culture ==
Cheomseongdae is mentioned in the popular Korean drama Queen Seondeok. In the 2009 drama, Cheomseongdae was constructed when Queen Seondeok was still a princess; this was her first decree as a princess. Cheomseongdae was meant to share the knowledge of astronomy with everyone, rather than letting one person (Lady Misil) abuse the knowledge of it. By doing so, she also abdicated her divine rights. Because this was uncommon at the time and unsupported by many conservatives, at the opening of Cheomseongdae, barely any nobles showed up.
