= Unified Silla =

Korean kingdom (668–935)

Three Unified Han 三韓一統 (Hanja) 삼한일통 (Hangul)
- 668–935
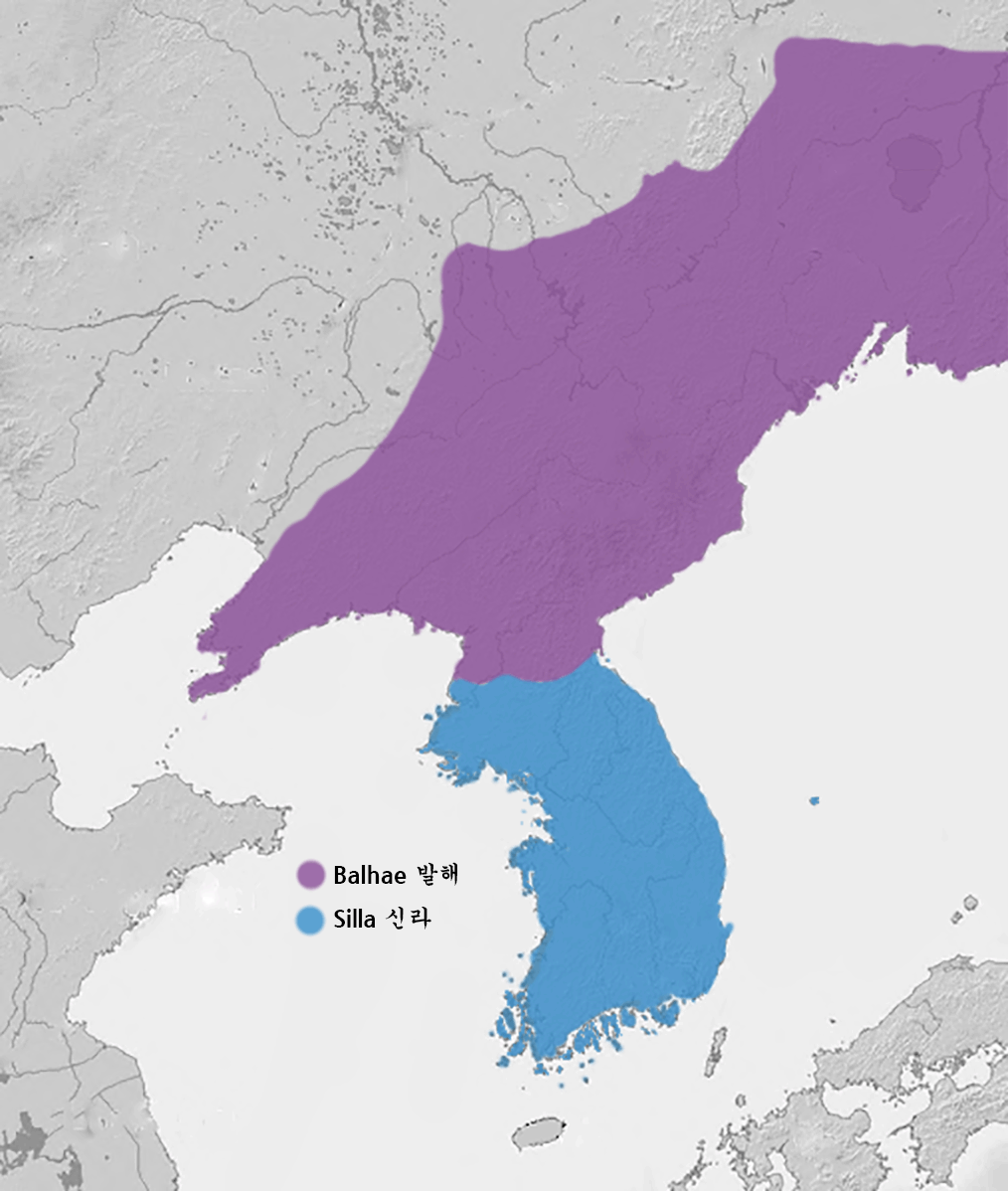
- Silla (in blue) during North–South States Period
- Status: Kingdom
- Capital: Seorabeol (Note: Other name(s): Geumseong (금성; 金城), Saro (사로; 斯盧), Sara (사라; 斯羅), Seonabeol (서나벌; 徐那伐), Seoyabeol (서야벌; 徐耶伐), Seobeol (서벌; 徐伐), Wanggyeong (왕경; 王京)) (Note: With the multiple capitals system; a Supreme capital with one to four secondary capitals (514-c.900))
- Common languages: Old Korean; Classical Chinese, (literary)
- Religion: Buddhism (state religion), Confucianism, Taoism, Shamanism
- Government: Monarchy
- King
  - 661–681: Munmu
  - 681–692: Sinmun
  - 887–897: Jinseong
  - 927–935: Gyeongsun (last)
- Historical era: Post-classical
  - Unified Korea: 668
  - Silla–Tang War: 670–676
  - Start of Later Three Kingdoms period: 892–936
  - Handover to the Goryeo: 935

Population
  - 8th century: 6,000,000
Preceded by
Silla
Goguryeo
Baekje
Succeeded by
Goryeo
Later Baekje
- Today part of: North Korea; South Korea

Korean name
- Hangul: 통일신라
- Hanja: 統一新羅
- RR: Tongil Silla
- MR: T'ongil Silla
- IPA: [tʰoːŋ.iɭ ɕiɭ.ɭa]

Alternate name
- Hangul: 후기신라
- Hanja: 後期新羅
- RR: Hugi Silla
- MR: Hugi Silla

Unified Silla (Korean: 통일신라; Hanja: 統一新羅), Late Silla (후기신라; 後期新羅), or Greater Silla is the name often applied to the historical period of the Korean kingdom of Silla after its conquest of Goguryeo in 668 AD, which marked the end of the Three Kingdoms period. In the 7th century, a Silla–Tang alliance conquered Baekje in the Baekje–Tang War. Following the Goguryeo–Tang War and Silla–Tang War in the 7th century, Silla annexed the southern part of Goguryeo, unifying the central and southern regions of the Korean Peninsula.

Unified Silla existed during the Northern and Southern States period at a time when Balhae controlled the north of the peninsula. Unified Silla lasted for 267 years until it fell to Goryeo in 935 during the reign of King Gyeongsun.

== Terminology ==
The people of the Unified Silla period considered themselves to be of a kingdom of unified Koreans, which they called 三韓一統 (Modern Hangul: 삼한일통, Samhan-iltong), meaning the unity of three kingdoms (the three kingdoms being Silla, Goguryeo, and Baekje). The term was used by general Kim Yu-sin, credited with leading many of the military campaigns to unify the Korean Peninsula under Silla, in a letter he wrote to King Munmu as he lay dying. King Munmu is considered to have been the first ruler of the Unified Silla period, and subsequent kings continued to hold the perception of a unified Silla, as evidenced by King Sinmun's installment of "nine counties" (九州) and "nine legions" (九書堂). In the ancient Sinosphere, the number nine connoted great things, and ancient China was composed of nine counties as well, so the term 九州 was used as a synonym for the entirety of China, as well as for "all under heaven" (天下). In addition, Silla gave noble ranks to the nobles of Goguryeo and Baekje as a token of unification.

North Korean historians criticize the idea of "Unified Silla" as from their perspective, Goryeo was the first state to unify the Korean people as Silla failed to conquer parts of Goguryeo and Balhae in the northeast of the Korean peninsula. Because of this, North Korean historians use the term "Late Silla" (후기신라) where South Korean historians would use "Unified Silla" or "Greater Silla".

== History ==
In 660, King Munmu ordered his armies to attack Baekje. General Kim Yu-sin, aided by Tang forces, defeated General Gyebaek and conquered Baekje. In 661, he moved on Goguryeo but was repelled. Silla then fought against the Tang dynasty for nearly a decade.

During its heyday, the country contested with Balhae, a Goguryeo–Mohe kingdom, to the north for supremacy in the region. Throughout its existence, Unified Silla was plagued by intrigue and political turmoil in its newly conquered northern territory, caused by the rebel groups and factions in Baekje and Goguryeo, which eventually led to the Later Three Kingdoms period in the late 9th century.

Gyeongju remained the capital of Silla throughout the whole existence of the dynasty, which demonstrates the power of the governmental system employed in Silla. By using the "Bone Clan Class" system, a small group of powerful people (the 'bone clan') was able to rule over a large number of subjects. To maintain this rule over a large number of people for an extensive period of time, it was important for the government to keep the unity of the bone-rank system and hold the governed subjects in a low social status.

Despite its political instability, Unified Silla was a prosperous country, and its metropolitan capital of Seorabeol (present-day Gyeongju) was the fourth-largest city in the world at the time. Through close ties maintained with the Tang dynasty, Buddhism and Confucianism became the principal philosophical ideologies of the elite as well as the mainstays of the period's architecture and fine arts. Its last king, Gyeongsun, ruled over the state in name only and submitted to Wang Geon of the emerging Goryeo in 935, bringing the Silla dynasty to an end.

== Culture ==
Unified Silla carried on the maritime prowess of Baekje, which has been likened to the "Phoenicia of medieval East Asia", and during the 8th and 9th centuries dominated the seas of East Asia and the trade between China, Korea and Japan, most notably during the time of Chang Pogo; in addition, Silla people made overseas communities in China on the Shandong Peninsula and the mouth of the Yangtze River.

Unified Silla was a golden age of art and culture, as evidenced by the Hwangnyongsa, Seokguram, and Emille Bell. Buddhism flourished during this time, and many Korean Buddhists gained great fame among Chinese Buddhists and contributed to Chinese Buddhism, including: Woncheuk, Wonhyo, Uisang, Musang, and Kim Gyo-gak, a Silla prince whose influence made Mount Jiuhua one of the Four Sacred Mountains of Chinese Buddhism.

Unified Silla and the Tang maintained close ties. This was evidenced by the continual importation of Chinese culture. Many Korean monks went to China to learn about Buddhism. The monk Hyecho went to India to study Buddhism and wrote an account of his travels. Different new sects of Buddhism were introduced by these traveling monks who had studied abroad such as Seon and Pure Land Buddhism. A small Muslim presence also existed during this time.

Unified Silla conducted a census of all towns' size and population, as well as horses, cows and special products and recorded the data in Minjeongmunseo (민정문서). The reporting was done by the leader of each town.

A national Confucian college was established in 682 and around 750 it was renamed the National Confucian University. The university was restricted to the elite aristocracy. However, in Silla society, because the bone-rank system was used for the election of officials rather than the imperial examination process that was used in Confucianism, the National Confucian University did not have great appeal to the nobility class of Silla.

Silla was very scientifically and technologically advanced for the time. There was an emphasis put on astrology especially as it was closely tied to agriculture. This allowed them to accurately record events such as solar eclipses and lunar eclipses.

=== Woodblock printing ===
Woodblock printing was used to disseminate Buddhist sutras and Confucian works. During a refurbishment of the "Pagoda That Casts No Shadows", an ancient print of a Buddhist sutra was discovered. The print is dated to 751 CE and is one of the oldest discovered printed material in the world.

=== Architecture ===
Architecture during the Unified Silla period reflected both the political unification of the Korean peninsula and the growing influence of Buddhism. Following Silla’s victories over Paekche and Koguryŏ with Tang Chinese support, the capital city of Kyŏngju was reorganized along a rectangular grid modeled after the Tang capital of Chang’an. This urban design reflected broader cultural exchange with China and marked Kyŏngju as the center of artistic and architectural development in Korea. Buddhist architecture flourished during this time, with large temple complexes dominating the landscape and pagodas rising above the city skyline. Many temples were constructed or expanded, often incorporating carefully planned courtyards, gates, lecture halls, and covered walkways arranged along central axes.

One of the most important surviving examples is Pulguk Temple, built in the mid eighth century. Its layout demonstrates the structured design of Unified Silla temples, with stone staircases leading to courtyards that contain symmetrically placed pagodas. The simpler three story Sŏkkat’ap pagoda represents the historical Buddha, while the more elaborate Tabot’ap pagoda symbolizes the Buddha of the past, illustrating Buddhist teachings through architectural form. Another remarkable achievement is the nearby Sŏkkuram grotto, a carefully engineered granite cave shrine housing a monumental seated Buddha surrounded by relief sculptures. Together these monuments highlight the technical skill, symbolic planning, and spiritual significance that defined Unified Silla architecture.

== See also ==
- History of Korea
