= Seochulji Pond =

Pond in Gyeongju, South Korea

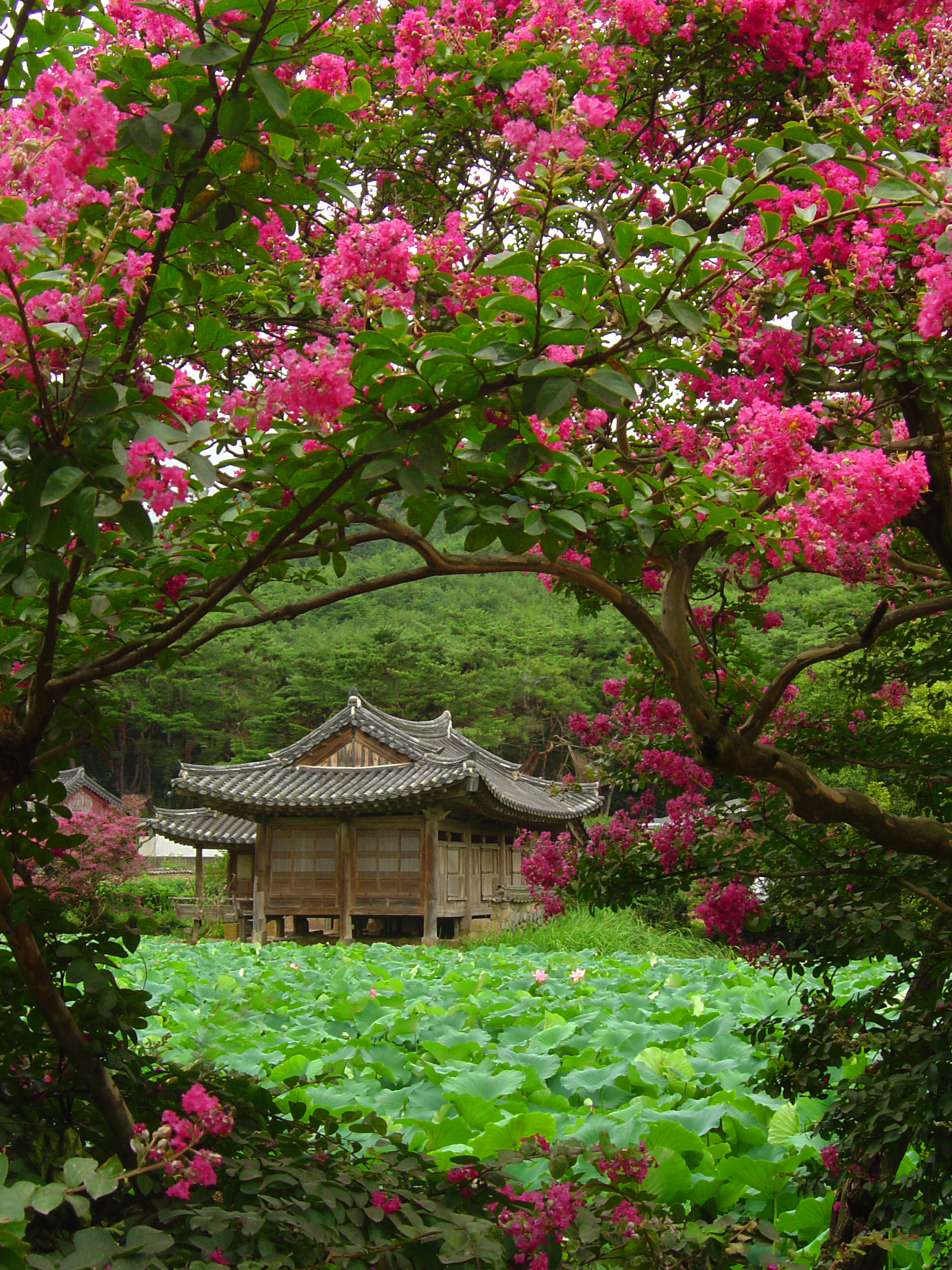
- Part of the pond (2005)
- Coordinates: 35°47′47″N 129°14′31″E
- Designation

UNESCO World Heritage Site
- Criteria: Cultural: (ii), (iii)
- Designated: 2000
- Part of: Gyeongju Historic Areas
- Reference no.: 976

Historic Sites of South Korea
- Designated: 1964-07-11
- Reference no.: 138

Location
- Interactive map of Seochulji Pond

Seochulji (Korean: 서출지; Hanja: 書出池) is a pond in Namsan-dong, Gyeongju, South Korea. On July 11, 1964, it was designated Historic Site of South Korea No. 138.

It is a natural pond and has been long famed for its beauty. The pond is associated with a legend recorded in the Samguk yusa. Per the legend, King Soji (r. 749–500) received a warning from an old man who emerged from the pond. The pond's name comes from this legend; it means "letter from the pond". A building used for leisure that dates to 1664 still remains at the northwest side of the pond.

== Gallery ==
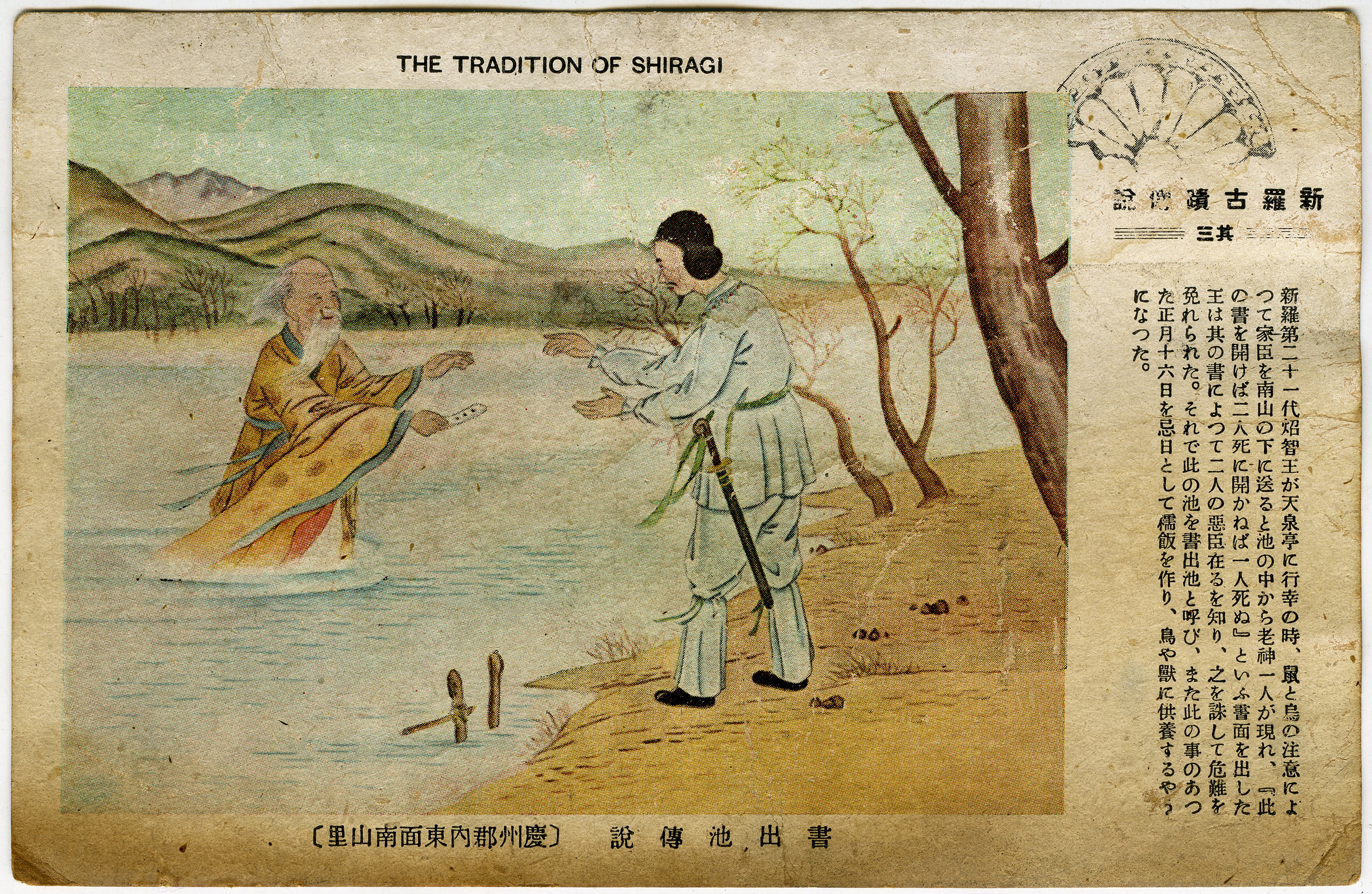
A Japanese colonial era illustration of the legend of Seochulji (1930s)

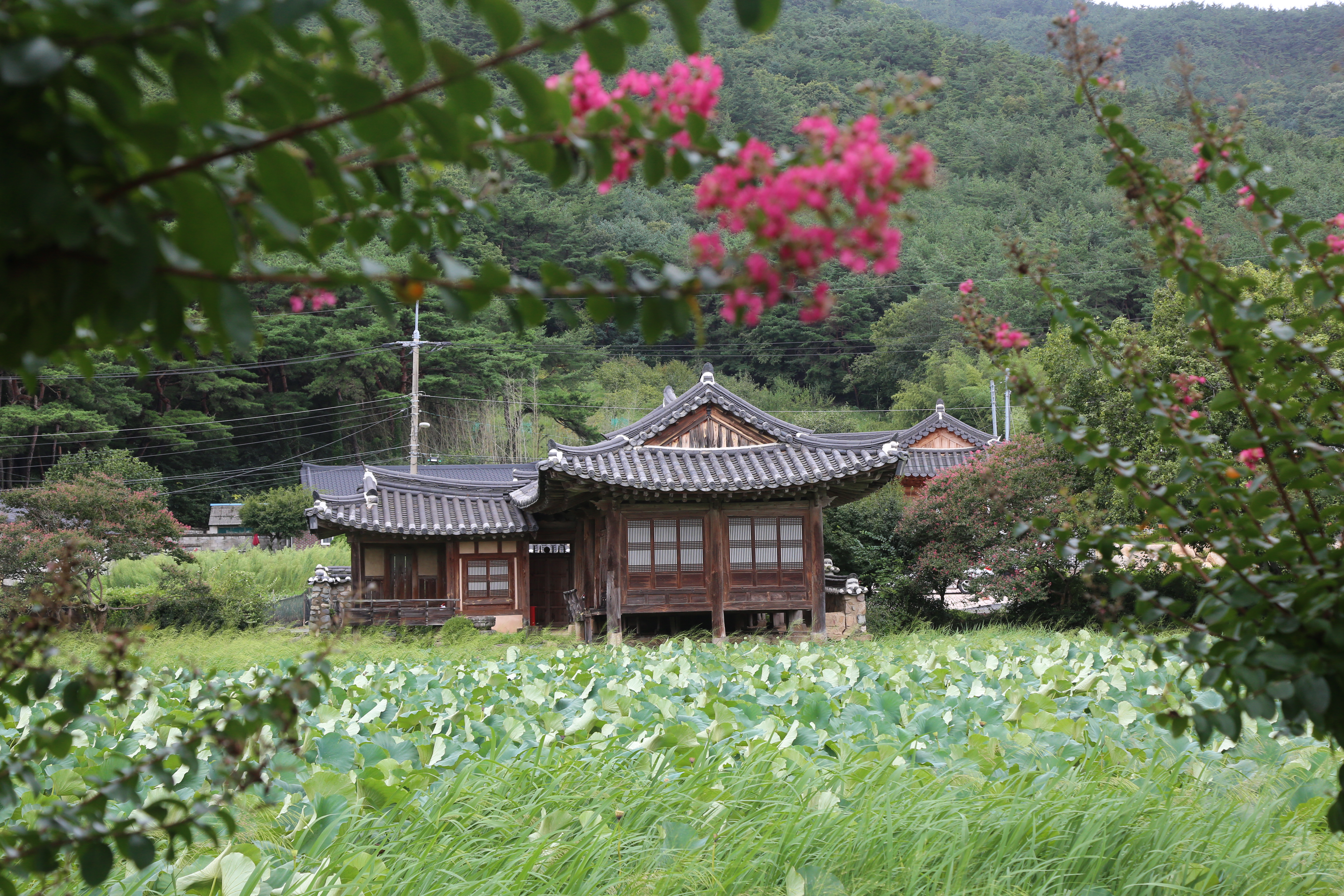
Alternate view of the pond (2019)
