= Myeonghwalseong =

Former fortress in Gyeongju, South Korea

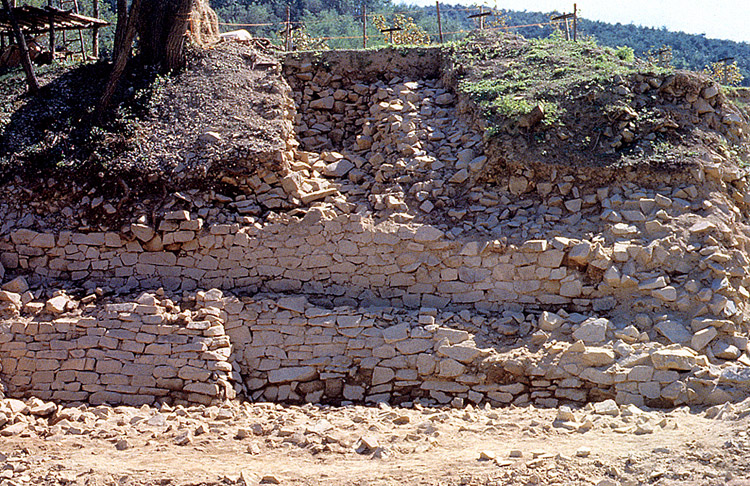
- Part of the ruins (2003)
- Interactive map of the Myeonghwalseong area
- Alternative names: Myeonghwalsanseong, Myeonghwal Mountain Fortress

General information
- Location: Gyeongju, South Korea
- Coordinates: 35°50′08″N 129°15′19″E
- Completed: Before 405 (Korean calendar)
- Closed: 7th century

Design and construction
- Designations

UNESCO World Heritage Site
- Official name: Myeonghwal Mountain Fortress
- Criteria: Cultural: (ii), (iii)
- Part of: Gyeongju Historic Areas
- Reference no.: 976

Historic Sites of South Korea
- Designated: 1963-01-21
- Reference no.: 47

Myeonghwalseong (Korean: 명활성; Hanja: 明活城) or Myeonghwalsanseong (명활산성; 明活山城) was a Silla-era Korean fortress on the mountain Myeonghwalsan in what is now Gyeongju, South Korea. On January 21, 1963, it was made Historic Site of South Korea No. 47. It is part of the UNESCO World Heritage Site entitled Gyeongju Historic Areas, as part of the Sanseong Fortress Belt.

It is not known with certainty when the fortress was first constructed. There is a record in the Samguk sagi of the fortress being attacked in 405 AD (Korean calendar). It was attacked by Japanese invaders in 431. It was repaired in 473, and King Jabi moved into it in 475. There are records of it being rebuilt in 551, 554, and 593. It was likely abandoned after 647, after it was captured by Bidam's rebels. There are no known signs of activity at this site that date to after the 7th century.

Currently, the fortress is mostly in ruins. Archaeological digs have identified six sites where buildings likely once stood. A survey on the site was performed in 1998. From 2012 to 2014, another survey was conducted, which found further evidence that the fortress was reconstructed a number of times.
