= Gyeongju Historic Areas =

World Heritage Site in South Korea

UNESCO World Heritage Site
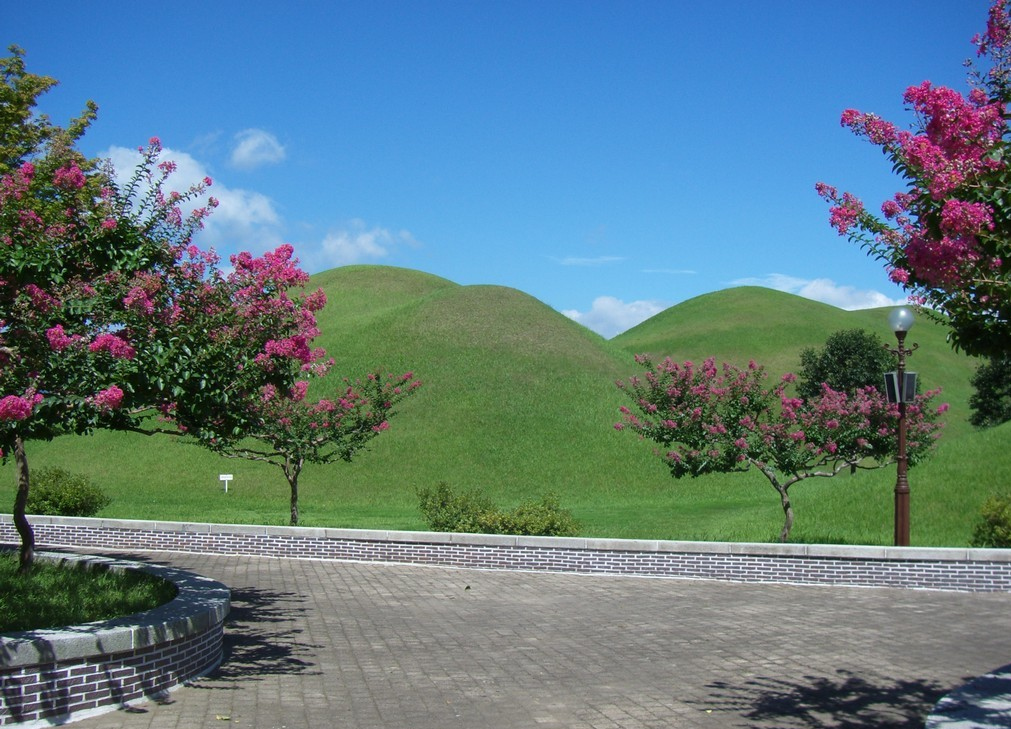
- Royal tumuli at Gyeongju
- Interactive map of Gyeongju Historic Areas
- Location: Gyeongju, North Gyeongsang Province, South Korea
- Criteria: Cultural: (ii), (iii)
- Reference: 976
- Inscription: 2000 (24th Session)
- Area: 2,880 ha (7,100 acres)
- Buffer zone: 350 ha (860 acres)
- Coordinates: 35°47′20″N 129°13′36″E

Korean name
- Hangul: 경주 역사유적 지구
- Hanja: 慶州 歷史遺蹟 地區
- RR: Gyeongju yeoksayujeok jigu
- MR: Kyŏngju yŏksayujŏk chigu

Gyeongju Historic Areas (Korean: 경주 역사유적 지구) is a World Heritage Site in Gyeongju, South Korea that was designated by UNESCO in 2000. The protected areas encompass the ruins of temples and palaces, outdoor pagodas and statuary, and other cultural artifacts left by the Koreanic kingdom Silla (57 BC – 935 AD).

== Description ==
The item is organized into five subregions that each contain a number of attractions.

=== Mount Namsan Belt ===
The Mount Namsan Belt is based around the holy mountain Namsan, in the north of Gyeongju. The mountain itself is considered a large open-air museum because of the ancient art and artifacts on display in the open. The area includes numerous Buddhist art and artifacts, as well as the ruins of 122 temples, 53 stone statues, 64 stone pagodas, and 16 stone lanterns. Other notable sites include the Namsan Mountain Fortress (built in 591 CE), the Poseokjeong Pavilion site (famous for its abalone-shaped watercourse), and the Seochulji Pond.

=== Wolseong Belt ===
The Wolseong Belt is based around the site of the former palace Wolseong. It also contains the Gyerim woodland, the artificial pond Anapji, and the observatory Cheomseongdae. The observatory is the oldest of its kind in East Asia.

=== Tumuli Park Belt ===
This area consists of three groups of royal tombs. Most of the tumuli are shaped like domes or mounds of earth. However, some are shaped like gourds or half-moons. Excavated tombs reveal wooden coffins covered with gravel and rich grave goods of gold, glass, and quality ceramics. A famous example of a tomb in this park is the Heavenly Horse Tomb which contained a mural painting on birch bark saddle flap of a winged horse.

=== Hwangnyongsa Belt ===
The Hwangnyongsa Belt is centered around the ruins of the temple Hwangnyongsa. According to the excavated foundation stones, Hwangnyongsa was the largest temple ever built in Korea and covered 72,500 m^{2}. The area also includes the temple Bunhwangsa.

=== Sanseong Belt ===
The Sanseong Belt includes the ruins of fortresses along the east coast of South Korea. It notably includes Myeonghwalseong.

== See also ==
- Gyeongju National Park
- Tourism in Gyeongju
