= Namsansinseong =

Former fortress in Gyeongju, South Korea

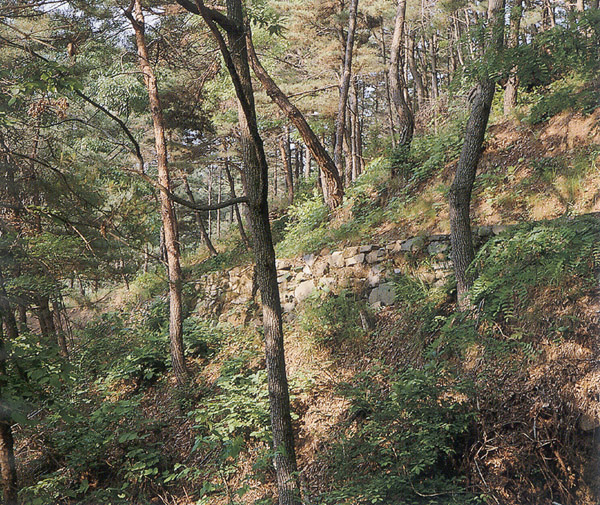
- Part of the remaining wall (2015)
- Interactive map of Namsansinseong
- Location: Namsan, Gyeongju, South Korea
- Coordinates: 35.8169°N 129.2286°E
- Built: 591 (Korean calendar)

UNESCO World Heritage Site
- Official name: Namsan Mountain Fortress
- Criteria: Cultural: (ii), (iii)
- Designated: 2000
- Part of: Gyeongju Historic Areas
- Reference no.: 976

Historic Sites of South Korea
- Official name: Namsansinseong Fortress, Gyeongju
- Designated: 1963-01-21

Namsansinseong (Korean: 남산신성; Hanja: 南山新城) was a Silla-era Korean fortress located on the mountain Namsan in what is now Gyeongju, South Korea. On January 21, 1963, its location was made Historic Site of South Korea No. 22.

According to the Samguk sagi, it was built in 591 (Korean calendar), during the reign of King Jinpyeong. It was significantly renovated in 679, during the reign of King Munmu.

Its history is documented in 9 steles that have been discovered between 1935 and 1994. Currently much of the fortress is in ruins; parts of the wall remain.
