= Hwangnyongsa =

Former temple in Gyeongju, South Korea

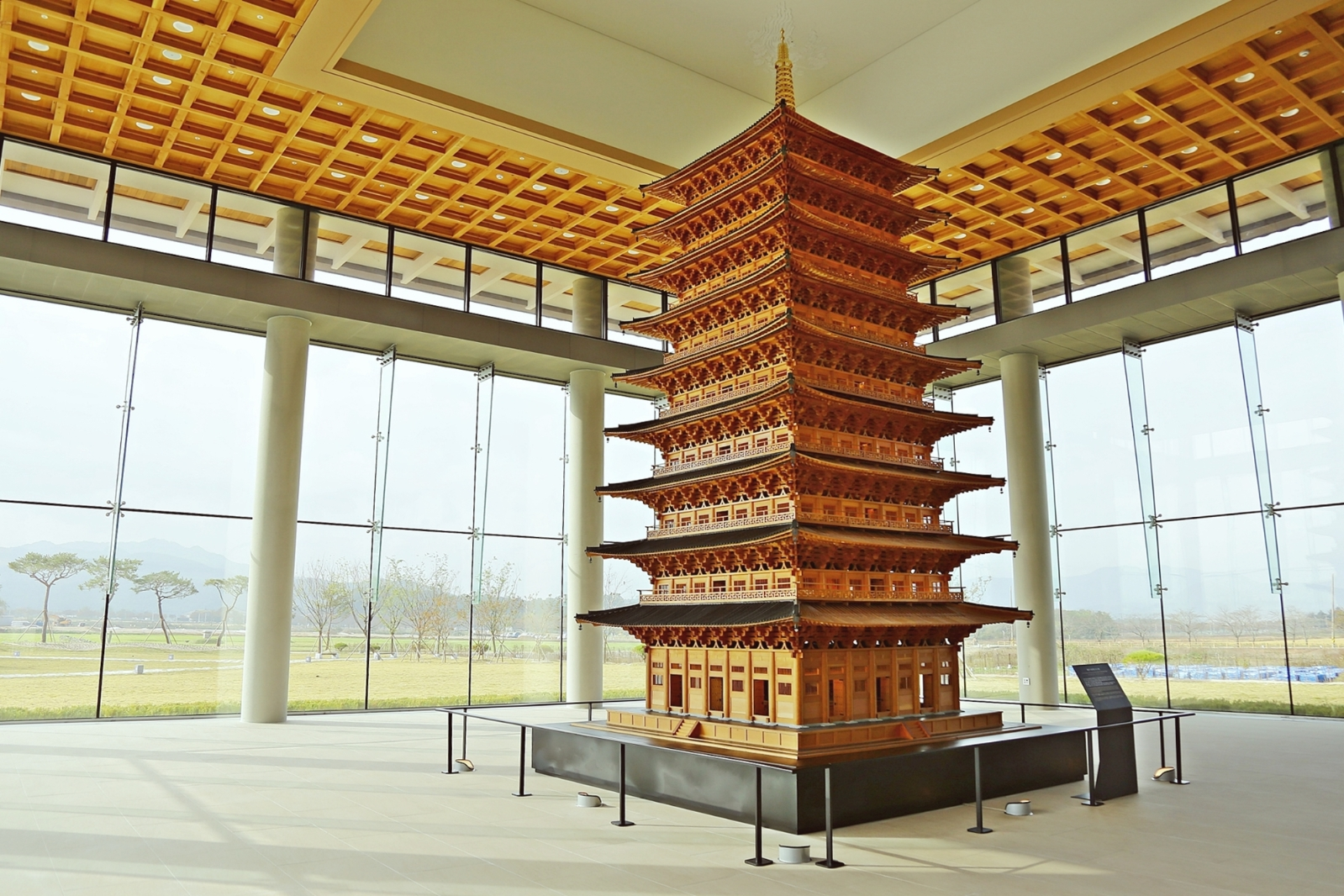
- A miniature reconstruction of what the main pagoda may have once looked like. (1/10 scale)

Religion
- Affiliation: Korean Buddhism

Location
- Interactive map of Hwangnyongsa
- Coordinates: 35°47′20″N 129°13′36″E

Architecture
- Completed: 7th century
- Destroyed: 1238
- Height (max): 80 m (260 ft) (pagoda)
- UNESCO World Heritage Site
- Designated: 2000
- Parent listing: Gyeongju Historic Areas
- Reference no.: 976
- Historic Sites of South Korea
- Official name: Hwangnyongsa Temple Site, Gyeongju
- Designated: 1963-01-21
- Reference no.: 6

Korean name
- Hangul: 황룡사
- Hanja: 皇龍寺
- RR: Hwangnyongsa
- MR: Hwangnyongsa

Hwangnyongsa (Korean: 황룡사), alternatively Hwangnyong Temple or Hwangryongsa, was a Buddhist temple in the city of Gyeongju, South Korea.

Completed in the 7th century, the enormous 9-story structure was built entirely out of wood with interlocking design and no iron nails. It had a standing total height of 68 m (223 ft) or 80 m (262 ft), making it one of the tallest structures in East Asia at the time of its construction. Only the massive foundation stones of the temple remain in current times.

Hwangnyongsa was the center of state-sponsored Buddhism during the Silla and Unified Silla eras which were cultural beacons of Buddhism during its time. Its name means "Emperor/Imperial Dragon Temple." Archaeological excavations and other scientific studies of the temple began in April 1976 (OCPRI 1984) and continue today.

A replica of the building called Hwangnyongwon (황룡원) now exists in Gyeongju, within the Bomun Tourism Complex. The building is used to host events, including conferences, banquets, and meetings. It also operates as a hotel, with 45 guest rooms available.

== History ==
Hwangnyongsa was built during the Silla period, under the patronage of the Silla royal family, on a plain encircled by mountains near the royal palace compound of Banwolseong (Half-Moon Palace). Construction began in 553 under the reign of King Jinheung, and was not fully completed until 644. King Jinheung originally intended for the temple to be the site of a new palace but when a dragon was seen on the proposed site, a temple was commissioned instead. Hwangnyongsa was designed to be a place where monks prayed for the welfare of the nation by asking for the divine protection of the Buddha and a means to impress foreign dignitaries.

Following the defeat of Baekje in the 660s, the Baekje architect, Abiji, was commissioned to build a nine-story wooden pagoda at the site, and labored with two hundred artisans to complete the pagoda. This fact indicates that the Baekje had superior knowledge of wooden architecture. The nine stories supposedly represented the nine nations of East Asia and Silla's future conquest of those states. The pagoda stood until it was burned by Mongolian invasions in 1238. No wooden architecture from the Silla people survives today but the ruins of Hwangnyongsa suggest a Goguryeo influence.

The temple site in a valley within Gyeongju National Park near Toham Mountain and about 150 yards (140 m) from Bunhwangsa Temple, was excavated in 1972, revealing the temple layout and covering 40,000 artifacts.

== Legends ==
Buddhism was strongly resisted by the nobles of Silla while the king personally supported the new religion. The king's Grand Secretary, Ichadon, suggested that he forge the king's royal seal and create an order that the people adopt the new religion. When the forgery was discovered by the nobles, Ichadon suggested that he be made the scapegoat, and that through his death the power of Buddha be made manifest. The king agreed to the plan. The nobles were predictably outraged when they discovered Ichadon's forgery and the king ordered his execution. Legend has it that when Ichadon was executed, a series of miracles occurred which proved the power and reality of the Buddhist faith, and the nobles converted to the new state religion. Ichadon's sacrifice was the impetus for the building of Hwangnyongsa Temple.

Another legend concerns the giant golden Buddha statue that the temple possessed. It was cast in the reign of King Jinheung as the temple centerpiece. The legend states that the gold for the statue came from King Ashoka of India. Ashoka had apparently attempted to cast a golden triad but failed. He then put the gold in a boat along with scale models of Bodhisattvas. Each country that received the boat was equally unable to cast the statues, and not until the boat had arrived in Silla could a statue be cast.

== Dimensions ==
Only the massive foundation stones of the temple remain in current times. The original complex took seventeen years to complete.

- The main hall was 155 feet (47 m) in length and 55 feet (17 m) in width.
- The longest outer wall of the temple was 288 meters in length and the area enclosed by the outer walls covered approximately 80,000 square meters.
- The temple ruins also contain pedestal stones which were for monumental Buddhist statues. One statue of the Sakyamuni Buddha was five meters tall.
- The temple was originally arranged in the "three Halls-one Pagoda" style which meant that the pagoda was in the center of the complex and flanked by three main halls on the left, right, and behind the central pagoda.
- The famous nine-story pagoda, which was commissioned by Queen Seondeok after the main temple was finished, was the largest Korean pagoda ever built as well as being the tallest structure in East Asia and the tallest wooden structure in the world at the time of its completion. It was reported to be 263 feet (80 m) tall and the body was made entirely of wood. Only its foundation stones remain today but they attest to the mammoth proportions of the original structure. The pagoda had a foundation area of 6,084 square feet (565.2 m^{2}), was supported by eight pillars on each side, and had sixty foundation stones.

== Gallery ==
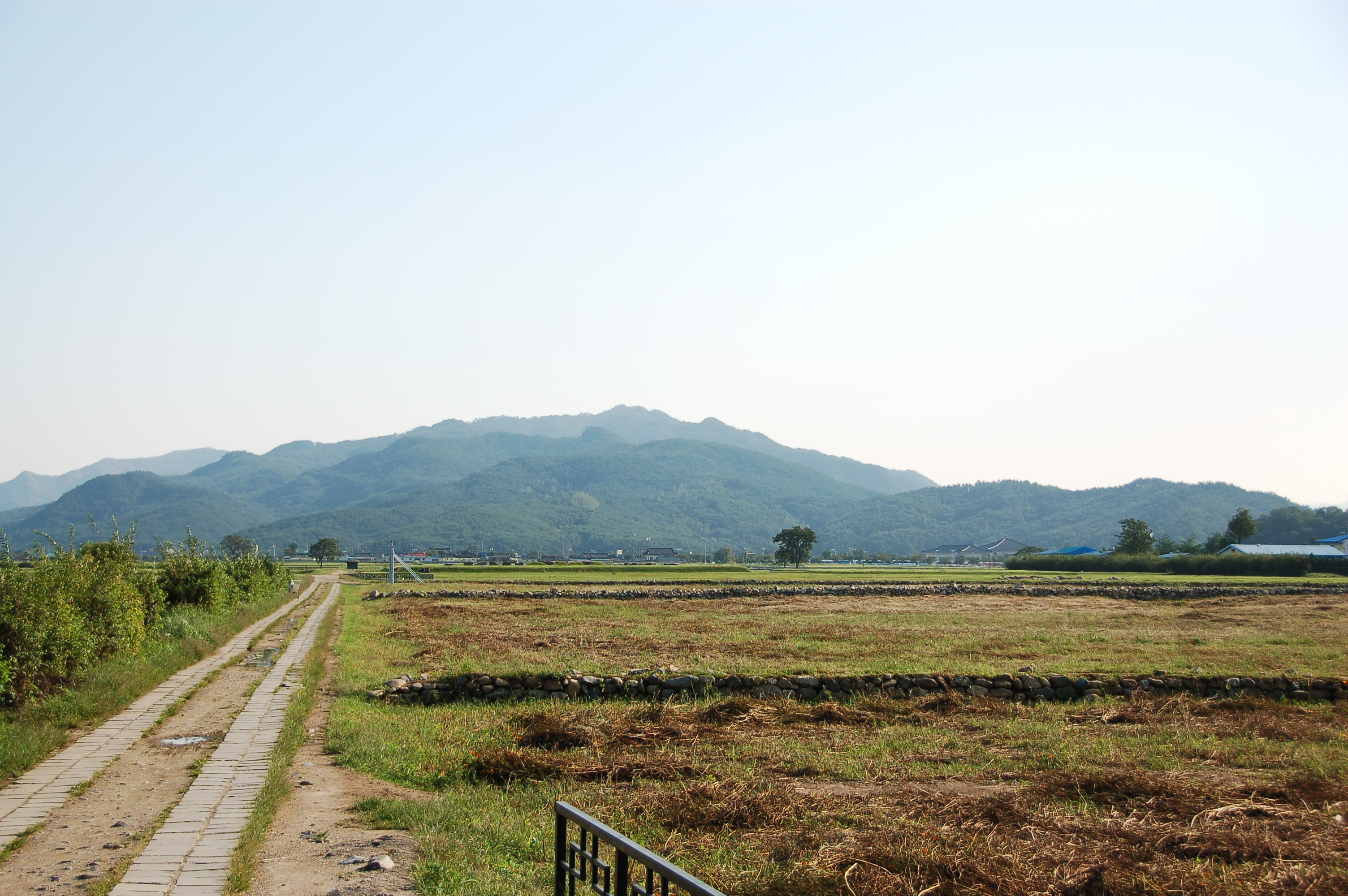
A part of Hwangnyonsa remains.

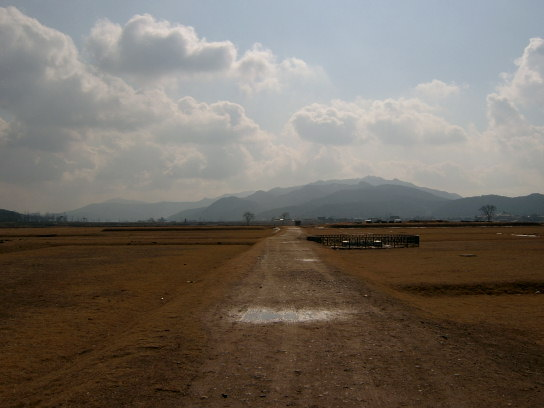
From a spot which once had been the main entrance to the temple.

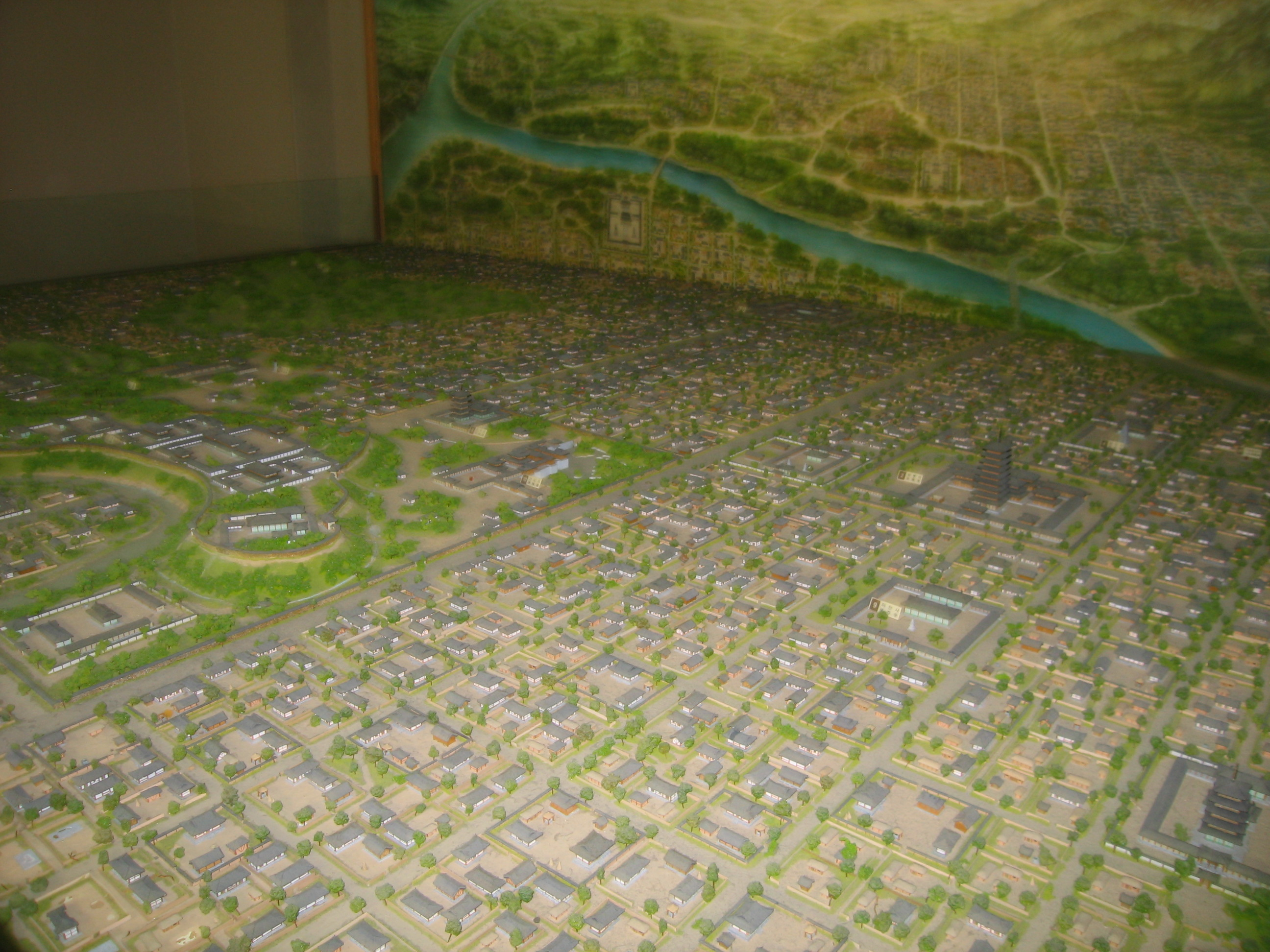
A model of old Gyeongju. The pagoda at Hwangnyongsa Temple towers over the city.

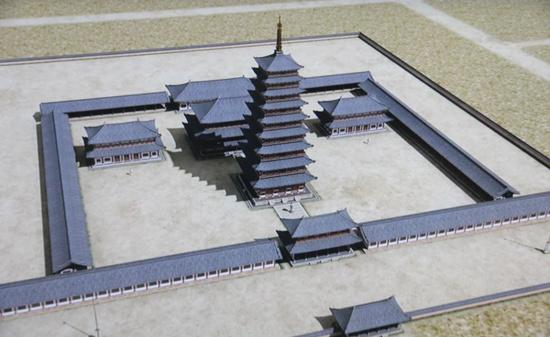
Picture of the Panorama of the Hwangnyongsa.

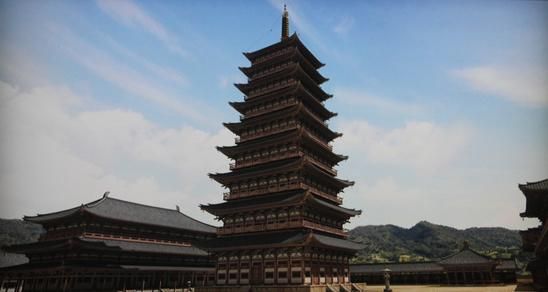
Picture of the Nine story pagoda of the Hwangnyongsa.

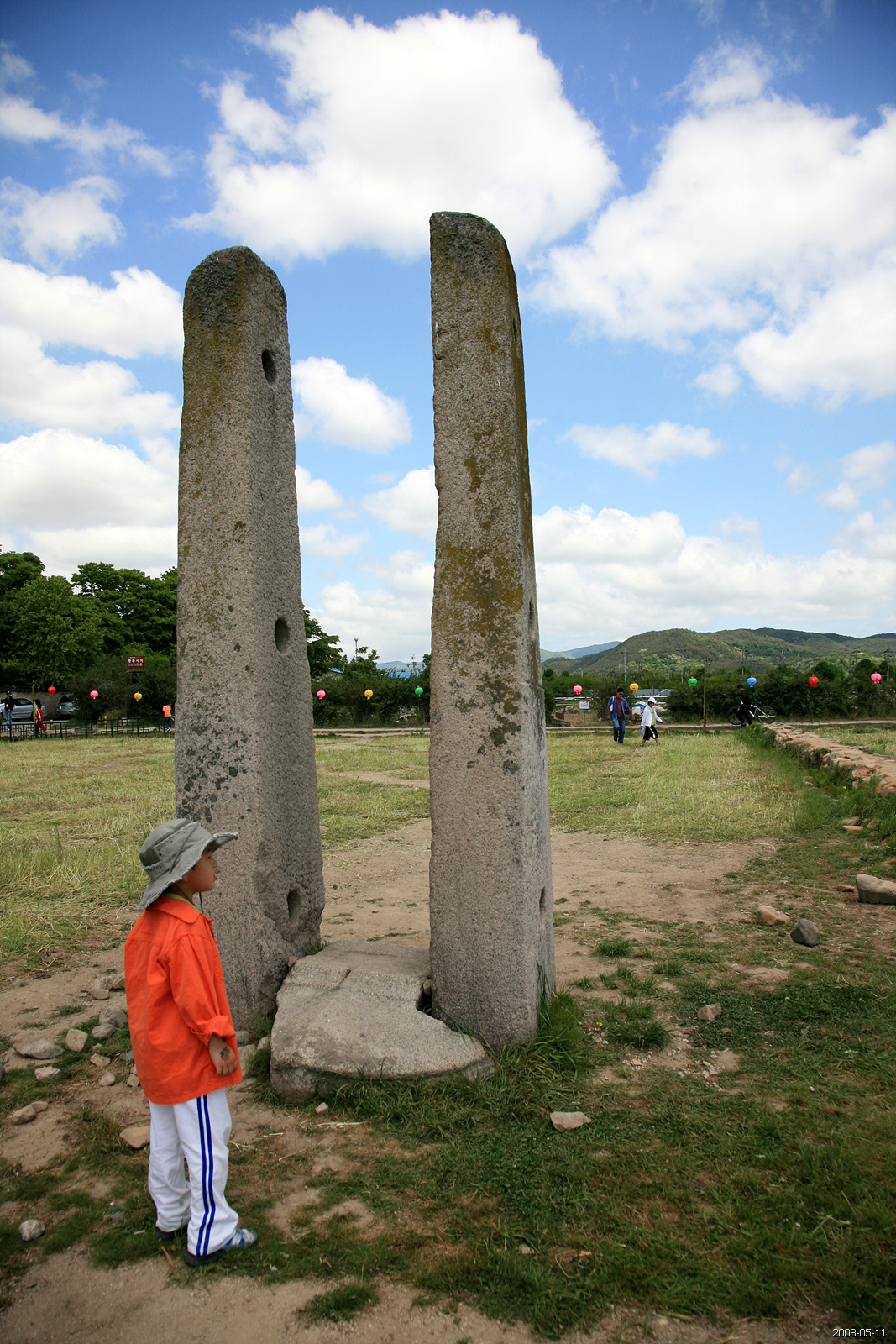
Stones to support a flag pole

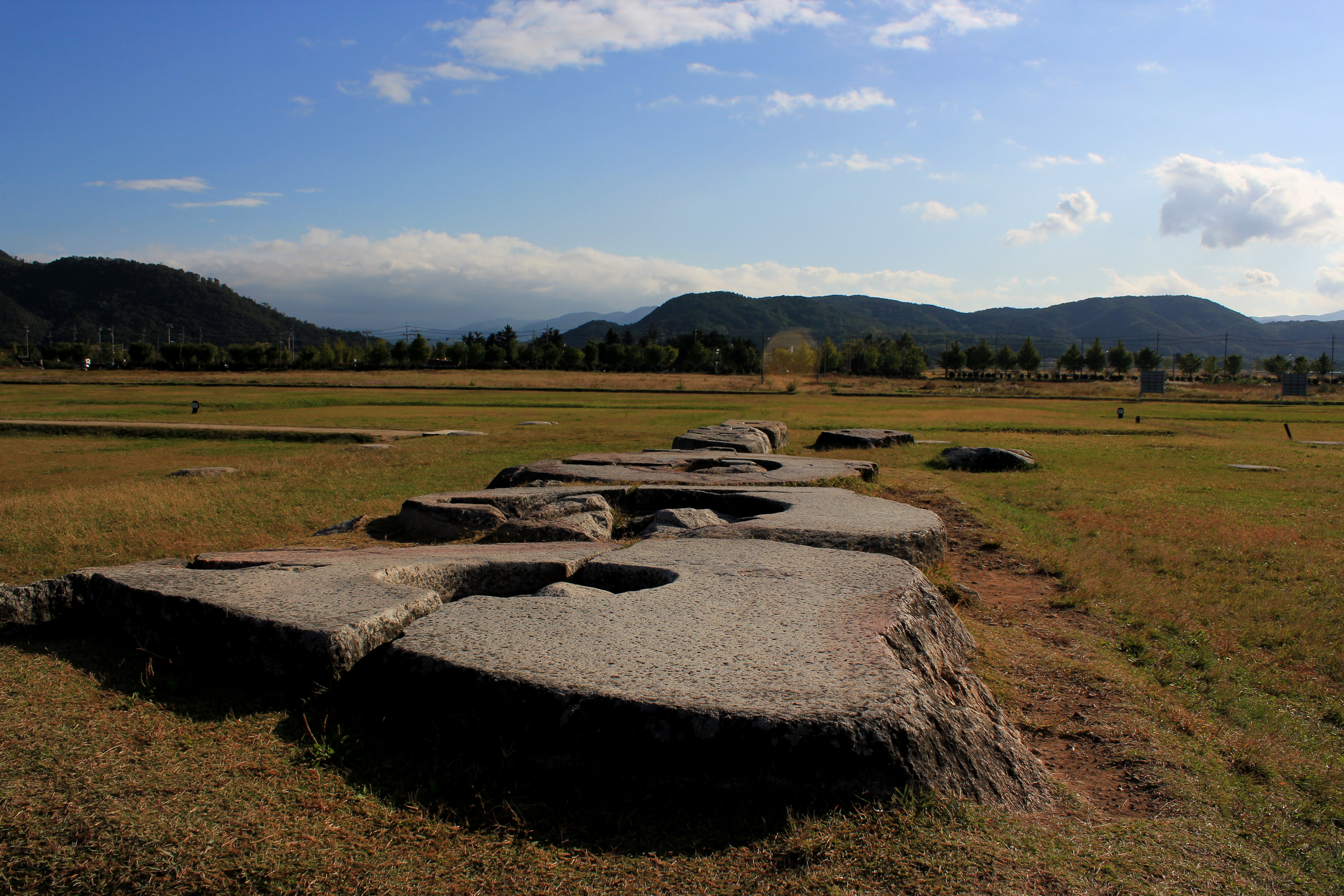

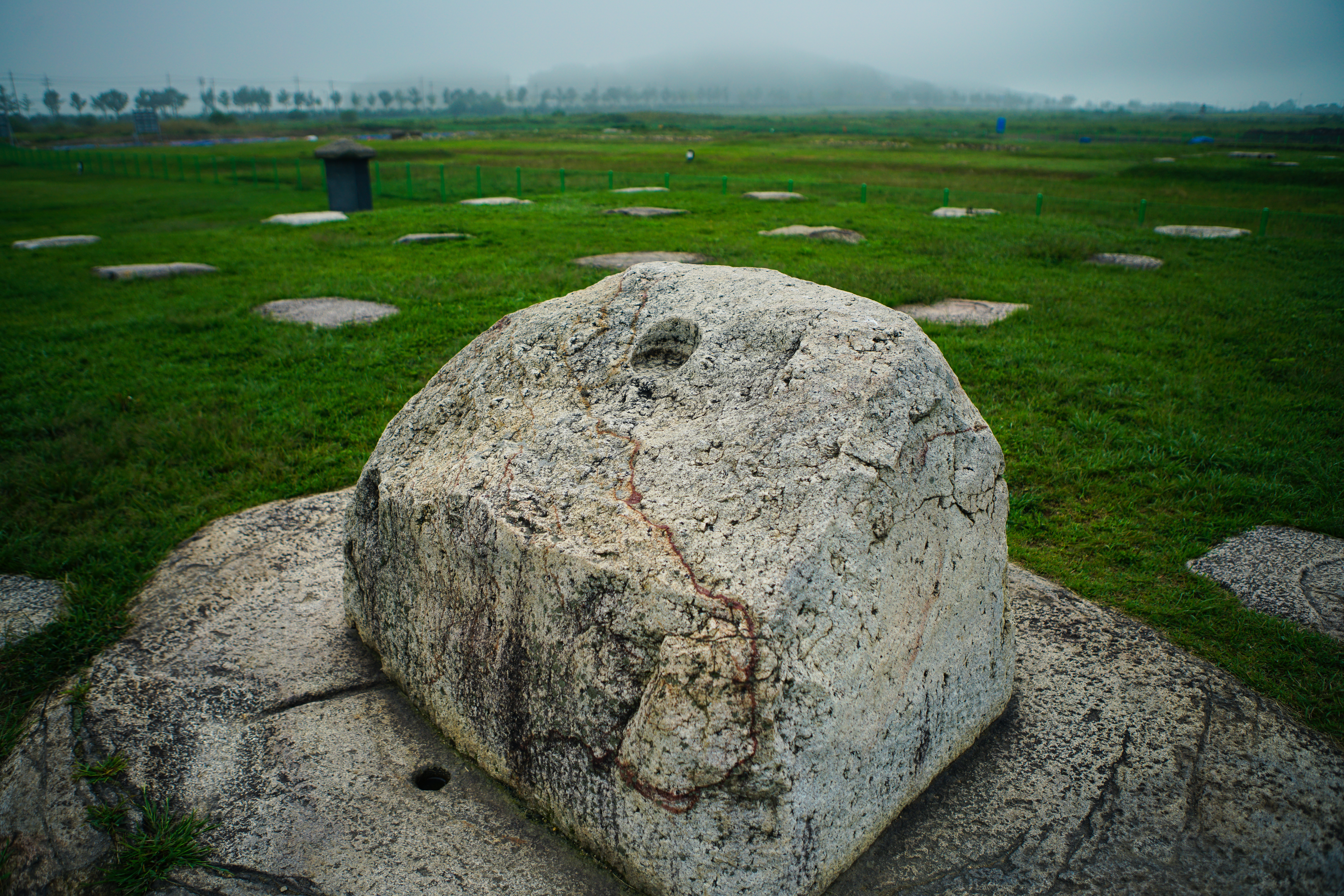

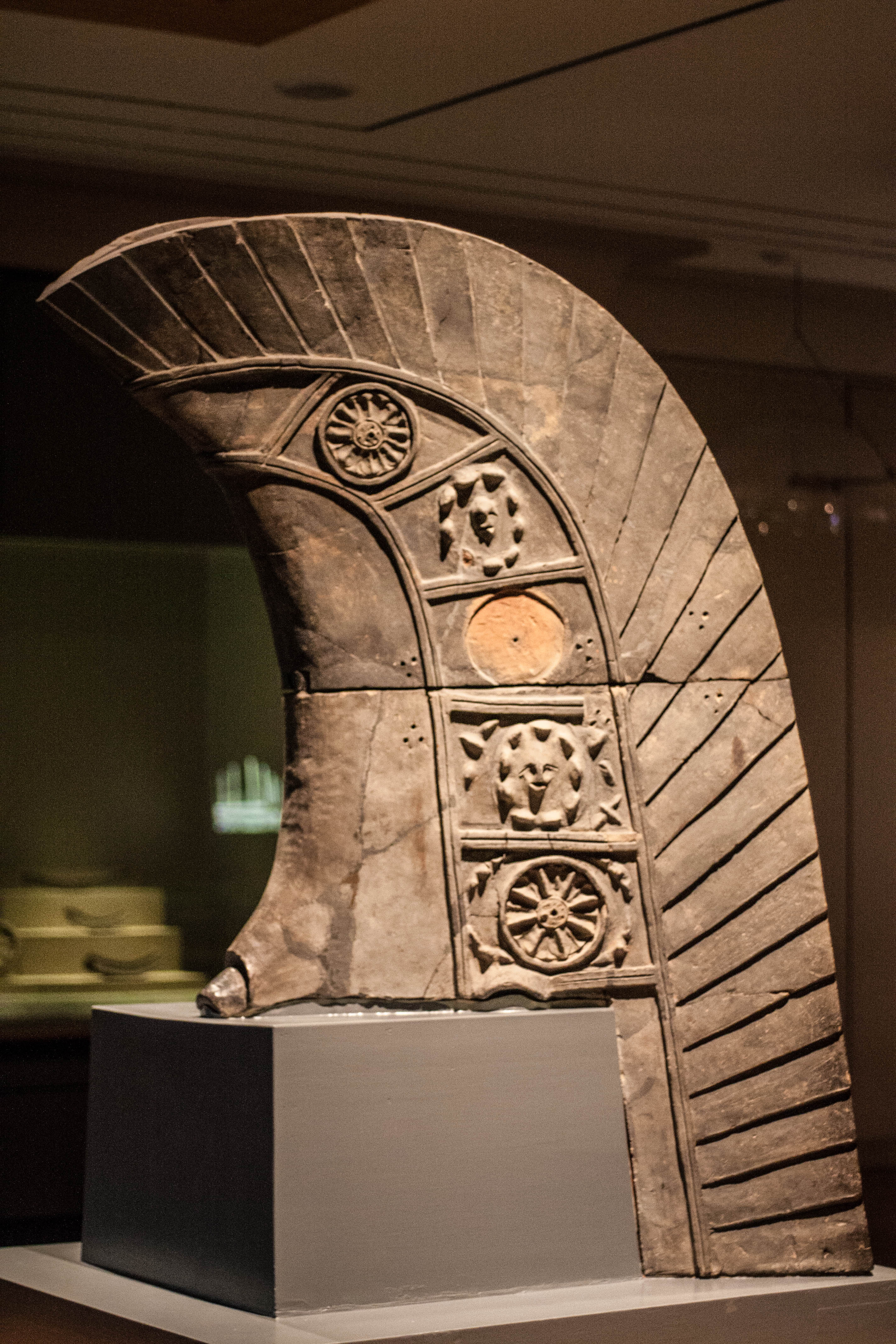

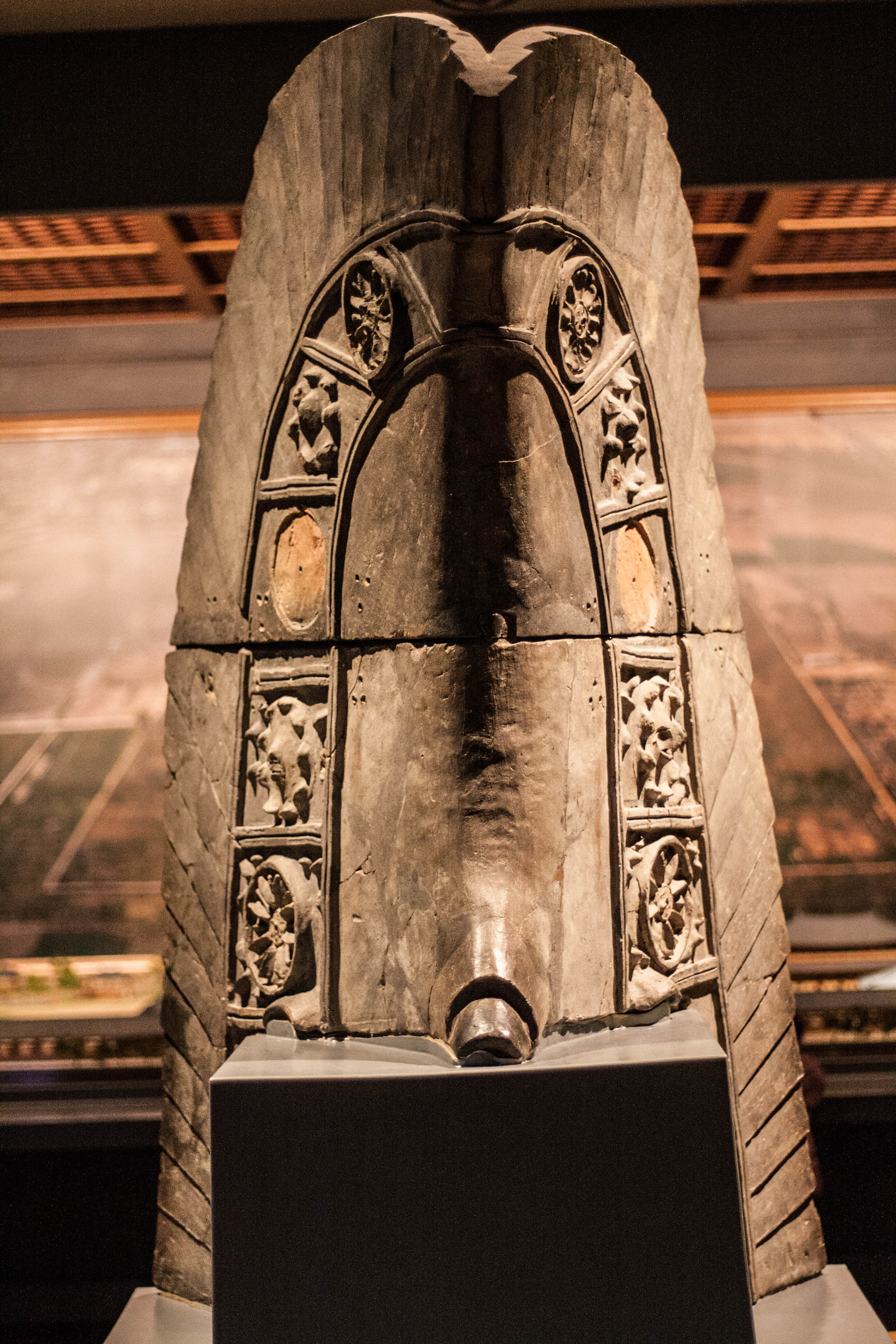

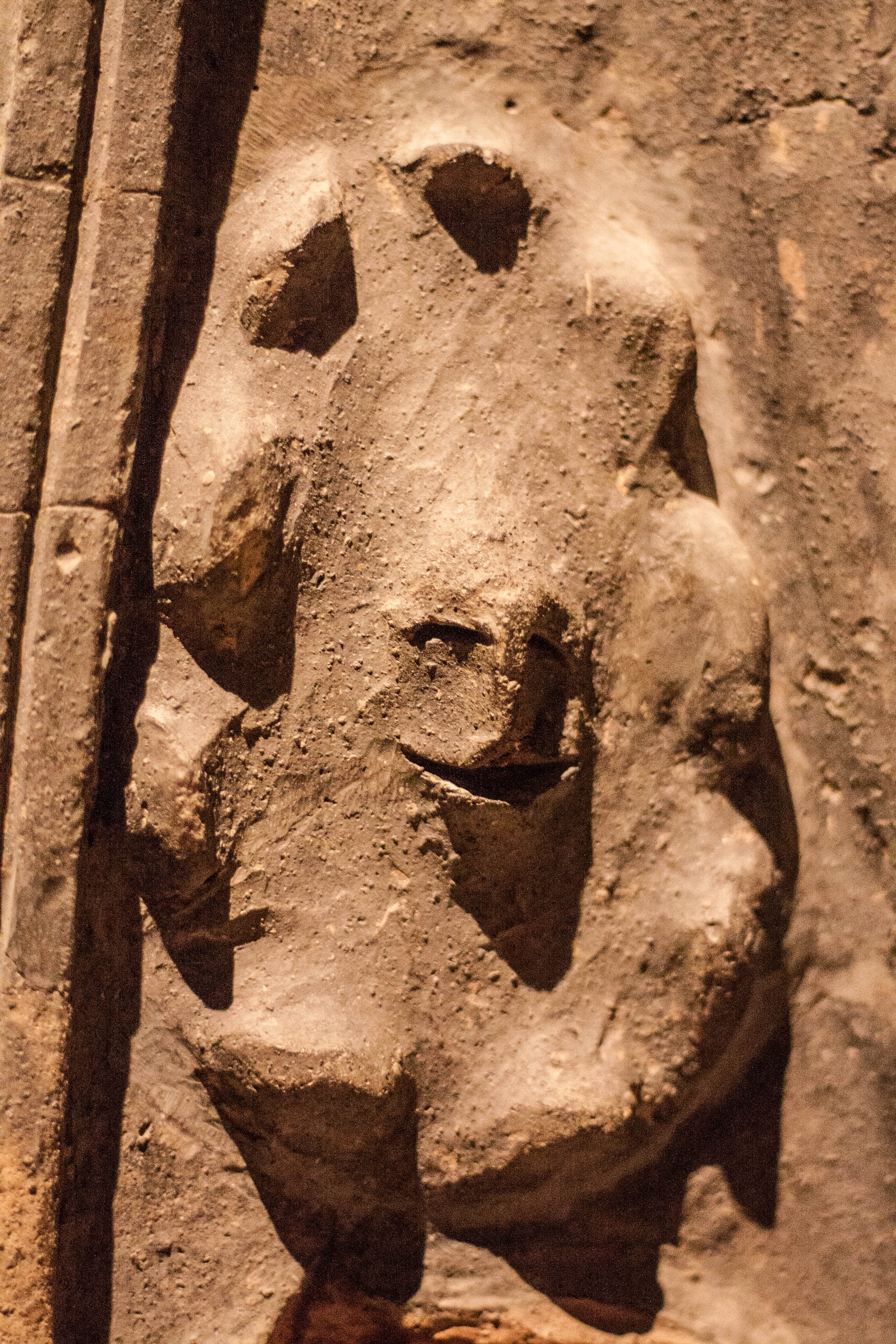

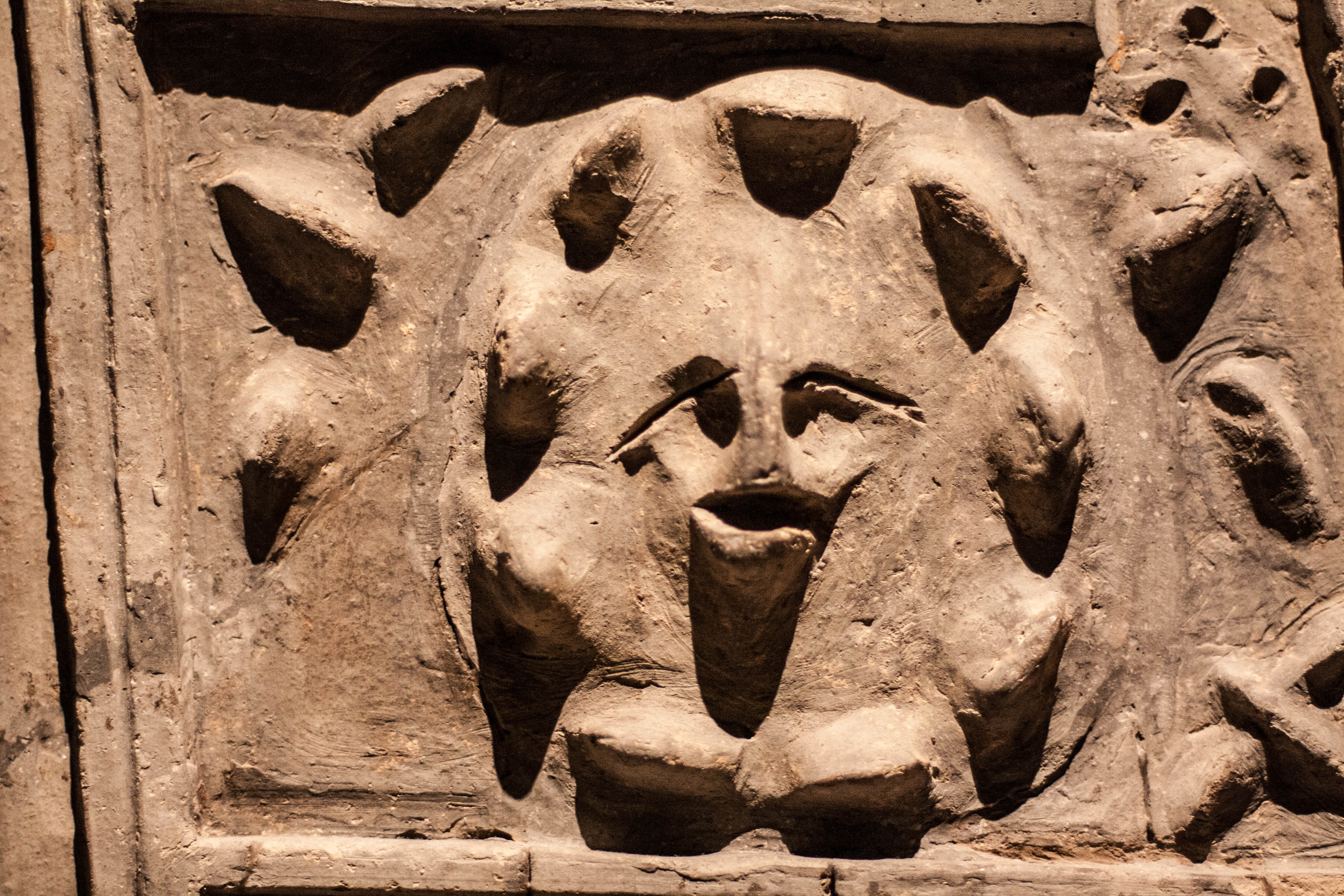

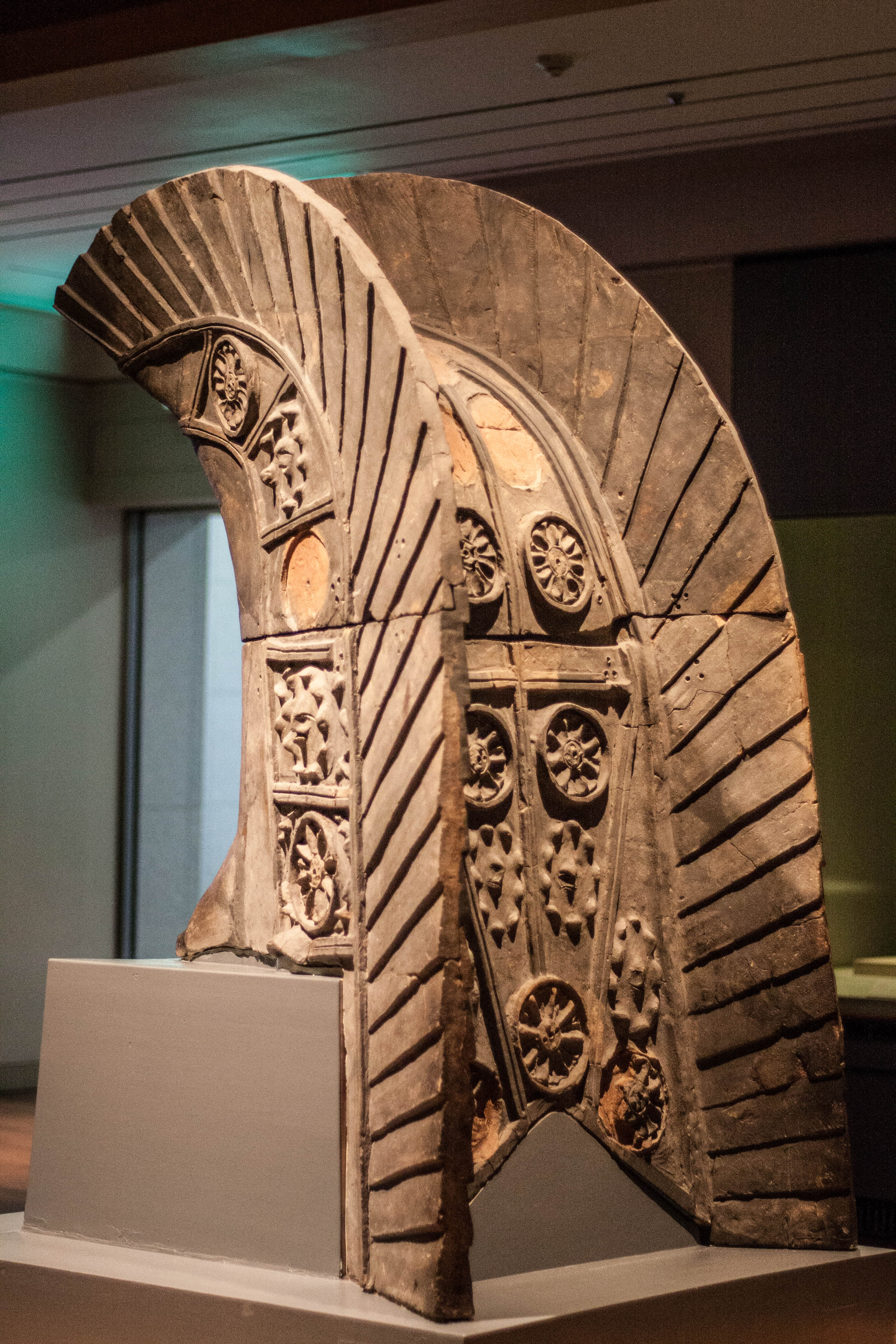

== See also ==
- Korean Buddhism
- Korean Buddhist temples
- History of Korea
- List of tallest structures built before the 20th century
