= Bunhwangsa =

Buddhist temple in Gyeongju, South Korea

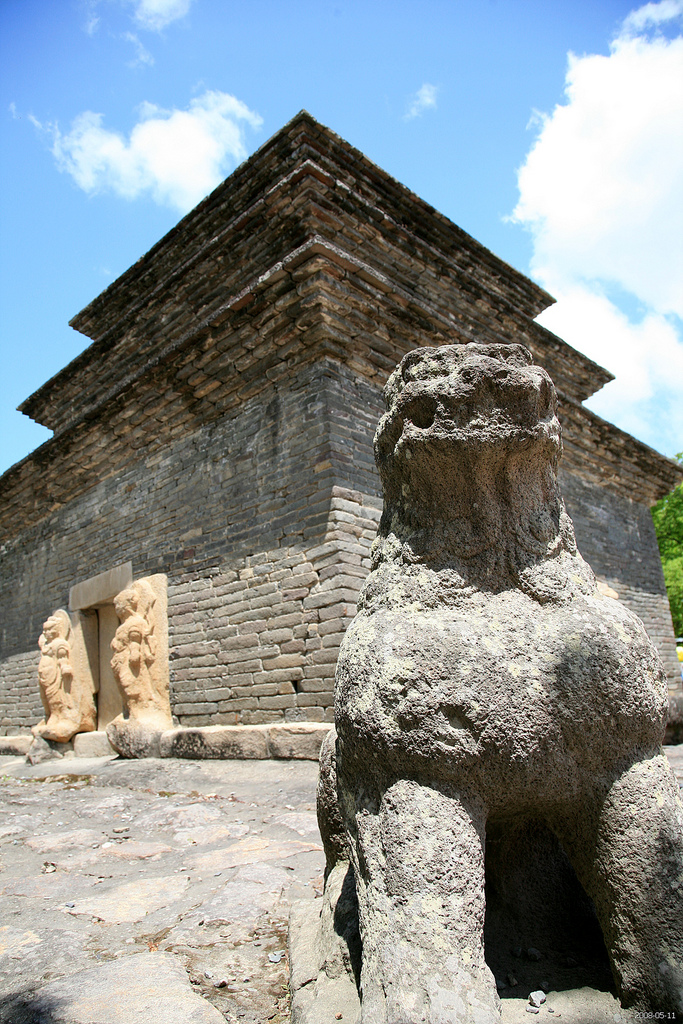
- The pagoda at Bunhwangsa (2009)

Location
- Interactive map of Bunhwangsa
- Coordinates: 35°50′26″N 129°14′01″E

Architecture
- Founder: Queen Seondeok of Silla
- Completed: 634
- UNESCO World Heritage Site
- Official name: Gyeongju Historic Areas
- Criteria: Cultural: (ii), (iii)
- Designated: 2000
- Reference no.: 976
- Historic Sites of South Korea
- Designated: 2019-02-26
- Reference no.: 548

Korean name
- Hangul: 분황사
- Hanja: 芬皇寺
- RR: Bunhwangsa
- MR: Punhwangsa

Bunhwangsa (Korean: 분황사; lit. 'Fragrant Imperial Temple') is a temple complex from the Old Silla era of Korea. It is located in Gyeongju. The temple is recorded to have been built in 634 under the auspices of Queen Seondeok. Today the temple is still used by a small group of worshipers but in its heyday, the temple covered several acres and was one of the four main temples of the Silla Kingdom used by the state to ask the Buddha to bless the kingdom. The ruins of Hwangnyongsa lay nearby. It is part of the UNESCO world heritage site Gyeongju Historic Areas.

== National Treasure No. 30 ==
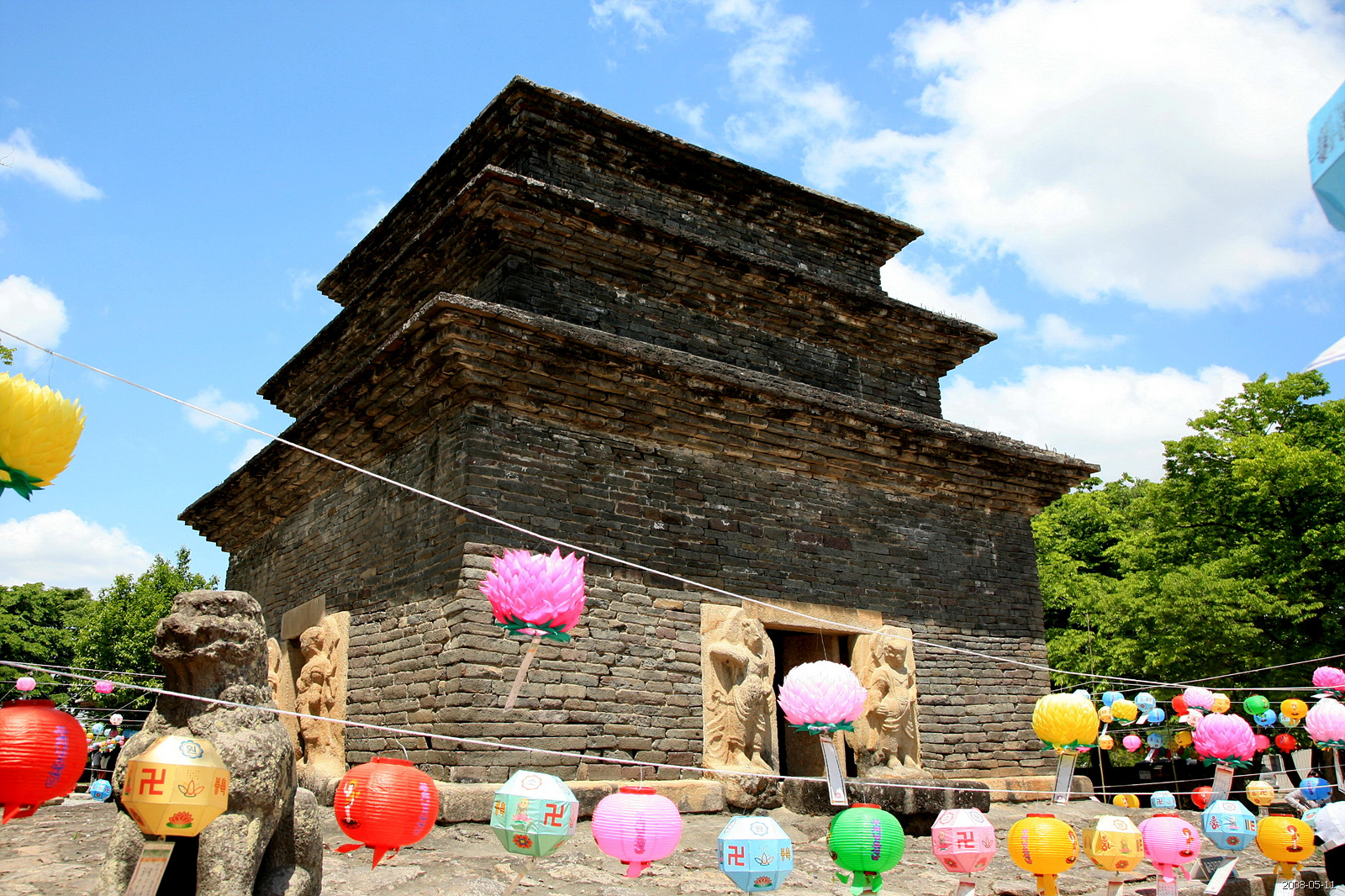
Bunhwangsa Pagoda around Buddha's Birthday.

A notable ruin at the temple is the Bunhwangsa Pagoda (Kr. Bunhwangsa Seoktap, literally "Stone Pagoda of Bunhwangsa"), the oldest dated pagoda from the Silla Kingdom. The pagoda is National Treasure of Korea No. 30 and was designated by the South Korean government on December 20, 1962. The pagoda is based on prototypes from the Tang dynasty in China. However, unlike Tang pagodas which were made from brick, Silla architects used stones of black andesite cut like brick. Each story of the pagoda is progressively smaller in size and each story's roof is made by placing bricks in a staircase-like fashion. Today, only three tiers of the pagoda remain. Ancient records state the pagoda originally stood nine stories tall.

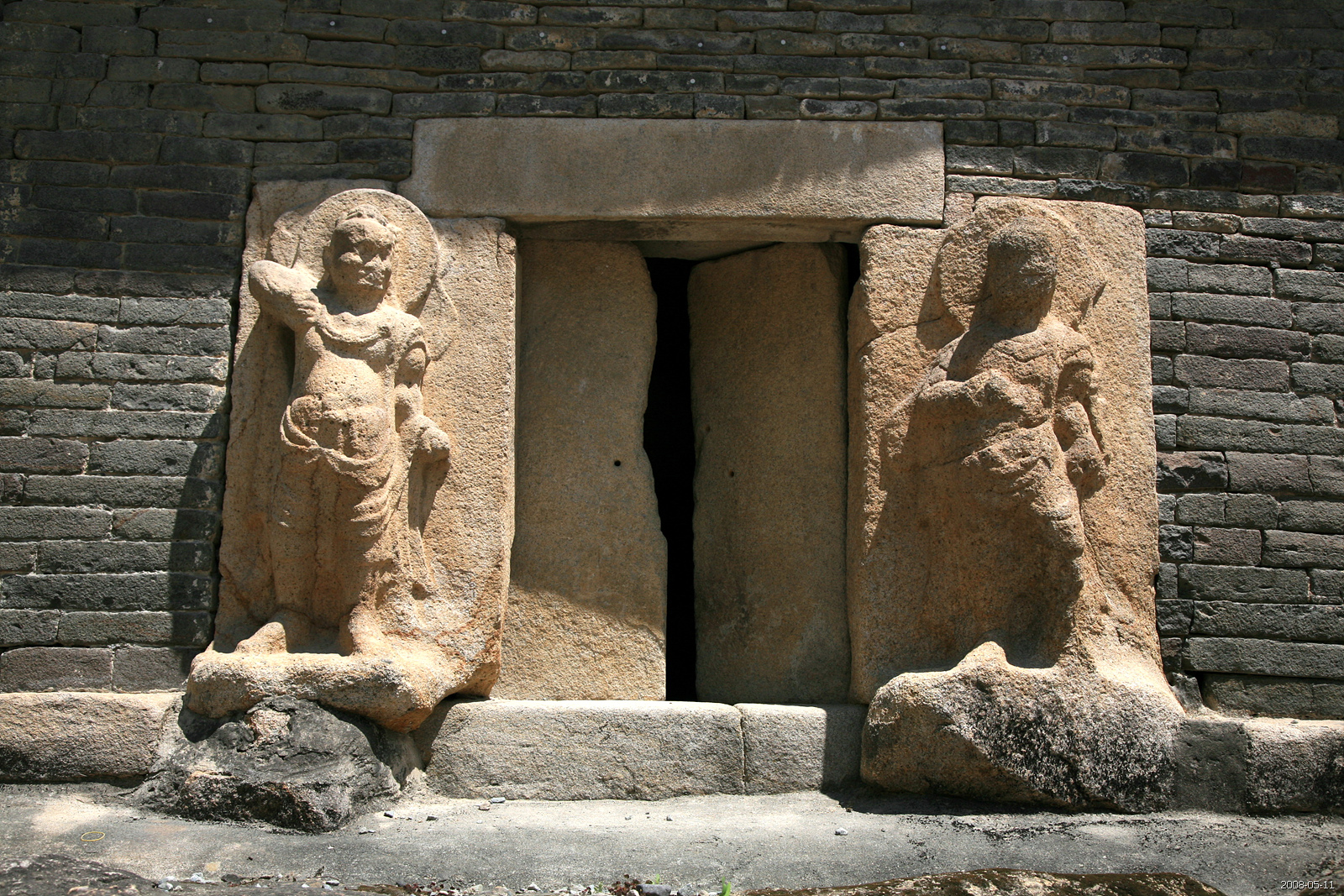
A close up view of one of the pairs of Mighty Diamond Men. Also, note the debris visible within the doorway.

Although once hollow, the collapsed stories of the pagoda have filled the center of pagoda with debris. An excavation and partial restoration in 1915 by the Japanese uncovered a sarira, or relic box, of the cremated remains of a priest hidden in between the second and third stories. Precious artifacts such as gold and stone ornaments, coins, scissors, and a needle were also found in the pagoda which indicated that a woman of royal blood, perhaps even Queen Seondeok herself, had once owned the objects. Each side of the pagoda has what may have once been doors into the interior of the pagoda. Two figures guard each doorway and are known as Geumgan-yeoksa (literally "Mighty Diamond Men" from Skt "vajra-yakṣa") or Inwangsang, guardians of the Buddhist canon. Each corner of the one-step platform upon which the pagoda rests holds a guardian lion statue. Granite lotus blossoms also adorn the pagoda.

A contemporaneous pair of stone pagodas were built at the Baekje Mireuksa and the Bunhwangsa Pagoda is often compared with them although those stone pagodas more closely imitated wood architectural styles.

== Gyeongsangbuk-do Cultural Property Material No. 9 ==
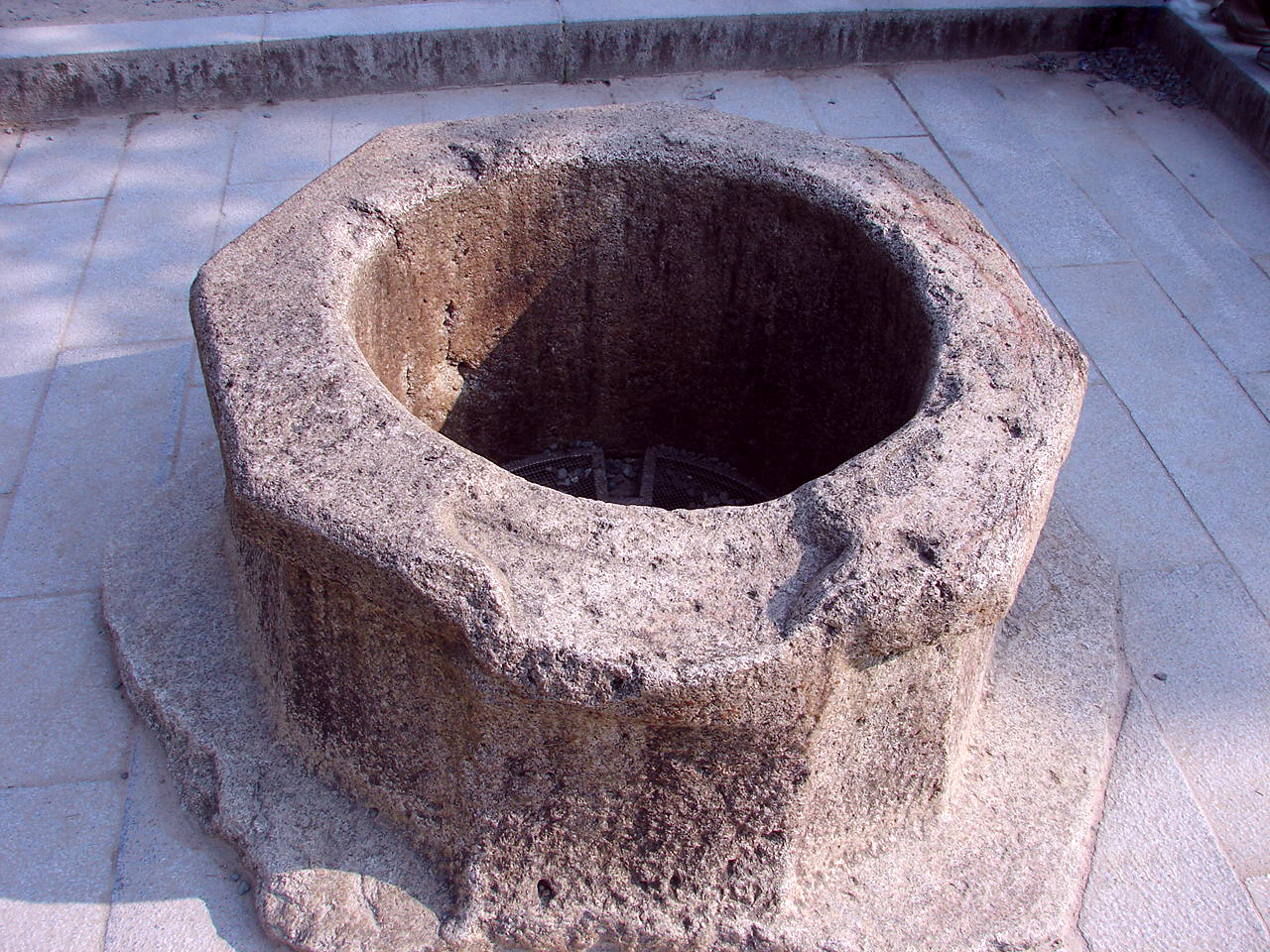
Bunhwangsa Hogukyongbyeoneojeong

Located at the temple complex is a well called Hogukyongbyeoneojeong (호국용변어정) or Samnyongbyeoneojeong from the Silla period. The well's octagonal upper part extends above the ground 70 cm/27.6 in height while the lower part of the well is cylindrical. The structure of the well represents Buddhism's essence.

=== Legend ===
According to legend in the Samguk yusa, in 795, the 11th year of King Wonseong, missionaries from the Tang dynasty visited Silla. The missionaries changed three dragons protecting Silla into small fish and took them away to Tang China with them, hidden in bamboo.

The next day two women, identifying themselves as two of the dragons' wives, living in Dongji (pond) and Cheongji (pond), came to the king and asked the king to retrieve their dragon husbands taken away by the Tang missionaries. The king immediately sent his men in to bring back the dragons, permitting them live in the Bunhwangsa well.

== Gyeongsangbuk-do Tangible Cultural Property No. 97 ==
Monument pedestal of Hwajaengguksa (화쟁국사) erected in 1101 at the wish of King Sukjong. Only the stele, with its original calligraphy, remains. This monument appeared to have been destroyed in 1597 (the 30th year of King Seonjo's reign) when the temple was destroyed, and only the pedestal of the monument was left. The historical research of Chusa Kim Chŏnghŭi, who visited the temple at the end of the Joseon dynasty, revealed that it was a monument erected by Wonhyo. Some of the inscriptions were written on the site of the Daedonggeumseokseo, which was discovered in the Bunhwangsa Temple compound in 1976, and are located in the museum of Dongguk university.

== Gyeongsangbuk-do Cultural Property Material No. 317 ==
Yaksayeorae (약세여래), a statue built in 1774, during the 50th year of King Yeongjo.

== Flagpole holder ==
Also of note is the flagpole holder which survives from the Silla era.
