= Namsan (Gyeongju) =

Mountain in Gyeongju, South Korea

Coordinates: 35°46′05″N 129°13′32″E

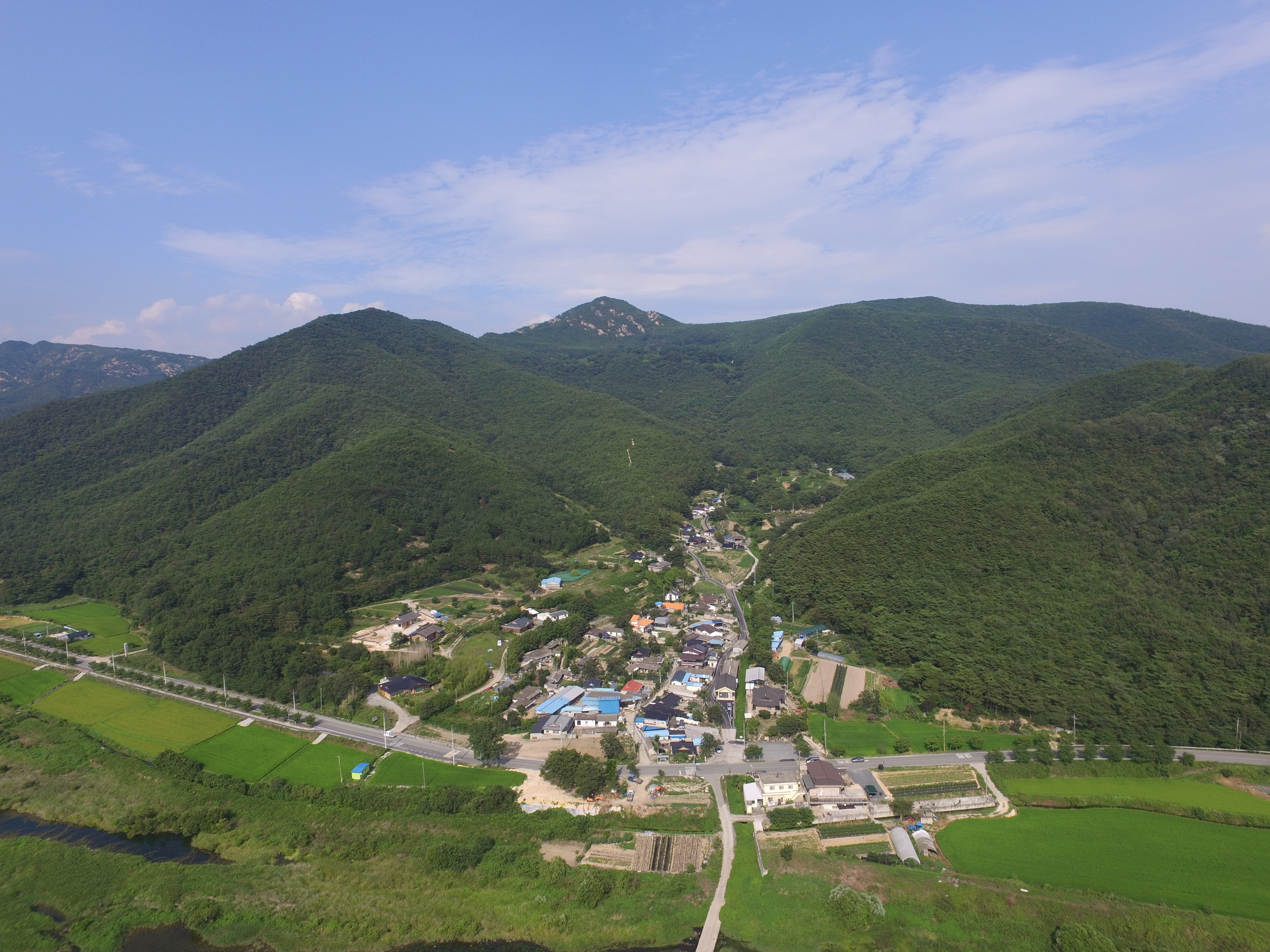
- Looking east to Namsan (2017)

Highest point
- Elevation: 494 m (1,621 ft)

Geography
- Location: Gyeongju, South Korea

UNESCO World Heritage Site
- Official name: Gyeongju Historic Areas
- Criteria: Cultural: (ii), (iii)
- Designated: 2000
- Reference no.: 976

Historic Sites of South Korea
- Official name: Archaeological Area of Namsan Mountain, Gyeongju
- Designated: 1985-02-23

Korean name
- Hangul: 남산
- Hanja: 南山
- RR: Namsan
- MR: Namsan

Namsan (Korean: 남산; lit. 'south mountain') is a 494-meter peak in the heart of Gyeongju National Park, just south of Gyeongju, South Korea. The mountain is within easy reach from the city and attracts a large number of domestic tourists. Namsan covers an area of about 8 km (north-south) by 12 km (east-west). Some 180 peaks are counted, of which Geumobong (468 m) and Gouibong (495 m) are the best-known. There are about 40 valleys.

== Cultural remains ==
Namsan is home to many historic and cultural remains, and is now part of the historic area around Gyeongju that was added to the UNESCO list of World Heritage in 2000.

Namsan is home to many remains from the Silla period, including some tombs of Silla rulers. There are hundreds of remains scattered around the mountain. Poseokjeong is one of the most famous of these sites, lying at the foot of Namsan. Other remains include Korean Buddhist art, sculptures, about 80 carved reliefs, about 60 stone pagodas and remains of about 100 temples and palaces mostly built between the 7th and 10th century. 12 of these relicts are designated national treasures. It also contains the ruins of the fortress Namsansinseong.

The concentration of remains is particularly high at the foothills west of Namsan. The remains are thought to reflect the rise and fall of the Silla kingdom. Najeong Well is the mystic birthplace of King Park Hyeokgeose, founder of the Silla dynasty. Only a small stone with inscriptions remains of this site. According to legend, one day in 69 BC Seobeol—chieftain of Goheo village—spotted a white horse kneeling by Najeong well. When approaching the site to take a closer look, the horse disappeared, but he found an egg. From the egg hatched a boy who was chosen to become king at the age of 13.

The Yangsanjae shrine was built in honour of a founder who lived in Seorabeol before the Silla kingdom was established. A famous site is the three stone Buddha statue of Bae-ri. The site features three Buddha figures carved into stone. More recently, a roof was erected to protect the statues.

The sitting stone statue of Buddha in the Mireuk valley, the sitting image of Bodhisattva carved into a stone wall at Sinseonam are two of the designated national treasures. In addition, there are sites of local significance, such as the sitting figure of Sakyamuni carved on a rock in Samneung Valley. This figure is about 7 metres high and about 5 metres wide. It is the biggest sitting statue at Namsam.

Cheongwansa is a historic temple.

== Nature ==
Namsan is not only known for the Silla remains, but also appreciated by visitors for its natural environment.

== Gallery ==
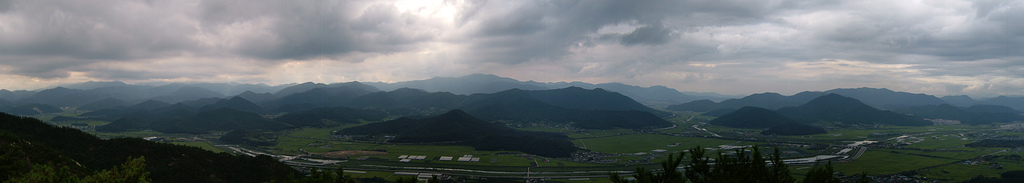

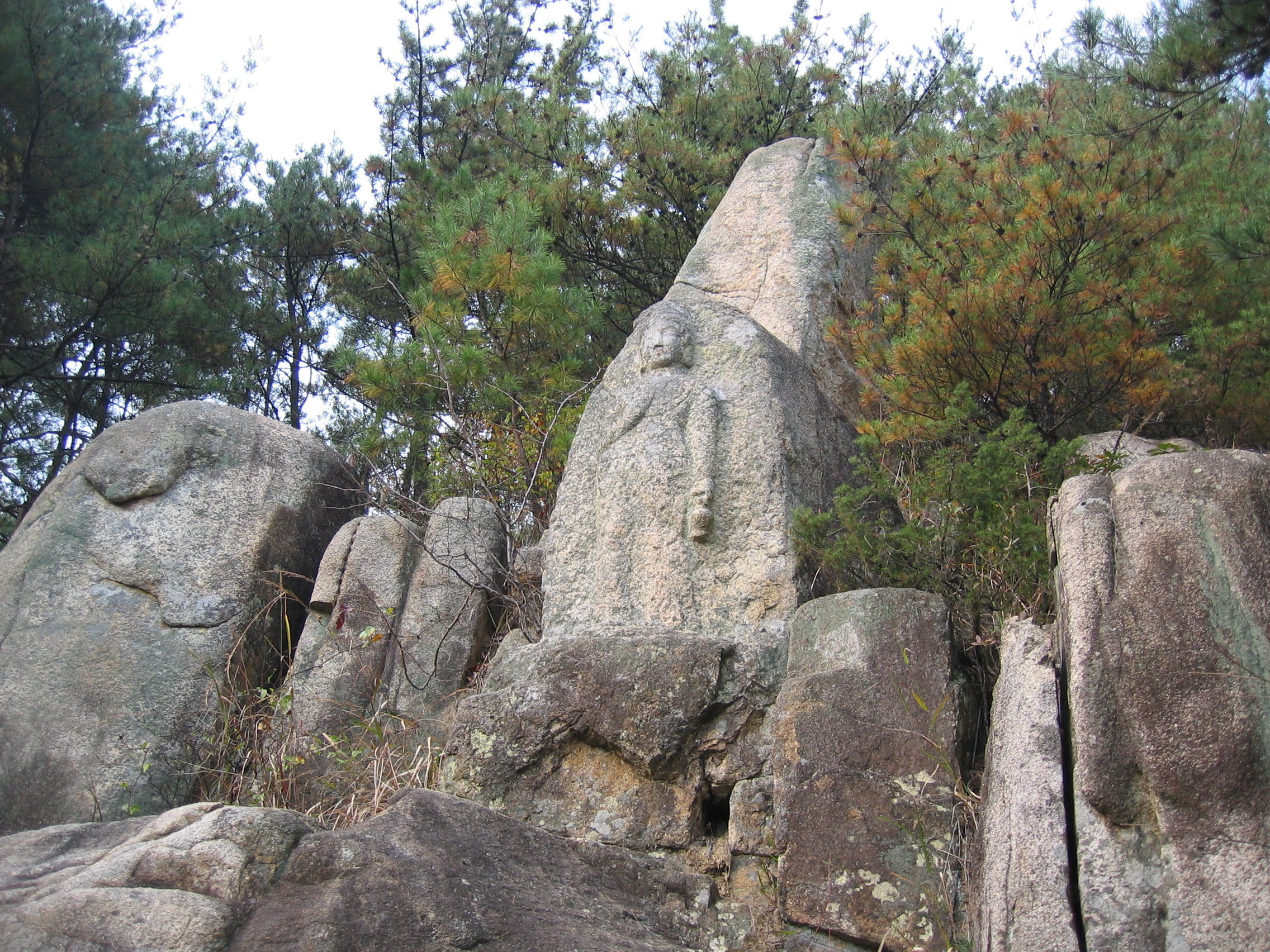

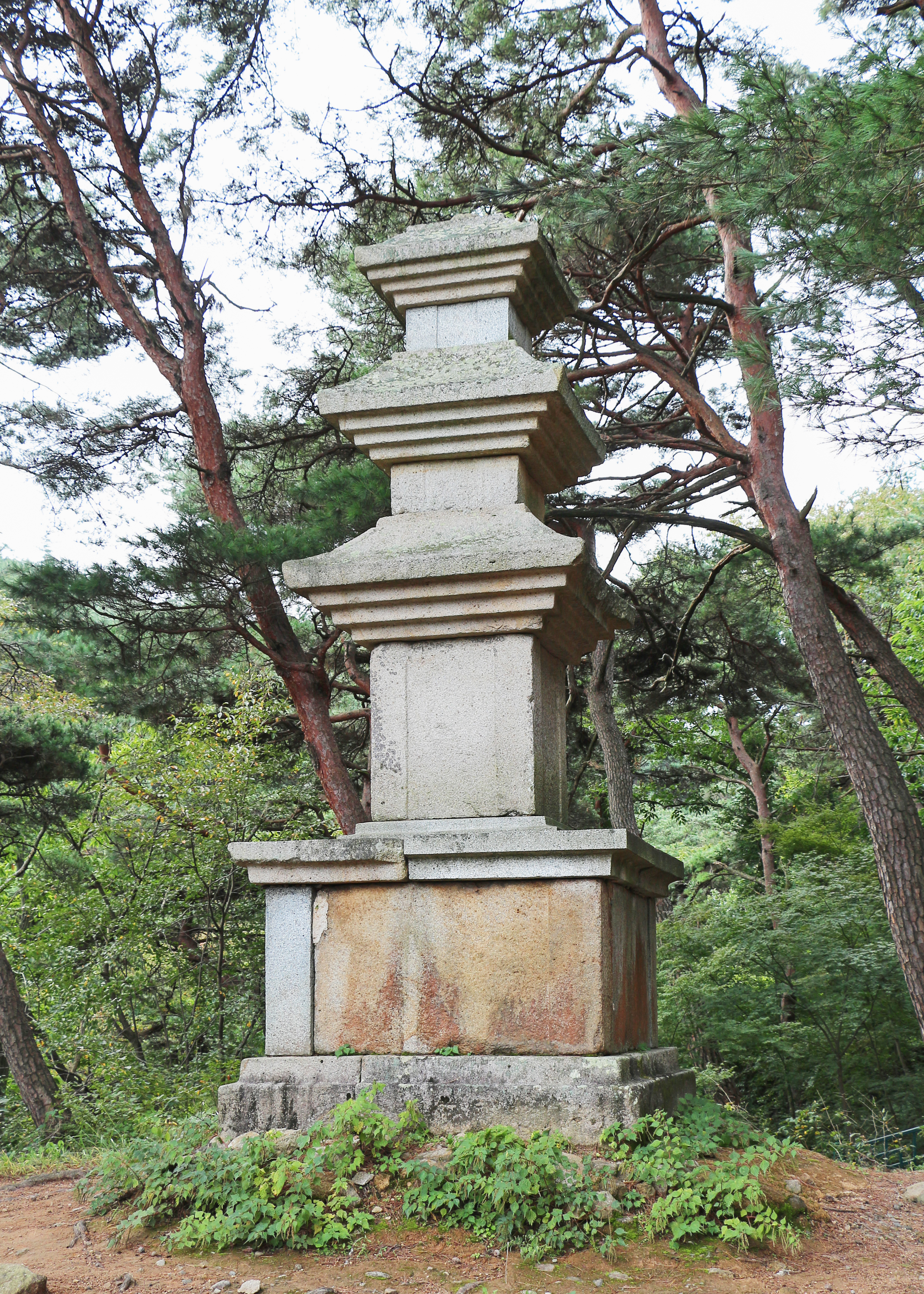
Stone pagoda on Namsan

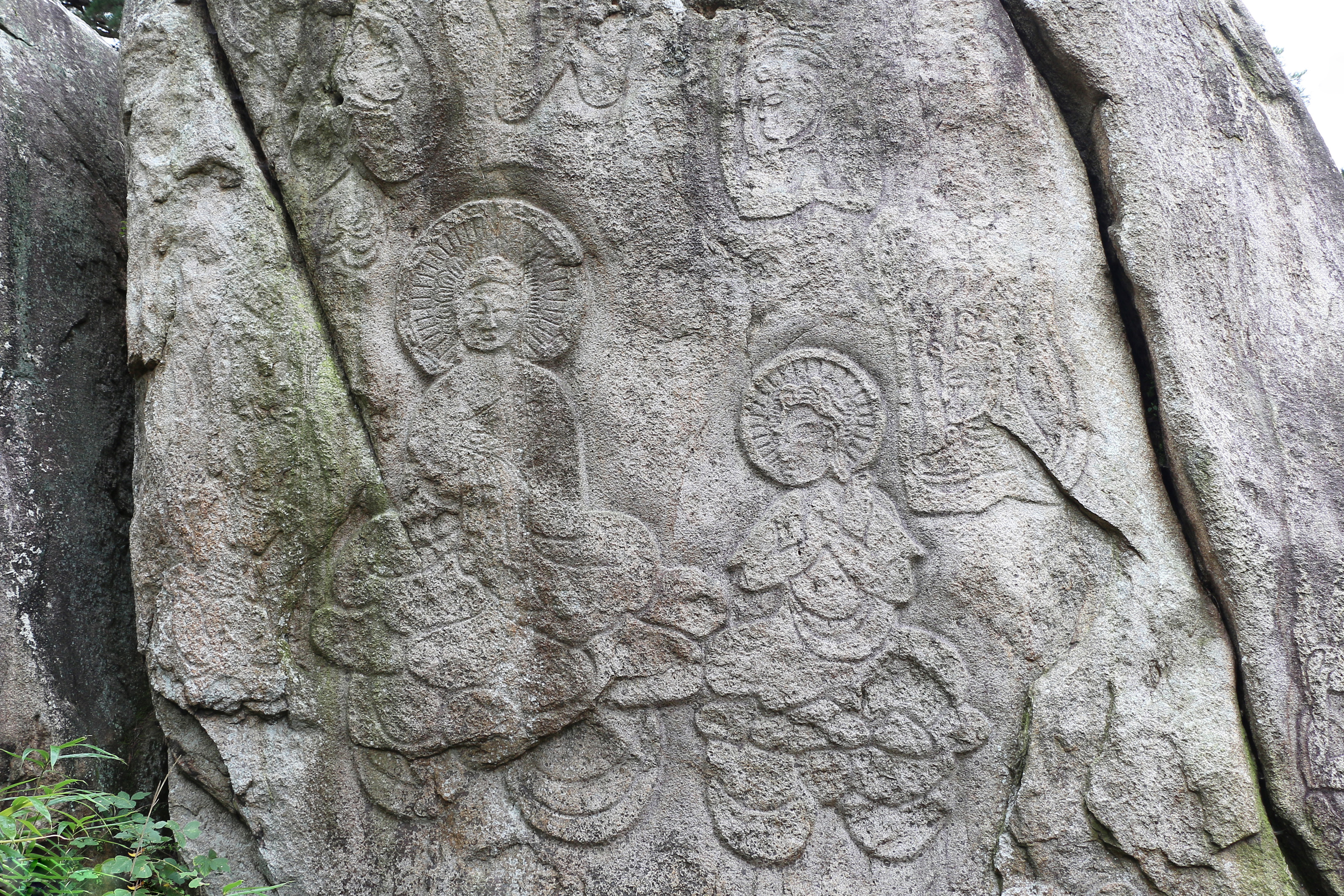
Buddha relief carved into stone in Tapgok Valley

== See also ==
- List of mountains in Korea
