= Taejang Ceremony =

Korean ceremonial practice

Taejang was a Korean ceremony, in which the parents buried a newborn's placenta or Tae in a special place on a special day. Tae means umbilical cord. Jang is a ceremony in which something is buried.

== History ==
Korean ancestors considered Tae to be the root of life, and took it in custody. It originated from Dogyo and Pungsujiriseol (a theory of location based on topography) which emphasized the importance of life above all else.

Koreans didn't throw away Tae, because it was the symbol of precious life. Instead, they buried it in a holy area. Koreans believed a kind of qi lived in natural things, such as trees, water and mountains. The first record of Taejang is Kim Yushin's Taejang in Samguk Sagi. In 595, the wife of Manogun-governor Kim Soehyeon reportedly gave birth to a son after 20 months' pregnancy. The son was Kim Yushin, who became a general. Yushin's mother buried the Tae at the foot of Mt. Taeryeng. Goryeo Dynasty and Joseon Dynasty also kept the Taejang culture. In the Joseon Dynasty, the royal family attached great importance to Tae.

In 1439, King Sejong appointed Jigwans who were in charge of finding holy places for Taeshil. Thus, King Sejong kept all his sons' Tae in Seongju.

== Geographical elements ==
Tae signified life and destiny. In order to wish newborns good luck, Korean ancestors kept Tae in a special place, and buried it in a holy place. The place was chosen according to Pungsujiriseol. The best place for Tae was considered to be semisphere-formed land that was at a higher altitude than the surroundings, but it could not be linked with the top of a mountain. If Tae was buried in such a holy place, the baby was believed to live a healthy, successful, and long life. People strongly had a belief that if Tae was buried in good earth, the baby would have good energies from the earth.

The royal family put Tae in a ceramic ware, and then installed it in a holy place. Areas or villages which had a holy place for Tae were called Taesil, Taebong and Taejang. More than 20 areas have such names in South Korea. For example, in Gyeonggi province: Yeoncheongun Jungmyeon Taebong-burag, Pocheongun Yeongjungmyeon Taebong-burag, Gapyeonggun Namsanmyeon Yangtaebong-burag and Gapyeonggun Sangmyeon Taebong-burag are areas that have such geographical features.

== Ceremonies ==
When delivering a baby, people didn't use an iron-knife to cut Tae. They believed an iron-knife could cause infection. Usually, they used a bamboo-knife instead.

They washed Tae, and kept it in pottery. The quality and the form of the pottery were different according to their social status. The common people used a clay-pot, and the royal family used a special ceramic ware. The royal family had a special ceremony at the moment when Tae was about to be placed in the ceramic ware, and when it was to be buried in the earth.

During the Joseon Dynasty, special places were called Taeshil or Taebong. Stone monuments called Taebi were erected there. Taebi consists of dragon-shaped headstones and turtle-shaped pedestals. The purpose was to wish healthy and long lives, and a wisdom to the king.
