= Silla–Tang War =

670–676 conflict between Tang China and the Silla kingdom of Korea

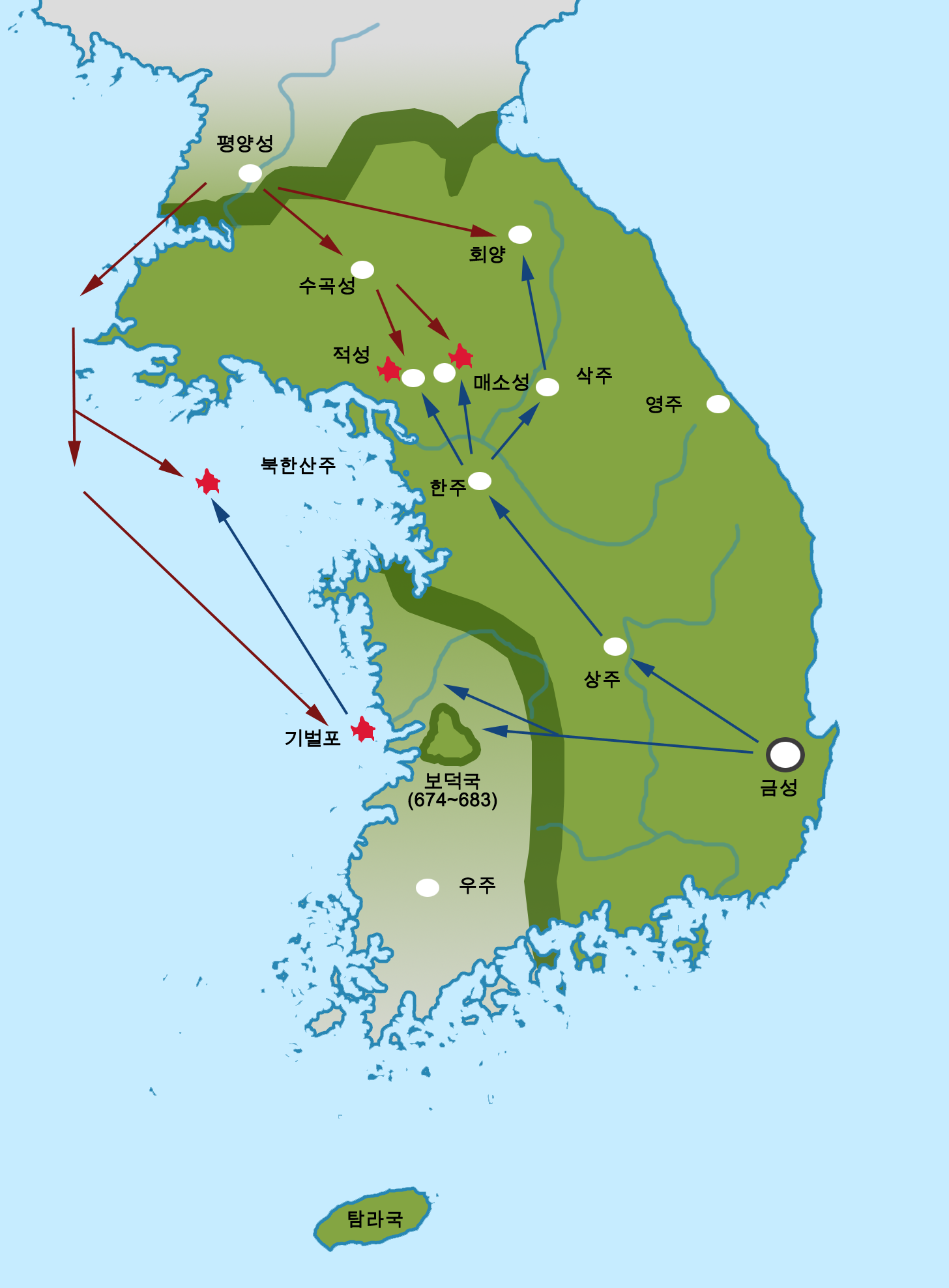
- Map of the Silla-Tang War (in Korean), with final northern border of Silla marked in dark green line. Red arrows indicate Tang attack routes; blue arrows indicate Silla attack routes; explosion marks indicate battles.
Date	670–676
Location	Korean Peninsula and Yellow Sea
Result	Silla victory
Territorial changes	Silla recaptured the territory south of Taedong River, while Tang held control over former Goguryeo territory north of Taedong River.

Belligerents
Silla; Goguryeo loyalists Baekje loyalists	Tang dynasty

Commanders and leaders
Munmu of Silla; Kim Yushin; Geom Mojam; Kim Wonsul; Go Yeonmu	Xue Rengui; Gao Kan; Buyeo Yung; Li Jinxing

The Silla–Tang War (670–676) occurred between the Silla kingdom of Korea (joined by Goguryeo and Baekje loyalists) and the Tang dynasty of China. It began in the geopolitical context immediately following the conquest of Goguryeo and Baekje by the joint forces of Silla and Tang.

Due to the internal political situation in both Silla and Tang, the conflict ended in a truce and Tang withdrawal from the Korean Peninsula south of the Taedong River. The subsequent territorial line between Tang and Unified Silla extended from the mouth of the Taedong River in the west to the East Korea Bay.

== Context ==
After the Goguryeo-Tang War ended in 668, the Korean kingdoms of Baekje and Goguryeo were occupied by the Silla–Tang alliance. A substantial number of people in the territories of the two former kingdoms were forcibly resettled by the Tang. Emperor Gaozong of Tang created the office of Protectorate General to Pacify the East to administer the conquered territories. Goguryeo's territory was divided into 9 commanderies, 42 prefectures, and 100 counties. The protectorate was based in Pyongyang.

King Munmu of Silla assembled an army incorporating not just Sillan people but also the remnants of the Baekje and Goguryeo military in a coalition against the Tang army. The Sillan army engaged Tang forces in combat to eject them from the Korean Peninsula (particularly the entirety of what was formerly Baekje and some of the southern portions of what was formerly Goguryeo) and prevent any Tang attempts to control Silla.

== Course ==
Silla's efforts were aided by revolts/uprisings in the territories of the former Korean kingdoms, notably Goguryeo; the first revolt of the people of Goguryeo took place in 669. Revolts in the former territories of Goguryeo took place for several subsequent years, the last of which endured for four years.

From 670 to 673 the rebels launched an uprising every year, the last of which lasted for four years. In 671, Silla drove Tang forces out of most of Baekje's former territory. Silla was angered by Emperor Gaozong of Tang. Originally Emperor Taizong of Tang promised to exchange Baekje and the lands south of Pyongyang in return for Silla's military cooperation. However Taizong died before the conquest of Goguryeo was completed, and his successor Gaozong reneged on the promise.

In February 675 the Tang attacked Silla and defeated them at Chiljung Fortress in Gyeonggi. In response Munmu of Silla dispatched a tributary mission to Tang with apologies. Gaozong accepted Munmu's apologies and withdrew Tang troops to deal with the Tibetan threat in the west. Seeing the Tang's strategic weakness, Silla renewed the advance on Tang territory.

Xue Rengui crossed the Yellow Sea to provide supplies for the troops of general Li Jinxing in their fight against Silla. Xue Rengui laid siege to Cheonseong in September 765 but was defeated and fled, resulting in the death of 1,400 Tang soldiers and the capture of 1,000 horses and 40 warships by Silla. Li Jinxing was forced to retreat and reorganize his troops before fighting several battles in northern Gyeonggi, after which they retreated due to the cold weather, ending their campaign in the Maeso region near present-day Yeoncheon. According to the Samguk Sagi, Li Jinxing led 200,000 soldiers in the Battle of Maeso fortress in September 675 and they were defeated, leading to the capture of 30,080 war horses and a comparable number of weapons.

Another reading of the source by Kim Byeong-Hee interprets the line natpuhaenggo as the Silla troops attacking a Tang army that was already retreating and had abandoned their warhorses as well as weapons. Kim argues that the Tang army's supplies were dwindling at that point and they had already started to retreat. The 200,000 strong Tang army stated to have participated in the Battle of Maeso was likely an estimate of the entire Tang army involved in the campaign since Maeso fortress was in a mountain area that was too small to even accommodate the 30,080 horses captured. Kim sees the 200,000 Tang troops as a symbolic figure representing all Tang forces deployed on the Korean frontier. Furthermore, Kim states that both Chinese and Korean sources omit or downplay battles where their side lost, with the Zizhi Tongjian stating that the initial invasion resulted in a base of operations at Maeso fortress, implying that it was captured, whereas the Samguk Sagi makes no such mention. The Samguk Sagi mentions the Battle of Maeso resulting in a Silla victory whereas the Zizhi Tongjian does not mention it. Due to the prior possession of Maeso by the Tang, had combat taken place, it would have involved a numerically inferior Silla force attacking a mountain fortress held by a larger Tang army, which Kim considers unlikely to have occurred. Immediately after the Battle of Maeso, there are records of a combined Tang, Khitan, and Mohe attack on Chiljung Fortress, which Kim interprets as the action of retreating Tang forces. The theory of a Tang retreat from Maeso without any major combat is further supported by the later career of Li Jinxing, who received no significant punishment for the incident and was redeployed to the Tibetan front in the west.

In 676, Silla took all the territory south of the Taedong River in a series of battles that ended with a Silla victory at Gibeolpo in November. The exact details of the battle are unknown other than the names of the generals involved and that it was a naval battle. The Tang were forced to relocate the seat of the Protectorate General to Pacify the East to the more easily defensible city of Liaoyang.

== Aftermath ==
The Tang government's relocation of the seat/capital of the Protectorate General to Pacify the East to Liaodong was effectively the end of Tang designs on Sillan territory. Although the Tang forces were expelled from territories south of Taedong River, Silla failed to regain the former Goguryeo territories north of the Taedong River, which were now under Tang dominion. The Tang empire took control of the Liaodong Peninsula while Silla controlled most of the Korean Peninsula. Later, most of the land north of the Taedong River went to Balhae. Relations between Tang and Silla ceased until the early 8th century, when King Seongdeok of Silla (702–737) and Emperor Xuanzong of Tang (712–755) reestablished diplomatic ties and initiated a reconciliation between the states. A formal Tang recognition of Sillan sovereignty over the Korean Peninsula south of the Taedong River occurred in 736.

== See also ==
- Baekje–Tang War
- Goguryeo–Tang War
- Battle of Maeso
- Protectorate General to Pacify the East

== Bibliography ==
- Wang, Zhenping (2013), Tang China in Multi-Polar Asia: A History of Diplomacy and War, University of Hawaii Press
- Xiong, Victor (2008), Historical Dictionary of Medieval China, United States of America: Scarecrow Press, Inc., ISBN 978-0810860537
