= Ki no Miyako =

Court lady of the Nara period

Ki no Miyako (紀 宮子) was a Japanese court lady of the Nara period. She was the consort of Emperor Kōnin and held the court rank of Junior Third Rank.

== Life ==
Miyako was the daughter of Vice-Governor (suke) of Sagami Province Ki no Inade. Her grandfather was Senior Assistant Minister of Ceremonial Ki no Komaro. Though the specific date is unknown, Miyako entered the inner palace of Emperor Kōnin and became his consort.

In 776, she was promoted from the court rank of Junior Fifth Rank to Senior Fifth Rank. The next year, she was promoted to Junior Fourth Rank. In 783, after the death of the Emperor, she was promoted to Senior Fourth Rank along with Fujiwara no Ubuko, Fujiwara no Kyōki, and Heguri Ōtoji, who were also the consorts of Emperor Kōnin. On the new year's day of 786, Miyako, along with Tachibana no Matsuga and Fujiwara no Moroane, was promoted to Junior Third Rank. These promotions have been attributed to Miyako's blood relation to Ki no Tochihime, the birth mother of Emperor Kōnin.
