= Kim Wŏnsul =

Korean general (fl. 7th century)

- Hangul: 김원술
- Hanja: 金元述
- RR: Gim Wonsul
- MR: Kim Wŏnsul

Kim Wŏnsul (Korean: 김원술; Hanja: 金元述, before 660-675?) was a Silla military commander who served under Silla's 30th ruler, King Munmu, and played a major role in defending the kingdom against Tang China's invaders after the conquest of both Goguryeo and Baekje by the year 668.He was the second son of the Silla General Kim Yu-sin.

== Background ==
Kim Wŏnsul was the second son of General Kim Yu-sin, and direct descendant of King Suro, the founder of Geumgwan Gaya. Kim Wŏnsul was a member of the Silla's Jinggol class, and rose to the rank of Low-level general by the time of Goguryeo's fall to the Silla-Tang Alliance.

== Unification Wars ==
In 660, the kingdom of Baekje fell to the armies of the Silla-Tang Alliance. Baekje was then followed by the kingdom of Goguryeo, which fell in 668 to the Silla-Tang Alliance as well. General Kim Yu-sin's reputation as the greatest general of Silla rose during these Unification Wars.

General Wŏnsul was near Baeksu Castle in August of the year 672, fighting Tang dynasty troops. Silla troops seemed to be winning the battle at the beginning. However, they chased the retreating Chinese troops and fell into a trap that killed seven generals and countless soldiers. As Wŏnsul realized that defeat was unavoidable, he prepared to die by jumping into the enemy lines. His staff, however, blocked him and said, “It is not difficult for a brave man to die. What’s more difficult is to choose when to die. Dying worthless is worse than revenging later." Wŏnsul answered, “A man never lives a humiliating life" and then whipped his horse to make a dash. His staff, however, held the horse by the bridle and did not let go. Wŏnsul could not die at the battle and returned to Gyeongju.

== Later life and death ==
Kim Yu-sin, a former hwarang, asked King Munmu to execute Wŏnsul for retreating from battlefield instead of dying with honour. He was earnest about the execution because Silla lost as many as seven generals in the battle. King Munmu, however, refused to punish Wŏnsul. However, his father, Kim Yu-sin, disowned Wŏnsul as his son. Being ashamed of himself and afraid of facing his father, Wŏnsul hid in a secluded area.

In June 673, people witnessed several dozen crying soldiers in armor with weapons in their hands walking out of Yu-sin's home. Then, they vanished without a trace. Hearing about the strange incident, Yu-sin said, "They were the heavenly guardian soldiers who protected me. Now, my luck ran out. I shall die very soon." On July 1, 673, General Kim Yu-sin died at 79.

Wŏnsul returned home to attend his father's funeral. However, his mother, Lady Chiso, rejected him, although he was accused wrongfully of being a coward. She said, "How can I be the mother of a son who was not a son to his father." Kim Wŏnsul cried and returned to his hiding place.

In September 675, Wŏnsul returned to fight the invading Tang at the Battle of Maeso. He fought as if anxious to die on the battlefield. As a result, he achieved a great victory over the Tang troops. When the war was over, Kim Chunchu awaited his presence to award him in Gyeongju highly. He, however, never returned to Gyeongju and went deep into the mountains regretting his impiety to his parents.

== Death ==
Kim Wŏnsul spent the rest of his days, starving in the mountains, and died in an unknown year at an early age.

== In popular culture ==
- Portrayed by Baek Seung-woo in the 2012–2013 KBS1 TV series Dream of the Emperor.

== See also ==
- Three Kingdoms of Korea
- Silla-Tang War
- Munmu of Silla
