= Princess Sakahito =

Japanese princess and saiō, wife of Emperor Kanmu

Princess Sakahito 酒人内親王

Saiō
- Tenure: 772 – 775
- Predecessor: Princess Abe (Saiō) (Note: At the time she did not yet have the title of "Imperial Princess" (Naishinnō) and instead was simply a princess (Joō). Before her father's ascension to the throne she was known as Princess Yamao (山於女王))
- Successor: Princess Kiyoniwa
- Born: 754
- Died: September 25, 829
- Spouse: Emperor Kanmu
- Issue: Princess Asahara
- House: Imperial House of Japan
- Father: Emperor Kōnin
- Mother: Princess Inoe
- Religion: Shinto

Princess Sakahito (酒人内親王, Sakahito Naishinnō; 754 – September 25, 829) was a Japanese princess, born a daughter of Emperor Kōnin.

Her mother was reported to be Princess Inoue—a daughter of Emperor Shōmu, but there is another theory that her mother was Takano no Niigasa.

== Life ==
Born to Emperor Kōnin and Princess Inoe in 754, her early life is not well recorded.

Emperor Kōnin came to the throne in 770, and two years later, in 772, Sakahito became the Saiō of Ise Shrine.

Her mother, Princess Inoe, was accused of witchcraft and deposed. Sakahito's brother, Prince Osabe, who was the crown prince, was also deposed. Sakahito was unaffected (in terms of rank) by any changes, however it is believed she resigned out of grief.

Sakahito returned to Nara where her father may have planned to make her his heir. Sakahito, through her father, was of the Tenji line, the descendents of Emperor Tenji. Through her mother, she was of the Tenmu line. This would have unified the two lines. However this failed likely due to the controversy surrounding the reign of Empress Shōtoku, rendering the court nobles wary of enthroning another female emperor. When Prince Yamabe eventually came to the throne as Emperor Kanmu, he opted to take Sakahito as his wife.

Princess Sakahito was known as a beautiful and (during her time as saiō at least) gentle woman, but also a very sexual woman. Emperor Kanmu however was supposedly indulgent of her behaviour, and never reproached her.

The Nihon Kōki writes of her that:

Her countenance was exceptionally fair. Her form was slender and graceful. She enjoyed the Emperor Kanmu's favour in full measure. Her nature was haughty and arrogant, her affections unrestrained. The Emperor forbade her not, but left her to her own desires. Her licentious conduct grew ever more pronounced, and she was incapable of self-restraint.

Sakahito gave the emperor one child, a daughter named Princess Asahara.

Sakahito outlived her daughter however, who died in 817 at age 39.

In 829 at age 76, Princess Sakahito died.

== Genealogy ==
Parents

- Father: Emperor Kōnin (光仁天皇, November 18, 708 – January 11, 782)
- Mother: Princess Inoe (井上内親王, 717–775)

Husband and children

- Emperor Kanmu, husband and half brother
  - Daughter: Princess Asahara (朝原内親王; 779 - May 14, 817)
