= Battle of Maeso =

675 battle

- Part of the Silla–Tang War
Date	September 29, 675
Location	Yeoncheon County, South Korea
Result	Silla victory

Belligerents
Silla	Tang

Commanders and leaders
Kim Wonsul	Li Jinxing

Strength
30,000	200,000

Casualties and losses
Unknown	6,047 killed 30,380 horses and weapons of 30,000 captured

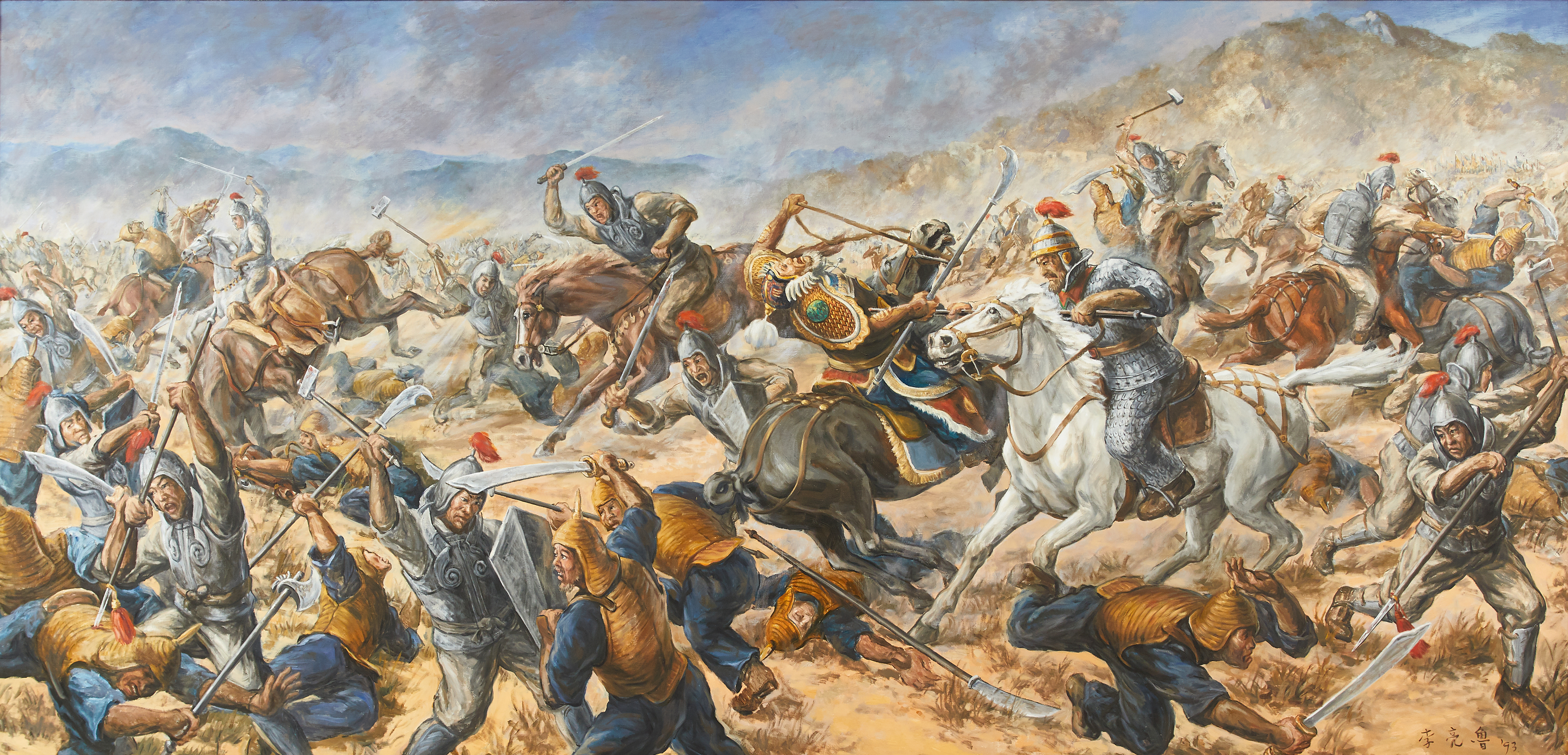
Battle of Maeso

The Battle of Maeso (Korean: 매소성 전투; Hanja: 買肖城戰鬪) took place between Silla and Tang forces in the Korean Peninsula. On September 29, 675, a confrontation occurred between Silla's forces under the command of Kim Wonsul and a Tang army nder Li Jinxing. The Sillan army was composed of Sillan soldiers, former prisoners issued amnesty in exchange for participating in the battle, as well as refugees from Goguryeo and Baekje. Li Jinxing was a Tang general of Mohe-origin.

According to the Samguk Sagi, Li Jinxing led 200,000 soldiers in the Battle of Maeso fortress in September 675 and they were defeated, leading to the capture of 30,080 war horses and a comparable number of weapons.

Another reading of the source by Kim Byeong-Hee interprets the line natpuhaenggo as the Silla troops attacking a Tang army that was already retreating and had abandoned their warhorses as well as weapons. Kim argues that the Tang army's supplies were dwindling at that point and they had already started to retreat. The 200,000 strong Tang army stated to have participated in the Battle of Maeso was likely an estimate of the entire Tang army involved in the campaign since Maeso fortress was in a mountain area that was too small to even accommodate the 30,080 horses captured. Kim sees the 200,000 Tang troops as a symbolic figure representing all Tang forces deployed on the Korean frontier. Furthermore, Kim states that both Chinese and Korean sources omit or downplay battles where their side lost, with the Zizhi Tongjian stating that the initial invasion resulted in a base of operations at Maeso fortress, implying that it was captured, whereas the Samguk Sagi makes no such mention. The Samguk Sagi mentions the Battle of Maeso resulting in a Silla victory whereas the Zizhi Tongjian does not mention it. Due to the prior possession of Maeso by the Tang, had combat taken place, it would have involved a numerically inferior Silla force attacking a mountain fortress held by a larger Tang army, which Kim considers unlikely to have occurred. Immediately after the Battle of Maeso, there are records of a combined Tang, Khitan, and Mohe attack on Chiljung Fortress, which Kim interprets as the action of retreating Tang forces. The theory of a Tang retreat from Maeso without any major combat is further supported by the later career of Li Jinxing, who received no significant punishment for the incident and was redeployed to the Tibetan front in the west.

Based on this interpretation of the battle, the success at Maeso was due to the earlier victory by Silla against another Tang force led by Xue Rengui transporting supplies to Li Jinxing. Xue Rengui crossed the Yellow Sea and laid siege to Cheonseong in September 765 but was defeated and fled, resulting in the death of 1,400 Tang soldiers and the capture of 1,000 horses and 40 warships by Silla. Li Jinxing was forced to retreat and reorganize his troops before fighting several battles in northern Gyeonggi, after which they retreated due to the cold weather, ending their campaign in the Maeso region near present-day Yeoncheon.

The Samguk Sagi goes on to state that following the Battle of Maeso, Silla's forces engaged in 18 large and small battles with the Tang and won them all, beheading 6,047 men and capturing 200 horses.
