= Kim Am =

Korean astronomer (fl. 8th century)

- Hangul: 김암
- Hanja: 金巖
- RR: Gim Am
- MR: Kim Am

Kim Am (Korean: 김암; Hanja: 金巖; fl. 8th century) was a late 8th century astronomer, astrologer, military commander, master of yin and yang, and shaman from the kingdom of Silla in Korea favored by Emperor Kōnin (r. 770 to 781) of Nara Japan.

== Biography ==
Kim Am was a grandson of the Sillan general Kim Yu-sin.

Kim Am studied yin-yang in Chang'an, Tang China. He wrote the Daoist text The Principles of Transformation of Substances (Chinese: 遁甲立成之法; Korean pronunciation: Tun'gap ipsŏng pŏp), also translated as Mythical Form of Martial Art or The Principles of Evading Stems. His Theory of Geomancy (Pung-su-sol) is the earliest recorded reference to geology in Korean science. According to a legend in 769, his prayer caused a storm that killed locusts threatening to cause a famine; this suggests he was also seen as a shaman, similar to some other members of his family. He is also said to have been a master of yin-yang.

In Silla, Kim Am was given one or more official positions, whose title, Sachon Paksa, is variously translated as 'Savant of Celestial Pheonomena', 'Achieved Scholar in Astronomy and Science' or 'Great Professor of Astronomy'; with regard to the latter, while there were others professors of astronomy in Korean history of that era, he was the only one to ever have the moniker "Great" added to his title.

In 797, he was appointed as the envoy to the Imperial Court of Yamato, where he is said to have become one of the favorites of the Emperor Kōnin. He may have been the same Kim Am who published a book, Ha-do Keui, about travel to mainland Japan about that time.

He was also a military leader and theorist, commanding the Paegang Garrison (Chinese: 浿江鎭), where he is said to have trained his troops in a "six-column battle formation". He popularized the Six Defense Strategies (Yukchin P'yŏngbŏp).

== See also ==
- Korean shamanism
