= Emperor Kōnin =

Emperor of Japan from 770 to 781

Emperor Kōnin 光仁天皇
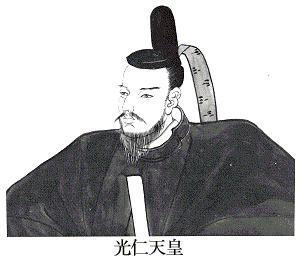

Emperor of Japan
- Reign: 770–781
- Enthronement: October 23, 770
- Predecessor: Kōken (Shōtoku)
- Successor: Kanmu
- Born: Shirakabe (白壁); July 18, 708
- Died: January 11, 782 (aged 73); Heijō-kyō (Nara)
- Burial: Tahara no higashi no misasagi (田原東陵) (Nara)
- Spouse: Inoe
- Issue: Prince Osabe; Princess Sakahito; Prince Hieda; Princess Noto; Emperor Kanmu; Prince Sawara; Princess Minuma
Posthumous name
- Chinese-style shigō: Emperor Kōnin (光仁天皇) Japanese-style shigō: Ametsumune-takatsugi no Sumeramikoto (天宗高紹天皇)
- House: Imperial House of Japan
- Father: Prince Shiki
- Mother: Ki no Tochihime

Emperor Kōnin (光仁天皇, Kōnin-tennō; November 18, 708 – January 11, 782) was the 49th emperor of Japan, according to the traditional order of succession. Kōnin's reign lasted from 770 to 781; he reigned during the Nara period.

== Traditional narrative ==
The personal name of Emperor Kōnin (imina) was Shirakabe (白壁). As a son of Imperial Prince Shiki and a grandson of Emperor Tenji, his formal style was Prince Shirakabe. Initially, he was not in line for succession, as Emperor Tenmu and his branch held the throne.

He married Imperial Princess Inoe, a daughter of Emperor Shōmu, producing a daughter and a son. After his sister-in-law Empress Shōtoku died, he was named her heir. The high courtiers claimed that the empress had left her will in a letter, appointing him as her successor. Prior to this, he had been considered a gentle man without political ambition.

Kōnin had five wives and seven Imperial sons and daughters.

Emperor Kōnin is traditionally venerated at his tomb; the Imperial Household Agency designates Tahara no Higashi no Misasagi (田原東陵, Tahara no Higashi Imperial Mausoleum), in Nara, Nara, as the location of Kōnin's mausoleum.

=== Events of Kōnin's life ===
- September 8, 769 (Jingo-keiun 3, 4th day of the 8th month): In the 5th year of Empress Shōtoku's reign, she died; she is said to have written a letter designating Senior Counselor Prince Shirakabe as her heir and crown prince.
- August 28, 770 (Jingo-keiun 4, 4th day of the 8th month): Exactly one (Japanese era-based) year later, the succession (senso) was received by Kōnin, who was the 62-year-old grandson of Emperor Tenji.
- October 23, 770 (Jingo-keiun 4, 1st day of the 10th month): Emperor Kōnin was said to have acceded to the throne (sokui) in a formal ceremony, following the plans of the nobles and ministers to have him placed on the throne. The era name was also changed on this date, to Hōki.
- 781 (Ten'ō 1, 4th month): The emperor abdicated in favor of his son Yamabe, who became Emperor Kanmu. Emperor Kōnin's reign had lasted for 11 years.
- 781 (Ten'ō 1, 12th month): Kōnin died at the age of 73.

=== Eras of Kōnin's reign ===
The years of Kammu's reign are more specifically identified by more than one era name (nengō).

- Hōki (770–781)
- Ten'ō (781–782)

== Legacy ==
Kōnin attempted to reconstruct the state finance and administrative organizations, which had been corrupted under the reign of Empress Kōken.

== Political conflict around his successors ==
Soon after his enthronement in 770 (Hōki 1), he promoted his wife Imperial Princess Inoe (or Inoue or Ikami, the exact pronunciation of her name is unknown) to the empress and appointed her son Imperial Prince Osabe to the crown prince in the next year. As a grandson of Emperor Shōmu by his mother, Osabe was one of few descendants of Emperor Tenmu, the line of Tenmu however didn't succeed to the throne finally. In 772 Osabe was deprived of his crown prince rank and Imperial Prince Yamabe, an issue by another woman, later Emperor Kanmu was named heir.

According to the Shoku Nihongi (続日本紀), the replacement happened as follows: in the third month of Hōki 3 (772), Inoe was accused of cursing her husband, and Emperor Kōnin stripped her of the rank of Empress. In the fifth month of this year, his son, Osabe, was deprived of his status as crown prince. In Hōki 4 (773), both were alleged to have murdered Imperial Princess Naniwa, a sister of Kōnin, by cursing. This allegation resulted in both being stripped of their royal rank. Those two were together enclosed in a house in Yamato Province and died two years later on the same day, on the 27th day of the fourth month of Hōki 6 (on the Julian Calendar, on May 29, 775).

In 772, soon after Osabe's deprivation of heir right, Prince Yamabe was named heir. His mother Takano no Niigasa, née Yamato no Niigasa, was a descendant of Muryeong, king of Baekje (r. 501-523). Since her clan had then no political power, his appointment had not been likely to happen without the deprivation of Osabe, the noblest male issue of Konin as the son of an Imperial Princess and Empress.

Today, it is pointed out that the accusations against Inoe and Osabe were likely plotted to deprive her son of the throne, and that likely Fujiwara no Momokawa assassinated them.

The late years of Kōnin's reign and the early years of Kanmu's reign were marked by disasters. The people took those disasters as vengeance of noble victims of political conflicts, including late Inoe and Osabe. In 800, during the reign of Kanmu, Princess Inoe, who had died in 775, was restored to the rank of Empress of Kōnin. Several shrines and temples were also founded for redemption, including Kamigoryō Shrine (ja:上御霊神社). He favored Kim Am, a man from the kingdom of Silla.

== Kugyō ==
Kugyō (公卿) is a collective term for the very few most powerful men attached to the court of the Emperor of Japan before the Meiji era.

In general, this elite group included only three to four men at a time. These were hereditary courtiers whose experience and background would have brought them to the pinnacle of their careers. During Kōnin's reign, this apex of the Daijō-kan included:

- Minister of the Left, Fujiwara no Nagate (藤原永手) (714–771), 766–771.
- Minister of the Left, Fujiwara no Uona (藤原魚名) (721–783), 781–782.
- Minister of the Right, Ōnakatomi Kiyomaro (大中臣清麿) (702–788), 771–781.
- Minister of the Right, Fujiwara no Yoshitsugu (藤原良継) (716–777), 771–777.
- Minister of the Right, Fujiwara no Uona (藤原魚名) (721–783), 778–781
- Dainagon, Fun'ya no Ōchi (文室大市) (704–780), 771–777
- Dainagon, Fujiwara no Uona (藤原魚名) (721–783), 771–778
- Counselor (参議, sangi), Fujiwara no Momokawa (藤原百川), 732–779.

== Consorts and children ==
Empress (deposed in 772): Imperial Princess Inoe/Ikami (井上内親王), Emperor Shōmu’s daughter

- Imperial Prince Osabe (他戸親王, 761–775), the Crown Prince (deposed in 772)
- Imperial Princess Sakahito (酒人内親王), Saiō in Ise Shrine 772–775, and married to Emperor Kanmu

Hi: Princess Owari (尾張女王, d. 804), Prince Yuhara’s daughter (son of Prince Shiki)

- Third Son: Imperial Prince Hieda (稗田親王, 751–781)

Bunin: Takano no Niigasa (高野新笠), Yamato no Ototsugu’s daughter

- First Daughter: Imperial Princess Noto (能登内親王, 733–781), married to Prince Ichihara
- First Son: Imperial Prince Yamabe (山部親王) later Emperor Kanmu
- Second Son: Imperial Prince Sawara (早良親王), the Crown Prince (deposed in 785)

Bunin: Fujiwara no Sōshi (藤原曹子), Fujiwara no Nagate’s daughter

Bunin: Ki no Miyako (紀宮子), Ki no Ineko’s daughter

Bunin: Fujiwara no Nariko (藤原産子), Fujiwara no Momokawa’s daughter

Court lady: Agatanushi no Shimahime (県主嶋姫), Agatanushi no Emishi’s daughter

- Imperial Princess Minuma (弥努摩内親王, d. 810), married to Prince Miwa (神王)

Court lady (Nyoju): Agatainukai no Isamimi (Omimi) (県犬養勇耳/男耳)

- Hirone no Morokatsu (広根諸勝), removed from the Imperial Family by receiving the family name from Emperor (Shisei Kōka賜姓降下) in 787

Unknown Woman:

- Prince Kaisei (開成皇子, 724–781)

== Ancestry ==
Ancestors of Emperor Kōnin

8. Emperor Jomei (593–641)
4. Emperor Tenji (626–672)
9. Empress Kōgyoku/Empress Saimei (594–661)
2. Prince Shiki (d. 716)
10. Koshi-no-Michi
5. Koshi-no-michi no Iratsume
1. Emperor Kōnin
6. Ki no Morohito
3. Ki no Tochihime (d. 709)
7. Michi

== See also ==
- Emperor of Japan
- List of Emperors of Japan
- Imperial cult
- The Emperor's Birthday

Regnal titles
Preceded by Empress Shōtoku	Emperor of Japan: Kōnin; 770–781	Succeeded by Emperor Kanmu
