= Tomb of Kim Yu-sin =

Tomb in Gyeongju, South Korea

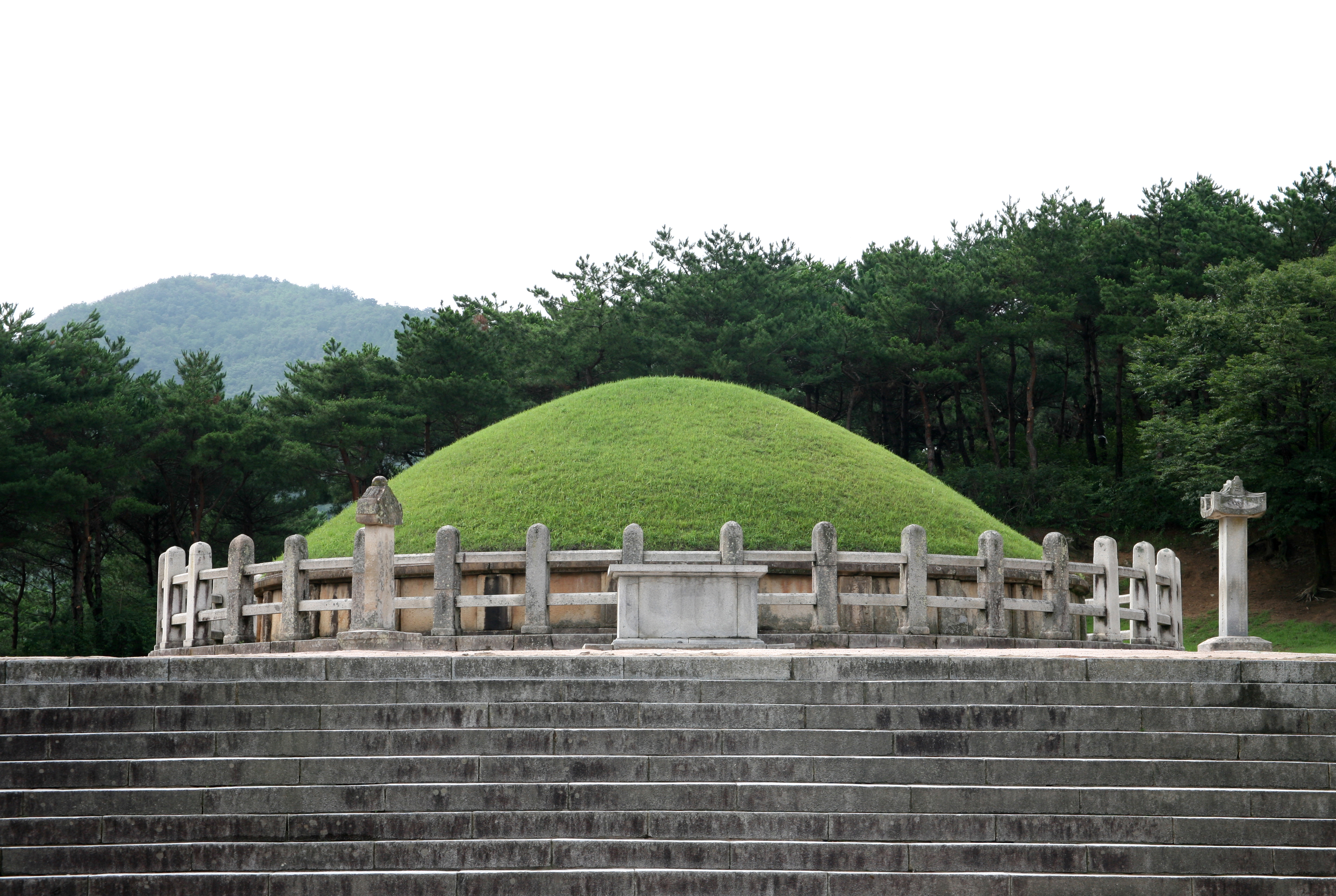
- The tomb
- Interactive map of Tomb of Kim Yu-sin
- Location: Gyeongju, South Korea
- Coordinates: 35°50′44″N 129°11′19″E
- Built: 7th century
- Built for: Kim Yu-sin (believed to be)

Historic Sites of South Korea
- Designated: 1963-01-21
- Reference no.: 21

The Tomb of Kim Yu-sin (Korean: 김유신묘; Hanja: 金庾信墓) is a tumulus tomb believed to belong to Silla general Kim Yu-sin (595–673) located in Chunghyo-dong, Gyeongju, South Korea. The tomb's actual owner is disputed in academia, with some arguing it belongs to King Sinmu. On January 21, 1963, it was made Historic Site of South Korea No. 21.

The tomb's construction is mentioned in the history texts Samguk yusa and Samguk sagi.

It has a diameter of 30 m (98 ft). It is surrounded by relief carvings of animals of the zodiac. It has a stone monument erected in 1710. Stone railing surround the tomb.
