= Jincheon Gilsangsa =

Shrine in Jincheon, South Korea

Coordinates: 36°51′12″N 127°25′23″E

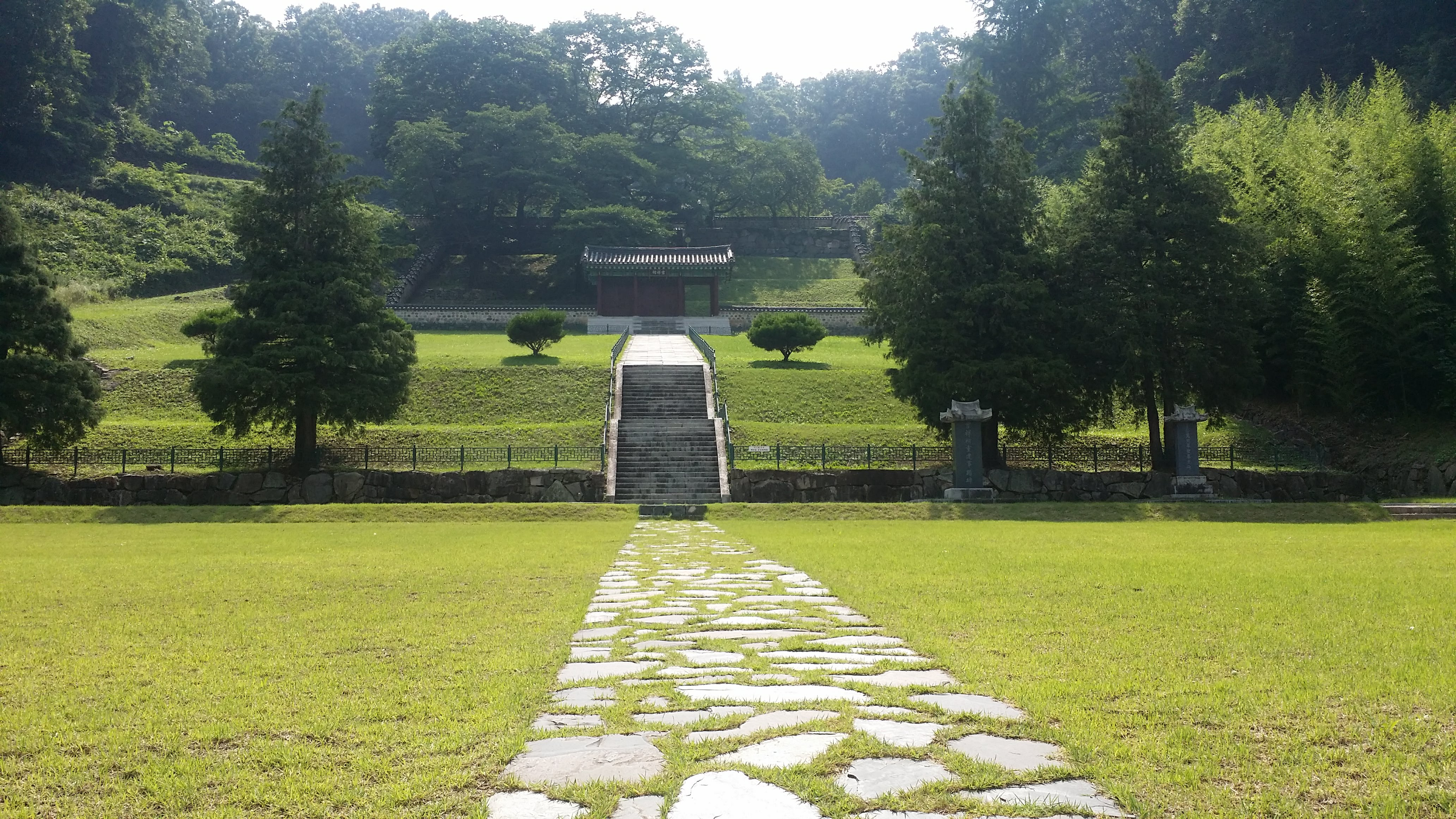
View of Jincheon Gilsangsa

Jincheon Gilsangsa (Korean: 진천 길상사; Hanja: 鎭川吉祥祠; lit. Shrine to the Lucky Omen of Jincheon) is a shrine dedicated to the general Kim Yu-sin (595–673) located in Jincheon-eup, Jincheon County, North Chungcheong Province, South Korea.

Kim was the leading figure in the unification of the three kingdoms of Goguryeo, Baekje, and Silla. The shrine was designated as the first monument in the province on 21 February 1975.

== History ==
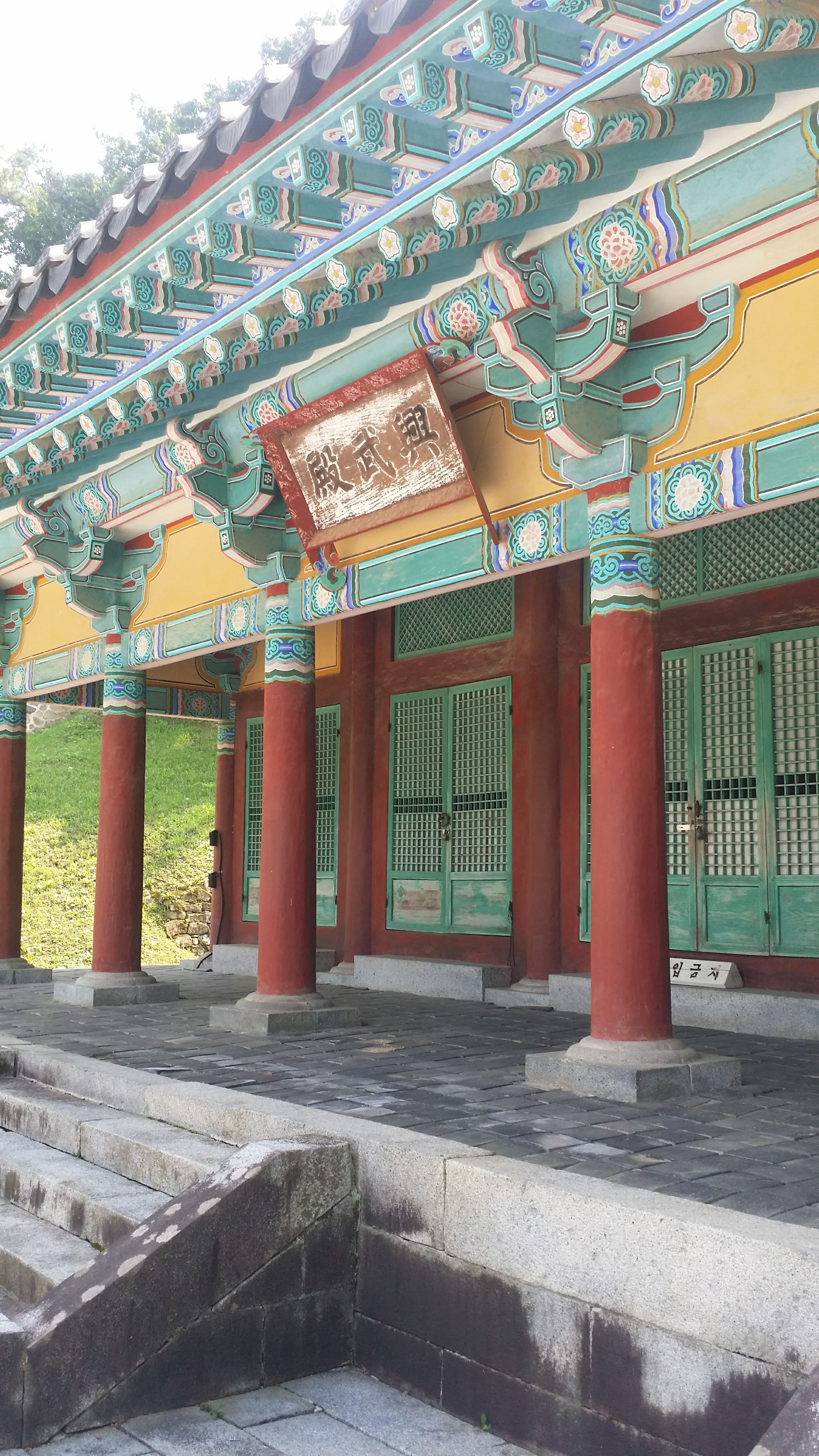
Heungmujeon, the main hall of Jincheon Gilsangsa

Gilsangsa, or Shrine Gilsang, was built under the mountain Taeryeongsan (태령산; 胎靈山) where the tae (태; 胎; refers to tissues such as placenta or umbilical cord) of General Kim Yu-sin was buried. Ever since the Silla period, memorial services were held there by the national government. Since the reign of Taejong of Joseon, they were also held by the local government. The shrine fell into ruin during the Japanese and Qing invasions.

In 1851, a shrine named Jukgyesa (죽계사; 竹溪祠) was built in the village of Gaejuk, Gusu-ri, Baekgok-myeon. However, it was demolished in 1864. Afterwards, in 1866, the shrine Seobalhansadang (서발한사당; 舒發翰祠堂) was built under the mountain fortress Dodangsanseong (도당산성; 都堂山城). A spirit tablet called Gyeyangmyo (계양묘; 桂陽廟) was placed there. The shrine collapsed in 1922 due to a great flood. In 1926, through the efforts of Kim Man-hui (김만희), the descendant of the general Kim Yu-sin, the shrine was reestablished in its final location with its current name. The name came from the mountain Taeryeongsan's previous name of Gilsangsan.

Gilsangsa was severely damaged during the 1950–1953 Korean War, but was reconstructed in 1959. Finally, it was completely rebuilt in 1975 as part of the historic sites managing project (사적지 정화사업) and since then remains open to visitors.

== Structure ==
The main hall is called Heungmujeon (흥무전; 興武殿; lit. Hall of Heungmu). It is a concrete-tiled roof consisting of five compartments in the front and two compartments in side. A portrait of Kim Yu-sin is enshrined inside. Also inside is the Shinseong Monument of the Great King Heungmu (흥무대왕신성비; 興武大王神聖碑), built in 1957 in the outer side of the main hall. The memorial stone of General Kim Yu-sin (김유신장군사적비; 金庾信將軍事蹟碑) was built in 1976 in the inner courtyard. A memorial to the rebuilding of Jincheon Gilsangsa was built in 1976 at the entrance.
