= Princess Inoe =

Inoe
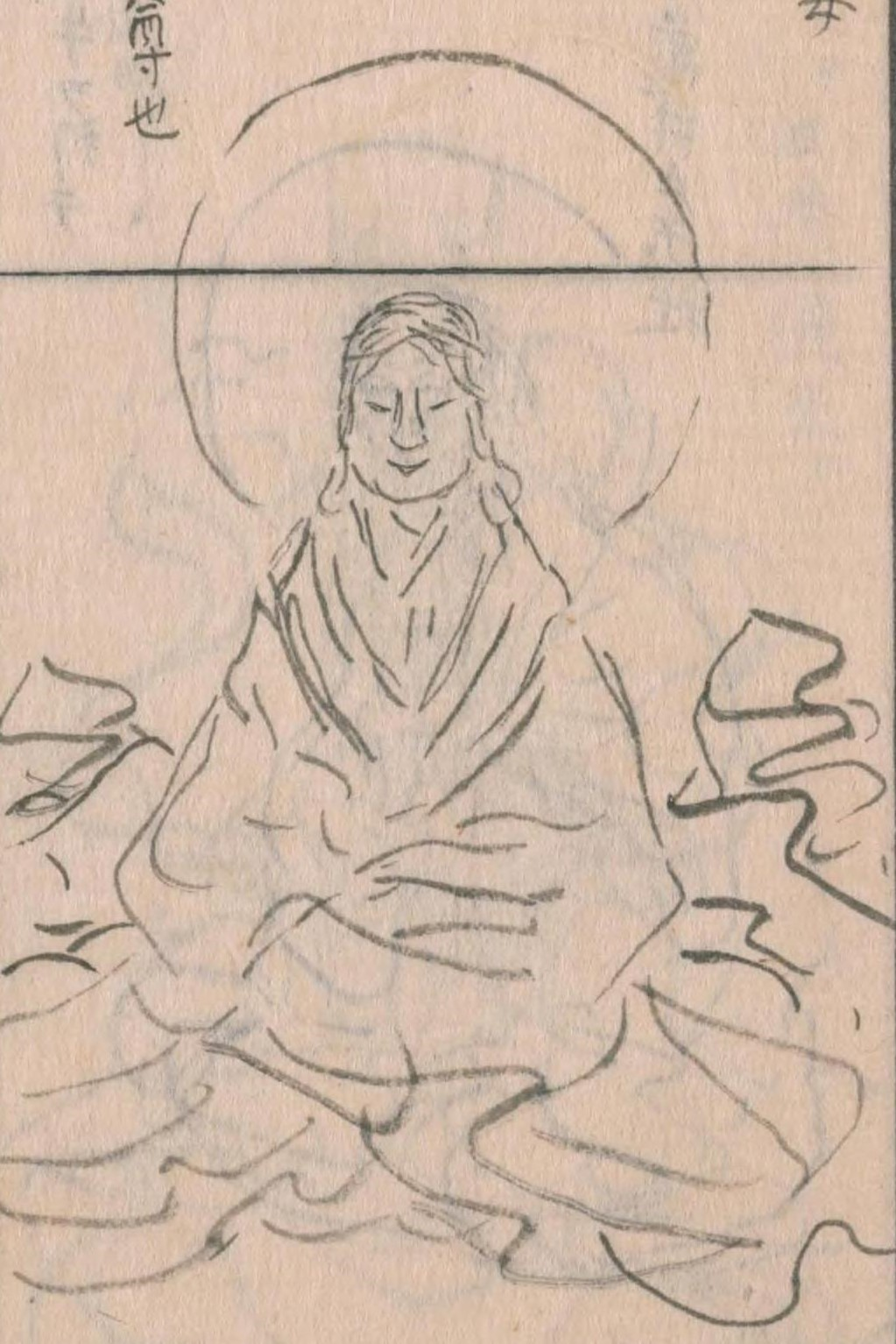

Empress consort of Japan
- Tenure: 770 – 772
- Born: 717
- Died: 775 (aged 57–58)
- Spouse: Emperor Kōnin
- Issue: Imperial Prince Osabe; Princess Sakahito
- House: Imperial House of Japan
- Father: Emperor Shōmu
- Mother: Agatainukai no Hirotoji

Princess Inoe or Inoue (717–775) was the empress consort of Emperor Kōnin of Japan. She was deposed in 772, accused of witchcraft.

== Biography ==
Inoue was the daughter of Emperor Shōmu, who reigned from March 3, 724 until August 19, 749. Her mother was Agatainukai no Hirotoji (県犬養広刀自), daughter of Agatainukai no Morokoshi. She was the sister of Prince Asaka (d. 744) and Princess Fuwa, and the half sister of Empress Kōken.

Princess Inoue married her relative, the future Emperor Kōnin, thereby uniting the Tenmu and Tenji line of the Imperial House. During the last reign of her half sister Empress Kōken (764-770), Inoue and her sister Fuwa where both involved in political plots with ambition to the succession of the throne: Fuwa wished to place her husband and sons on the throne, while Inoue wished to have her son Osabe appointed Crown Prince.

In 770, Inoue's spouse succeeded her half sister to the throne due to a fabricated will, after which Inoue was named Empress and her son named Crown Prince. In 772, Empress Inoue was suddenly deposed and arrested and accused for having used curses and black magic to promote her son to the throne, and shortly afterward, her son Prince Osabe was also arrested for complicity. Both Inoue and Osabe was stripped of their titles, banished and imprisoned in house arrest, for having performed curses and practising black magic. In 775, Inoue and her son both died in custody on the same day, presumably poisoned.

When the Emperor fell ill in 777, Inoue was believed to haunt him, and consequently, she was reinterred in an Imperial grave and rehabilitated; in 800, she was given back her title of Empress posthumously.

== Issue ==
- Imperial Prince Osabe (d. 775), the Crown Prince
- Princess Sakahito married her elder half-brother Yamabe, later Kanmu after the deaths of her mother and Osabe in 775.

== Legacy ==
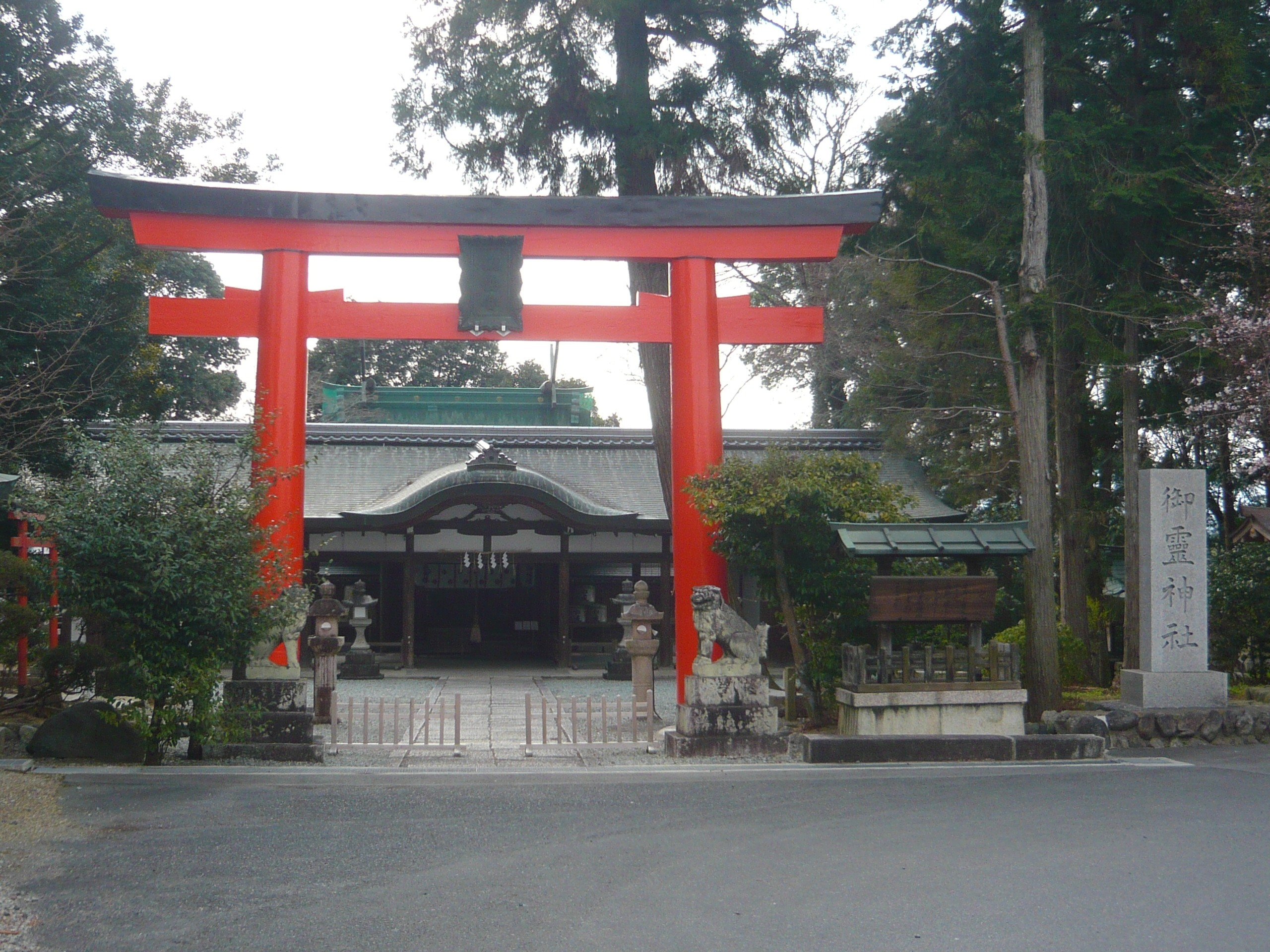
Goryō Jinja in Gojō, Nara

Around 800, during the reign of Kammu, former Prince Yamabe, a shrine was built for her in Yamashiro Province (now Gojō, Nara), named Goryō Jinja. Princess Inoe is also venerated at its subsideries.

== Notes ==
Japanese royalty
Preceded by Fujiwara Asukabehime	Empress consort of Japan; 770–772	Succeeded by Fujiwara no Otomuro
