= Kim Yu-sin =

Silla-era Korean general (595–673)

Kim Yushin
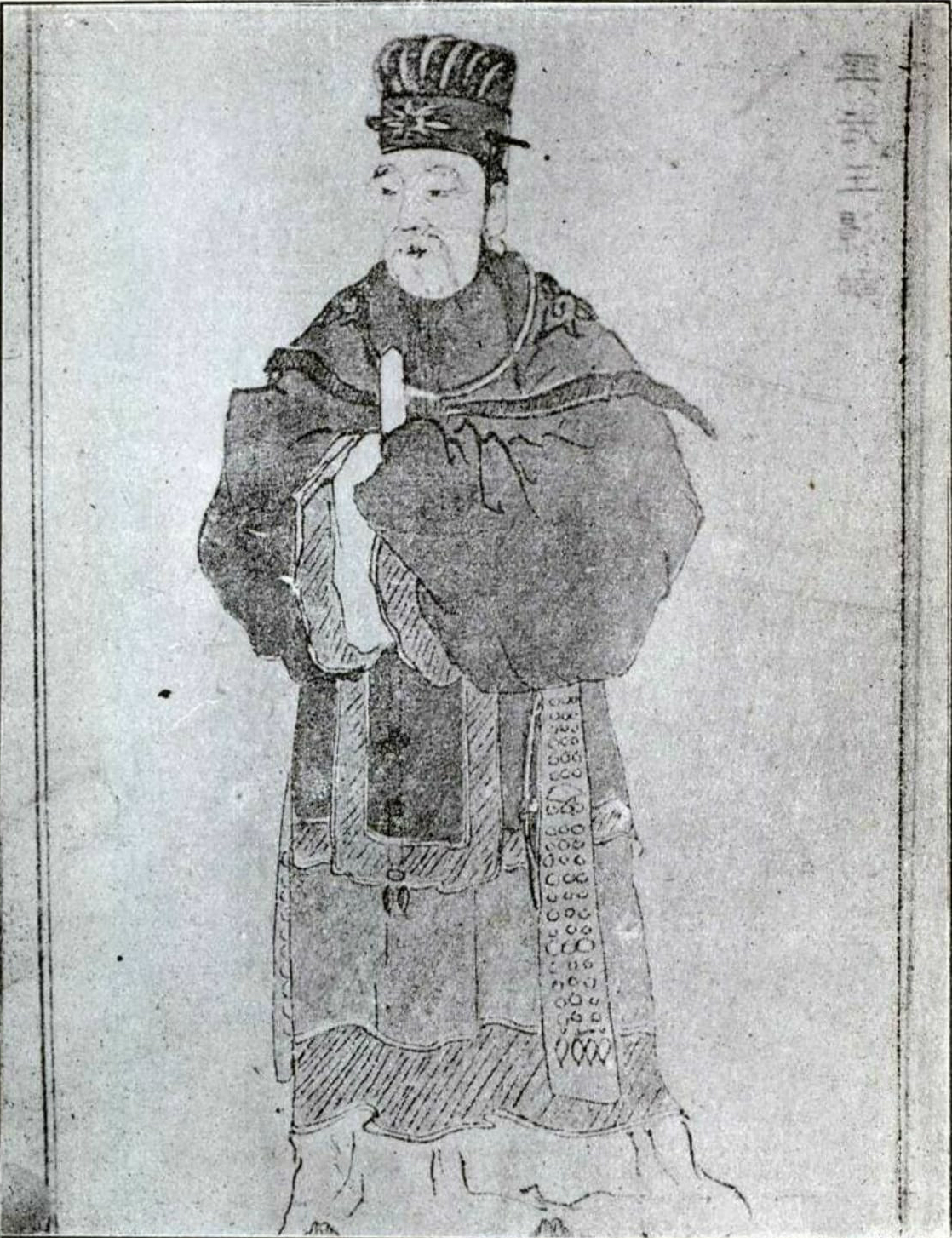
- Portrait of Kim Yu-sin in the "famous portrait photo book of Joseon" published in 1926
- Born: 595; Manno, Silla (present-day Jincheon County, South Korea)
- Died: 21 August 673
- Burial place: Tomb of Kim Yu-sin (believed), Gyeongju, South Korea
- Other name: King Heungmu
- Spouse: Lady Jiso
- Children: 10, including Kim Won-sul

Korean name
- Hangul: 김유신
- Hanja: 金庾信
- RR: Gim Yusin
- MR: Kim Yusin

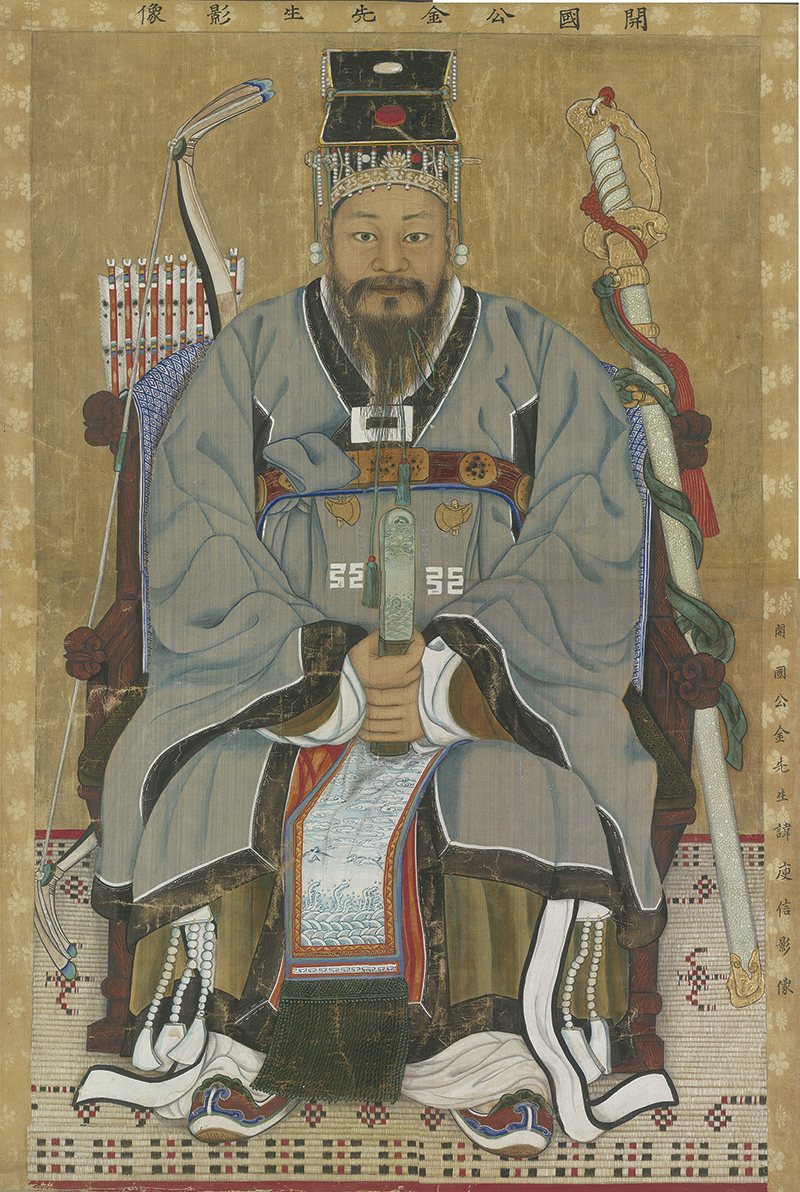
Portrait of Kim Yu-sin at Namak Seowon, Jinju

Kim Yu-sin (Korean: 김유신; Hanja: 金庾信; 595 – 21 August 673) was a Korean military general and politician in 7th-century Silla. He led the unification of the Korean Peninsula by Silla under the reign of King Muyeol and King Munmu. He is said to have been the great-grandchild of King Guhae of Geumgwan Gaya, the last ruler of the Geumgwan Gaya state. This would have given him a very high position in the Silla bone rank system, which governed the political and military status that a person could attain.

Much of what is known about Kim's life comes from the detailed account in the Samguk Sagi, Yeoljeon 1-3, and the much briefer record in the Samguk Yusa, vol. 1.

== Early years ==
Kim Yu-sin was the son of General Kim Seohyeon (the second son of General Kim Mu-ryeok) and Lady Manmyeong, who was a daughter of Kim Sukheuljong (Korean: 김숙흘종; Hanja: 金肅訖宗), who was the younger brother of King Jinheung. He was born in Manno county (만노군; 萬弩郡; present-day Jincheon County) in 595, became a Hwarang warrior at just 15 and was an accomplished swordsman and a Gukseon (Korean: 국선; Hanja: 國仙; Hwarang leader) by the time he was 18 years old. By the age of 34 (in 629) he had been given total command of the Silla armed forces. Three years later, Kim Yu-sin's cousin, Princess Deokman, became Queen Seondeok and kept Kim Yu-sin as commander in chief of the royal army. During the reign of Queen Seondeok of Silla (632–647), Kim Yu-sin owned ten thousand private soldiers, won many battles against Baekje and became one of the most powerful men in Silla.

== Military accomplishments ==
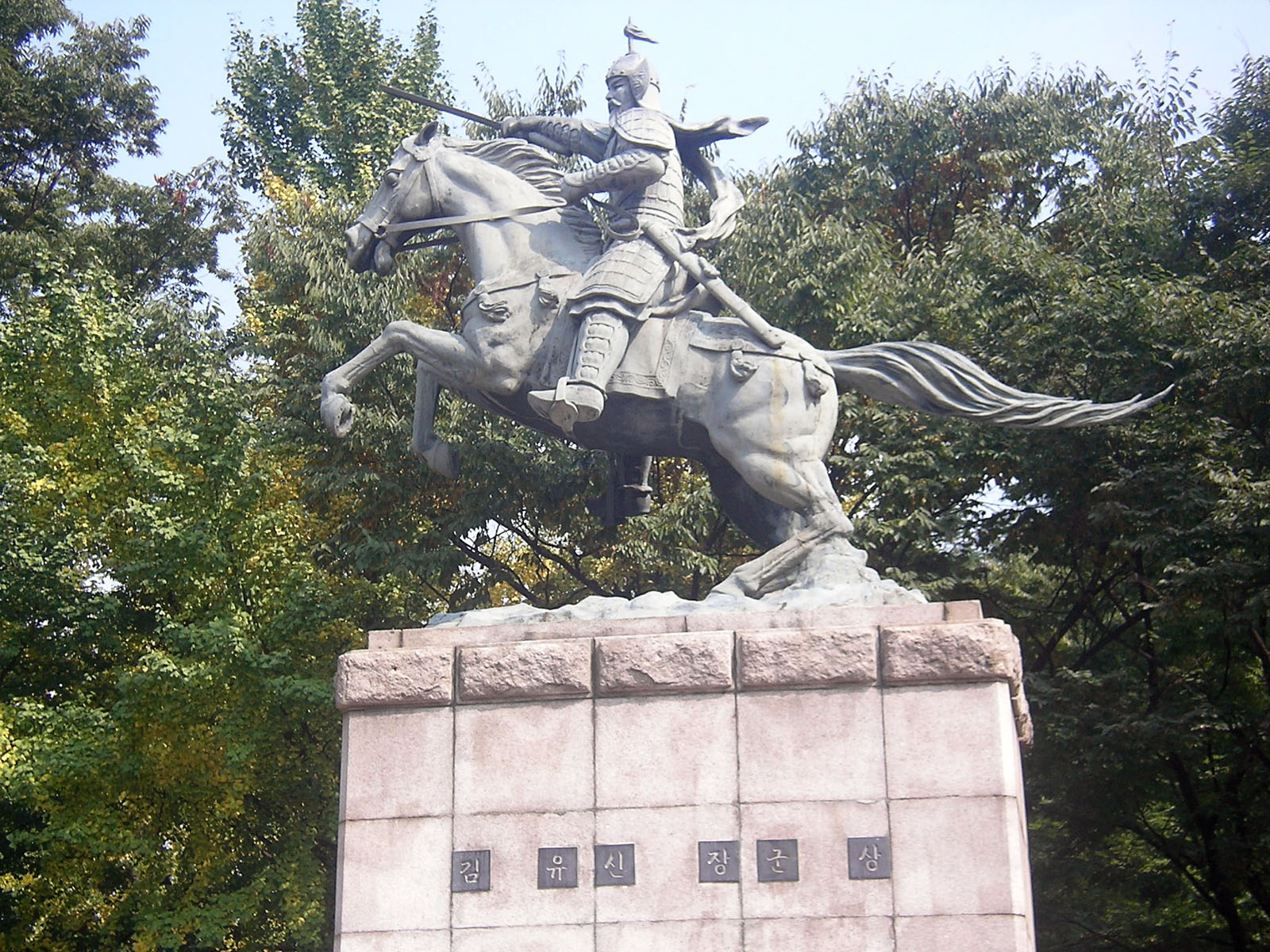
His statue in Namsan Park, Seoul, South Korea

Kim Yu-sin's first military engagement in command is believed to have occurred around 629 AD, and through it he quickly proved his capabilities as a warrior. Silla was in a constant struggle with its neighbor to the west, Baekje, over territory. There had been gains and losses on both sides, and the struggle lasted for many years. It was during this period that Yu-sin rose through the ranks of the military, rising to the position of general and becoming a skilled field commander.

Baekje and Silla had formed an alliance to counter Goguryeo's power and its intentions to push southwards, and together they launched a successful attack on it, Silla taking the northern territory and Baekje the one south of the Han river. But Silla broke the alliance and attacked Baekje in order to claim both territories for itself. After this betrayal, Baekje allied with Goguryeo. When Goguryeo and Baekje attacked Silla in 655, Silla joined forces with Tang dynasty China to battle the invaders. Although it is not clear when Kim Yu-sin first became a general, he was certainly commanding the Silla forces by this time. Eventually, with the help of a 50,000 man Silla army and some 130,000 Tang forces, Yushin attacked the Baekje capital, Sabi, in 660, in the Battle of Hwangsanbeol.

The Baekje defenders were commanded by General Gyebaek, but the Baekje forces only consisted of about 5,000 men and were no match for Yu-sin's warriors, which numbered about ten times as many. Baekje, which had already been experiencing internal political problems, crumbled. Kim Yu-sin's Silla forces and their Tang allies now moved on Goguryeo from two directions, and in 661 they attacked the seemingly impregnable Goguryeo kingdom, but were repelled. The attack had weakened Goguryeo, though. In 667 another offensive was launched which, in 668, finally destroyed Goguryeo.

Silla still had to subdue various pockets of resistance, but their efforts were then focused on ensuring that their Tang allies did not overstay their welcome on the peninsula. After some difficult conflicts, Silla eventually forced out the Tang troops and united the peninsula under their rule.

== Legends ==
Many legends exist about Kim Yu-sin. One legend states that Kim was once ordered to subdue a rebel army, but his troops refused to fight as they had seen a large star fall from the sky and took this to be a bad omen. To regain the confidence of his troops, the General used a large kite to carry a fire ball into the sky. The soldiers, seeing the star return to heaven, rallied and defeated the rebels. Other legends mention how General Kim ingeniously used kites as a means of communication between his troops when they had become divided between islands and the mainland.

Kim Yu-sin once spent the night at a courtesan's tavern, and when his mother learned of this, she cried and asked Kim Yu-sin to never again set his foot in that kind of place. One night, Kim Yu-sin was very drunk, and his horse took him to the courtesan's house. When Kim Yu-sin woke, he was angry at having broken his promise to his mother and slit the horse's throat.

== His final years ==
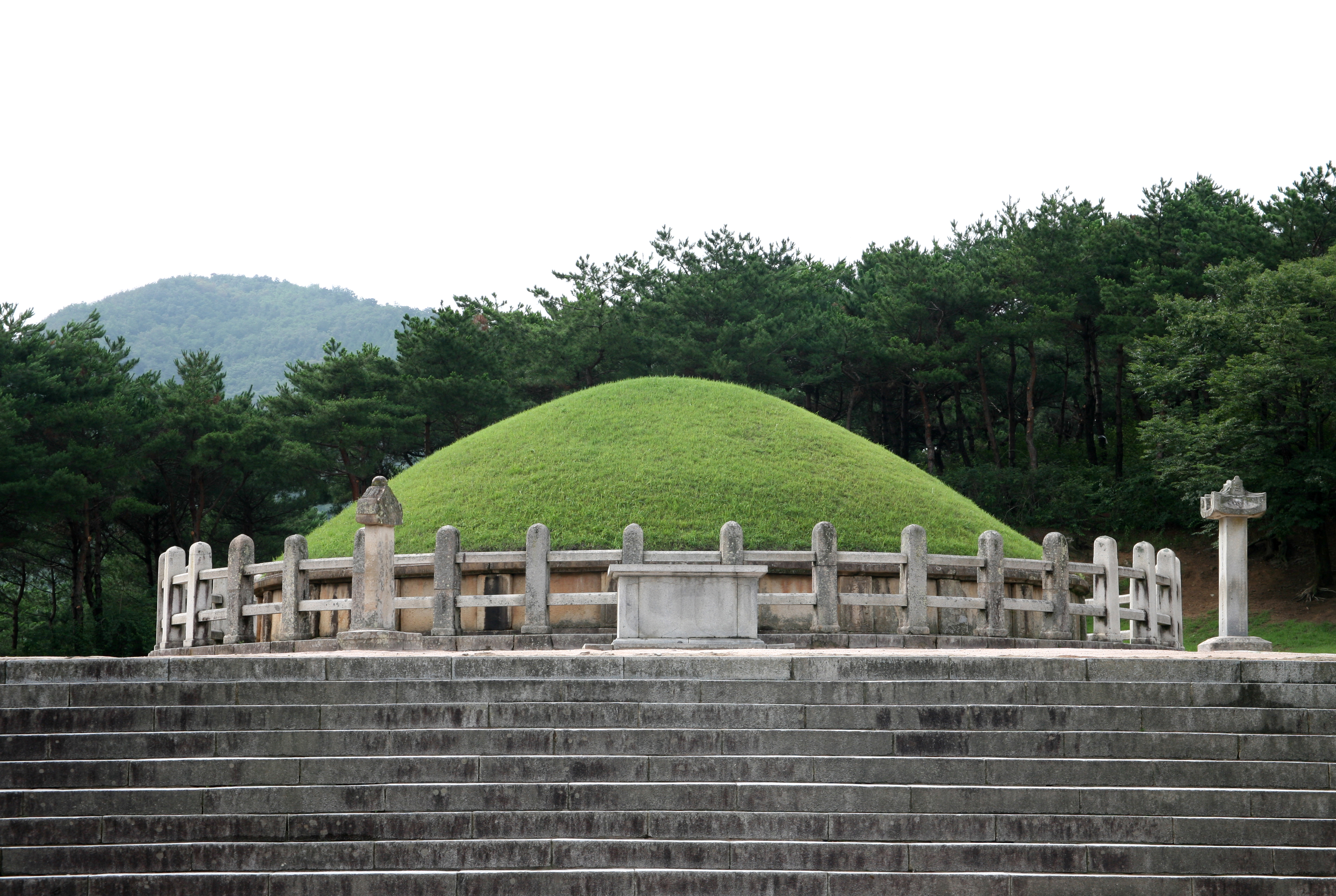
Tomb that is believed to belong to Kim

Throughout his life, Kim Yu-sin felt that Baekje, Goguryeo, and Silla should not be separate countries but rather united as one. He is regarded as the driving force in the unification of the Korean Peninsula, and is the most famous of all the generals in the unification wars of the Three Kingdoms.

Kim Yu-sin was rewarded handsomely for his efforts in the campaigns. In 668, King Munmu bestowed upon him the honorary title of Taedaegakgan (태대각간; 太大角干), something like "Supreme Herald of Defense" (literally "greatest-great-trumpet-shield"). He reportedly received a village of over 500 households, and in 669 was given some 142 separate horse farms, spread throughout the kingdom. He died four years later, leaving behind ten children.

Kim Yu-sin lived to the age of 79 and is considered to be one of the most famous generals and masters of Korean swords in Korean history. He is the focus of numerous stories and legends, and is familiar to most Koreans from a very early age. Following his death on 21 August (the 1st day of the 7th lunar month) 673, General Kim was awarded the honorary title of King Heungmu.

A tomb in Gyeongju is believed to belong to Kim, although its owner is debated by academics.

== Family ==
Kim Yu-sin had two sisters, Kim Bo-hee and Kim Mun-hee. Kim Mun-hee, later known as Queen Munmyeong, married Yu-sin's friend Kim Cheon-chu, King Taejong Muyeol of Silla, who is credited for having led the unification of the Korean peninsula under Silla. Muyeol and Munmyeong were the parents of King Munmu of Silla and Kim Inmun.

Kim Yu-sin's third wife, Lady Jiso (Hanja: 智炤夫人), was the third daughter of King Muyeol of Silla. Yu-sin had ten children. His second son, Kim Won-sul, would later play a central role in completing the independence of Silla from the Tang dynasty.

- Wife: Lady Jiso, daughter of King Muyeol of Silla and Queen Munmyeong
  - Son: Kim Sam-gwang (김삼광)
  - Son: Kim Won-sul
  - Son: Kim Won-jeong (김원정)
  - Son: Kim Jang-yi (김장이)
  - Son: Kim Won-mang (김원망)
  - Daughter: Lady Kim of the Gimhae Kim clan (김해 김씨)
  - Daughter: Lady Kim of the Gimhae Kim clan (김해 김씨)
  - Daughter: Lady Kim of the Gimhae Kim clan (김해 김씨)
  - Daughter: Lady Kim of the Gimhae Kim clan (김해 김씨)
- Wife: Cheon Gwan-nyeo – Courtesan
  - Son: Kim Gun-seung (김군승) or Kim Si-deuk (김시득)
- Grandson: Kim Am (also Gim Am, Korean: 김암)

== Legacy ==
According to the Samguk sagi, Kim Yu-sin and his clan were called "Kim/Gold (金)" due to the heavens bestowing them a gold chest. (Note: Chinese Wikisource has original text related to this article: 三國史記/卷28『三國史記』卷二十八：百濟本紀 第六 論曰：《新羅古事》云：「天降金樻，故姓金氏。」其言可怪。) In another account, it also states that he was a descendant of the god Shaohao. (Note: Chinese Wikisource has original text related to this article: 三國史記/卷41『三國史記』列傳 第一：金庾信 上 金庾信 王京人也 十二世祖首露 不知何許人也 以後漢建武十八年壬寅 登龜峯 望駕洛九村 遂至其地 開國 號曰加耶 後改爲金官國 其子孫相承 至九世孫仇亥 或云仇次休 於庾信爲曾祖 羅人自謂少昊金天氏之後 故姓金 庾信碑亦云 軒轅之裔 少昊之胤 則南加耶始祖首露 與新羅同姓也) However, the author of Samguk sagi, Kim Pusik stated that he was only adding it as a sidenote (Note: Chinese Wikisource has original text related to this article: 三國史記/卷28『三國史記』卷二十八：百濟本紀 第六 其言可怪而不可信，臣修史，以其傳之舊，不得刪落其辭。) as much of these legends are considered as an attempt of aggrandization on the basis of claiming favoritism from the heavens or being a descendent of a god. In actuality, Kim Yu-sin and his clan descend from King Suro and Queen Heo Hwang-ok, a supposed Indian princess. However, her unique background is also believed to be an embellishment similar to the claim surrounding Kim and the heavens or Shaohao as it was a common practice in pre-modern history.

Today, Kim Yu-sin is remembered by Koreans as one of the greatest generals in Korean history. His ultimate legacy is the first unification of the Korean nation. One of his ten children, his second son Kim Won-sul, became a general during the reign of King Munmu and was essential in unifying Silla.

Jincheon Gilsangsa is a shrine dedicated to his portrait in Jincheon-eup, Jincheon-gun, North Chungcheong Province.

== Popular culture ==
- Portrayed by Yoon Seung-won, Lee Jong-soo and Lee David in 2006–2007 SBS TV series Yeon Gaesomun.
- Portrayed by Uhm Tae-woong and Lee Hyun-woo in the 2009 MBC TV series Queen Seondeok.
- Portrayed by Park Sung-woong in the 2011 MBC TV series Gyebaek and 2026 tv series Sword & Silence
- Portrayed by Kim Yu-seok and Noh Young-hak in the 2012–2013 KBS1 TV series Dream of the Emperor.
- Appeared in a Korean MMORPG Atlantica Online as a playable mercenary character Hwarang.
- Portrayed by Jang Tae Wong in the 2017 KBS TV series Chronicles of Korea.

== Sources ==
- McBride, Richard D., II. “Hidden Agendas in the Life Writings of Kim Yusin.” Acta Koreana 1 (August 1998): 101–142.
- McBride, Richard D., II. “The Structure and Sources of the Biography of Kim Yusin.” Acta Koreana 16, no. 2 (December 2013): 497–535.

== See also ==
- Korean history
- Three Kingdoms of Korea
- Queen Seondeok (TV series)
