= List of Hindu temples in South Korea =

Hinduism (힌두교 Hindugyo) is practiced among South Korea's small Indian and Nepali immigrant community. However, Hindu traditions such as Yoga and Vedanta have attracted interest among young Koreans. Hindu temples in South Korea are mostly concentrated in Gyeonggi Province and the metropolitan city of Seoul. Here is a list of Hindu temples in South Korea:

== Seoul ==
- Sri Radha Shyamasundar Mandir
- Sri Lakshmi Narayanan Temple, Seoul
- Himalayan Meditation and Yoga Sadhana Mandir, Seocho, Seoul

== See also ==
- Buddhism in Korea
- Hinduism in Korea
- Indians in Korea
- Koreans in India
- Memorial of Heo Hwang-ok, Ayodhya
- India–South Korea relations
- India – North Korea relations
- List of Hindu temples outside India
