= Sri Radha Shyamasundar Mandir =

Sri Radha Shyamasundar Mandir is a Hindu temple located in Haebangchon, Seoul, South Korea. The temple opens each morning and evening at specific darshan times. Special programs are also held on Sundays, such as free children's Bal Vikas classes (which includes Indian scriptures taught through videos, Hindi language, Indian devotional music, etc), yoga classes, and a special Sunday feast program with Bhagavad Gita lectures.

The temple holds festivals like Diwali and Sri Krishna Janmastami, which have attracted more than 500 devotees. Ceremonies such as weddings, Namkaran naming ceremonies and Shnathi Puja are held in Vedic style by traditional Brahmins. The temple also is a meeting point for Hindus from India, Nepal, Bangladesh, Sri Lanka and Pakistan, as well as ISKCON devotees from various parts of the world.

The temple also provides vegetarian groceries, Puja items, Upawas and satwik foods (purely vegetarian, without garlic or onion) on special request for vegetarian devotees due to language difficulties and dietary restrictions.

== Description ==
The Vedic Cultural Center (Sri Radha Shyamasundar Mandir) serves as a spiritual university and spiritual hospital and place for peace and tranquility. According to temple officials, it serves as a place to unwind from the stresses of a modern economy. The temple officials state that such questions as, "Why do bad things happening to good people? What is purpose of life? Where can I find true happiness in life that can fulfill the innermost longings of life?" are questions that they try to answer through interpretation of Vedic texts.

The temple conducts most Hindu religious practices, such as Mangal Aarti, Sandhya Aarti, Bhajan singing, Dancing, Group Japa Meditation, Bhagavatam and Bhagavad Gita classes, and spiritual discourses.

In 2008, some devotees of Krishna inspired by the teachings of A. C. Bhaktivedant Swami Srila Prabhupad, decided to spread this gift of ancient Sanatana (Hindu) Dharma outside Seoul.

== See also ==
- Buddhism in Korea
- Hinduism in Korea
- Indians in Korea
- Koreans in India
- Korean Shamanism
- Memorial of Heo Hwang-ok, Ayodhya
- India–South Korea relations
- India – North Korea relations
- List of Hindu temples in South Korea
- List of Hindu temples outside India
- Silk Road transmission of Buddhism
