= Korean Indian =

Korean Indian may refer to:

- Koreans in India
- Indians in Korea

== See also ==
- India–North Korea relations
- India–South Korea relations
