= Heo =

Korean family name

- Hangul: 허
- Hanja: 許
- RR: Heo
- MR: Hŏ

Heo is a family name in Korea.

It is also often spelled as Huh or Hur, or less commonly as Her or Hue. In South Korea in 1985, out of a population of between roughly 40 and 45 million, there were approximately 264,000 people surnamed Heo. The name is also found in North Korea. The character used for the name (許) means to permit or advocate.

The Heos traditionally trace their ancestry to Queen Heo Hwang-ok, the wife of King Suro of Geumgwan Gaya, one of ancient kingdoms in Korea. Her native kingdom is believed to be located in India. She bore ten sons, two of whom retained the Queen's name. The Heos are traditionally considered distant kins of the Gimhae Kim clan, who trace their ancestry to the other sons of King Suro.

== Clans ==
As with most other Korean family names, there are many Heo clans, including the Gimhae clan and the Yangchon clan. Each clan consists of individual Heo families. Even within each clan, people in different families are not necessarily related to each other. These distinctions are important, since Korean law used to prohibit intermarriage in the same clan, no matter how remote the relationship; now, however, only those in a relationship of second cousins or closer may not marry.

As with other Korean family names, the Heo clans are distinguished by the place from which they claim to originate.

- Yangcheon Heo clan
- Hayang Heo clan
- Gimhae Heo clan
- Taein Heo clan
- Hamchang clan
- Suwon clan
- Yangju clan

== People with the surname ==
=== Heo ===
- Heo Ga-yoon (born 1990), South Korean singer
- Heo Hoon (born 1995), South Korean professional basketball player
- Heo Hwang-ok (32–189), Queen of Geumgwan Gaya
- Hyun Jin-young (born Heo Hyeon-seok, 1971), South Korean singer
- Heo Im (1570–1647), Joseon-era physician
- Heo Jae-won (born 1984), South Korean football player
- Heo Jang-kang (1925–1975), South Korean actor
- Heo Jeong (1896–1988), South Korean politician and Korean independence activist
- Heo Jun (1539–1615), Joseon-era court physician
- Heo Jun (fencer) (born 1988), South Korean foil fencer
- Heo Jung-eun (born 2007), South Korean actress
- Heo Nam-jun (born 1993), South Korean actor
- Heo Nanseolheon (1563–1589), Joseon-era painter and poet
- Justhis (born Heo Seung, 1991), South Korean rapper
- Heo Sol-ji (born 1989), South Korean singer, member of girl group Exid
- Heo Sung-tae (born 1977), South Korean actor
- Heo Ung (born 1993), South Korean basketball player
- Heo Yi-jae (born 1987), South Korean actress
- Heo Yong-mo (born 1965), South Korean boxer
- Heo Yool (footballer) (born 2001), South Korean professional football player
- Heo Yool (born 2009), South Korean actress
- Heo Young-ho (born 1986), South Korean professional Go player
- Heo Young-ji (born 1994), South Korean singer, member of girl group Kara
- Heo Young-saeng (born 1986), South Korean singer, member of boy band SS501

=== Hŏ ===
- Ho Bong-hak, North Korean general
- Hŏ Chŏk (1610–1680), Joseon politician
- Ho Hon (1885–1951), North Korean politician and Korean independence activist
- Ho Jong-suk (1908–1991), North Korean politician and judge
- Hŏ Kyun (1569–1618), Joseon-era writer

=== Hue ===
- Young Soon Hue (born 1963), South Korean ballet choreographer

=== Huh ===
- Ben Huh (born 1979), South Korean-American internet entrepreneur
- Huh Chan-mi (born 1992), South Korean singer
- Huh Chang-soo (born 1948), South Korean businessman
- Huh Chin-kyu (born 1940), South Korean businessman
- Huh Gak (born 1984), South Korean singer
- John Huh (born 1990), American professional golfer
- Huh Ji-won (born 2000), South Korean singer and actress, former member of girl group Cherry Bullet
- Huh Joon-ho (born 1964), South Korean actor
- Huh Jung-moo (born 1955), South Korean former football player and manager
- Huh Kyung-young (1947), South Korean politician
- Huh Soon-young (born 1975), South Korean handball player
- Huh Young-man (born 1947), South Korean manhwa artist
- Huh Young-sook (born 1975), South Korean handball player
- Huh Yunjin (born 2001), South Korean-American singer, member of girl group Le Sserafim

=== Hur ===
- Anton Hur (born 1981), South Korean writer and translator
- Aram Hur (born 1971), South Korean educator
- Hur Hyun-jun (born 2000), South Korean singer and actor
- Hur Jae (born 1965), South Korean retired basketball coach and former player
- Hur Jin-ho (born 1963), South Korean film director
- M. J. Hur (born 1989), South Korean professional golfer
- Hur Nam-sik (born 1949), South Korean politician
- Robert K. Hur (born 1973), American attorney
- Hur Seung-Wook (born 1972), South Korean alpine skier
- Hur Suk-ho (born 1973), South Korean professional golfer

== See also ==
- List of Korean family names
- Korean culture
- Xǔ (surname), where the Hanja character came from.
