= Koreans in Varanasi =

Ethnic group in Varanasi, India

Koreans initially began to migrate to India during the early 1950s. The Korean Association of India was established at that time by a trio of South Koreans who went into exile after their release from imprisonment in their own country. The 1990s, however, showed the actual beginning and growth of the migration, which grew to approximately 1200 people during the following years. By the 2000s, the size of the Korean community grew immensely, becoming the 25th largest Korean community in the entire world. Some areas in India which show significant growth of the Korean community are Tamil Nadu, Karnataka, West Bengal, National Capital Region, and Maharashtra.

== Varanasi ==
Varanasi or Kashi or Benaras is one of the major religious cities in India, situated beside the banks of the Ganges river in the state of Uttar Pradesh, which welcomes tourists from all over the world. The city witnesses huge numbers of Korean migrants due to the many students attending Banaras Hindu University (BHU), particularly studying Indian art and aesthetics. This is due to their bond with Buddhism and the legend of marital ties between Princess Heo of Ayodhya in India and King Suro of Gaya, an ancient kingdom in Korea.

Places like Bengali Tola and other parts of Varanasi feature Korean-style cafes, restaurants, and K-Pop music stores.

== Food ==
Some Korean-style cafes and restaurants are run solely by Indians, while others are run jointly with Korean friends or relatives. Korean design elements are common, such as wallpaper featuring Hangul script, traditional masks and fans, and low-seating arrangements. Dishes such as bibimbap, containing vegetables, chicken, sticky rice, soya sauce, soya chilli paste, and sesame oil, and rabokki, a street food made with ramen, rice cakes, spicy sauce, boiled eggs and noodles, are served.

== Music ==
Varanasi also has K-Pop CDs and poster shows. Koreans, particularly the younger generation, have shown enthusiasm in learning classical Indian music instruments such as the tabla and sitar. Many are fluent in Hindi and enjoy Indian cinema and music. The similarity between Korean musical instruments like the gayageum (also called kayagum), a 12-stringed instrument, and the sitar, an Indian instrument with 18, 19 or even 21 strings, has also helped by being an extension of cultural exchange.

== Korean language ==
BHU offers diploma courses in Korean, enabling Indian students to pursue an education in the language.

== Extension of India in South Korea ==
A group of students from the prestigious Wonkwang Digital University or WDU from Iksan, South Korea, came to BHU to attend an exchange programme on ayurveda and yoga and upon their return, established a club named Ganga in WDU. The university includes the Department of Yoga Studies and Meditation. Almost every year, a number of Korean students come to BHU for the exchange programme, initiating the joint signing of a memorandum of understanding in 2005.
