= Tomb of King Suro =

Tomb in Gimhae, South Korea

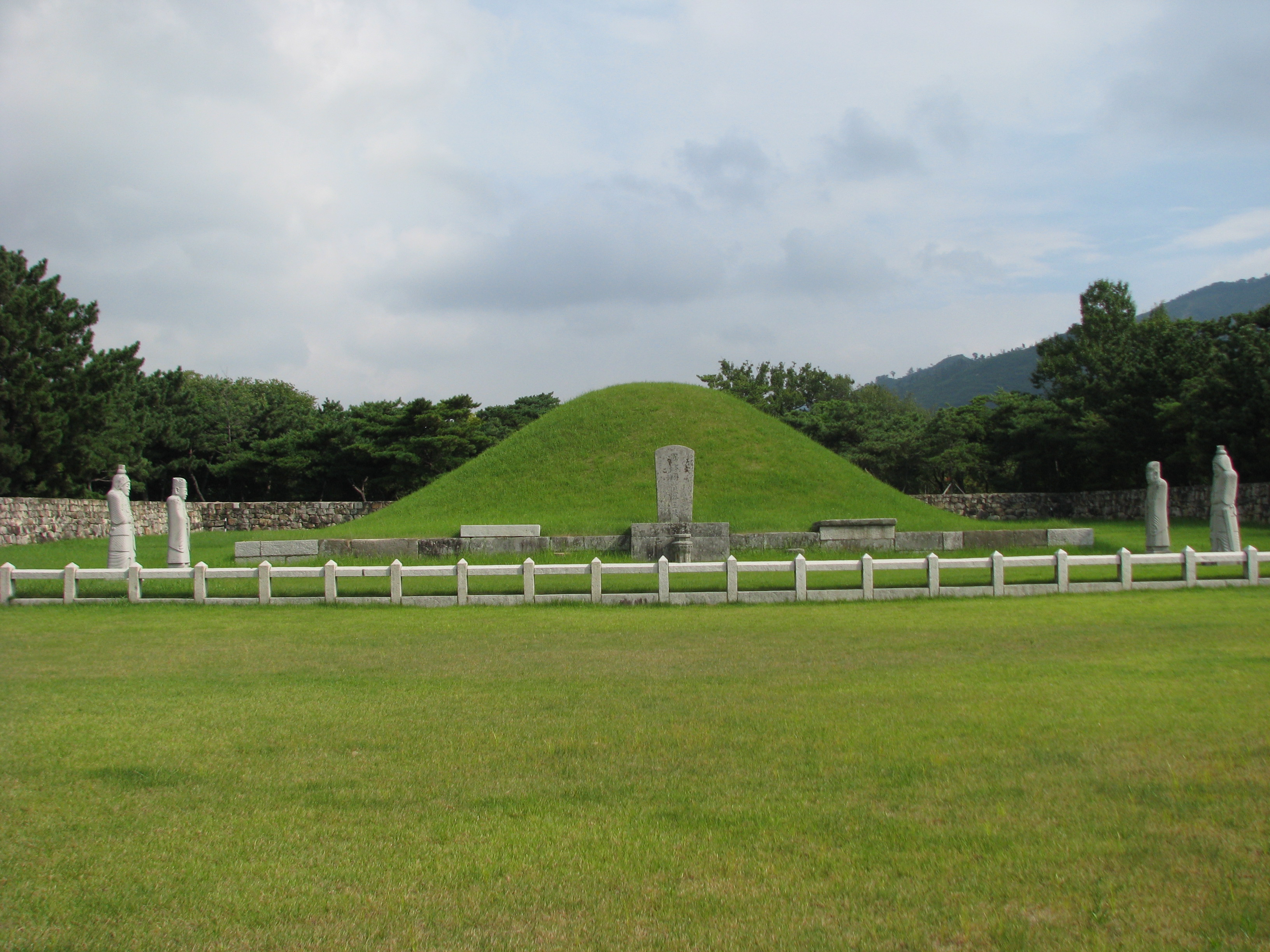
- The tomb (2008)
- Interactive map of Tomb of King Suro
- Location: Gimhae, South Korea
- Coordinates: 35.2352°N 128.8783°E
- Built for: Suro of Geumgwan Gaya

Historic Sites of South Korea
- Official name: Tomb of King Suro, Gimhae
- Designated: 1963-01-21

The Tomb of King Suro (Korean: 수로왕릉; Hanja: 首露王陵) is a tomb of the Gaya confederacy monarch Suro (fl. 2nd century) and founder of the Gimhae Kim clan. It is located in Gimhae, South Korea. On January 21, 1963, it was made a Historic Site of South Korea.

It is unknown when the tomb was constructed; Suro died in 199 (Korean calendar). There are a number of stone monuments that honor his achievements. The tomb was in good condition even into the Goryeo period (918–1392), but was reduced to ruins in the Joseon period (1392–1897). It was repaired in 1580. The tomb was robbed by the Japanese during the 1592–1598 Imjin War. Suro's descendents perform jesa here biyearly.

== See also ==
- Tomb of Queen Consort of King Suro, in Korea
- Memorial of Heo Hwang-ok, Ayodhya, in India
- Preah Thong and Neang Neak, similar in Cambodia
