= Ancient Tombs in Gusan-dong, Gimhae =

Gaya-era tombs in Gimhae, South Korea

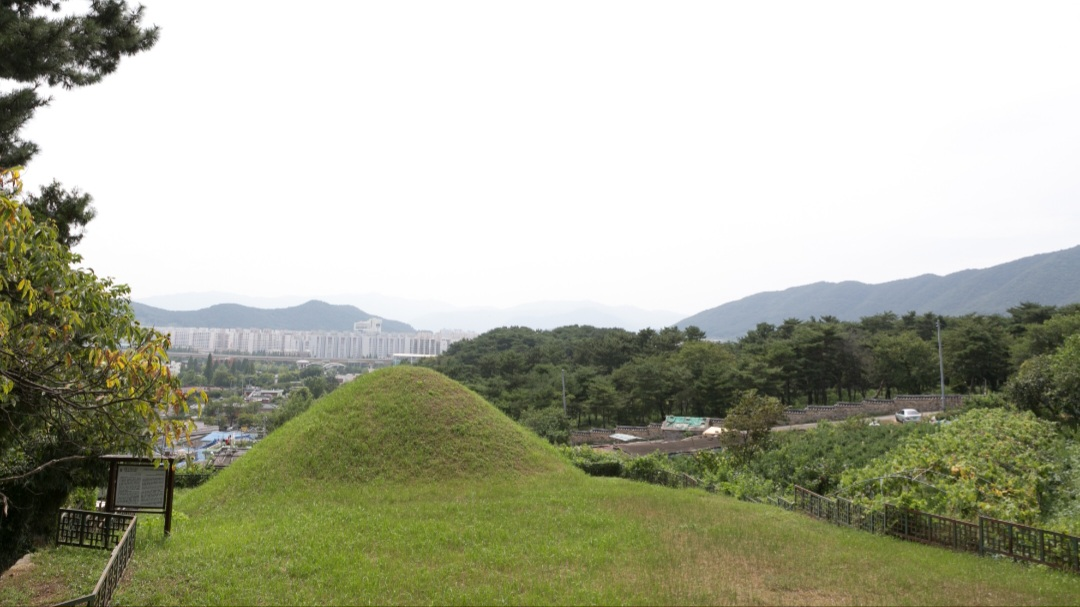
- Some of the tombs
- Interactive map of Ancient Tombs in Gusan-dong, Gimhae
- Location: Gimhae, South Korea
- Coordinates: 35°14′38″N 128°52′38″E

Historic Sites of South Korea
- Designated: 1963-01-21

The Ancient Tombs in Gusan-dong, Gimhae (Korean: 김해 구산동 고분군; Hanja: 金海龜山洞古墳群) are tombs of the Gaya confederacy in Gusan-dong, Gimhae, South Korea. On January 21, 1963, they were made Historic Sites of South Korea.

They are tumuli tombs located on the southwest slopes of the mountain Bunseongsan. They are located near the Tomb of Queen Consort of King Suro. Four tombs have been identified, but there are believed to have been more in the area.
