= Hayang Heo clan =

Korean clan from North Gyeongsang Province

- Country: Korea
- Current region: Gyeongsan
- Founder: Heo Kang-an

Hayang Heo clan (Korean: 하양 허씨; Hanja: 河陽 許氏) is the third most populous Heo (often spelled as Hur or Huh) clan. Their Bon-gwan is in Hayang, Gyeongsan city, North Gyeongsang Province. Their founder was Heo Kang-an. He was a descendant of Queen Heo Hwang-ok, who was originally from India. He served as a local governor in Hayang, during the reign of King Hyeonjong of the Goryeo Dynasty and settled there. According to studies in 2015, the number of Hayang Heo clan members was 20,608.

== Known descendants ==
- Heo Jo (1369-1440), Joseon-era scholar, Second State Councilor during the reign of Sejong the Great
- Heo Im (1570-1647), Joseon-era physician
- Huh Yun-jin (born 2001), Korean-American singer, member of Kpop girl group Le Sserafim
- Huh Mi-mi (born 2002), South Korean judoka, Olympic silver medalist

== See also ==
- Korean clan names of foreign origin
