= Taein Heo clan =

Korean clan from North Jeolla Province

- Country: Korea
- Current region: Jeongeup
- Founder: Heo Sa mun

Taein Heo clan (Korean: 태인 허씨; Hanja: 泰仁 許氏) is one of the Korean clans. Their Bon-gwan was in Jeongeup, North Jeolla Province. According to the research in 2015, the number of Taein Heo clan was 11990. Their founder was Heo Sa mun. Heo Sa mun was a 30th descendant of Heo Hwang-ok (meaning yellow jade) who was a princess of Ayuta and Queen consort of Suro of Geumgwan Gaya, a first king of Gaya confederacy. Heo Sa mun was a loyalist of Taejo of Goryeo in Goryeo dynasty and was appointed as Prince of Sisan (Hanja: 詩山君).

== See also ==
- Korean clan names of foreign origin
