= Gimhae Heo clan =

Korean royal family

- Country: Korea
- Current region: Gimhae, Busan
- Founder: Heo Yeom (許琰)
- Connected members: Huh Kyung-young; Heo Sung-tae; Heo Kyung-hwan; Hur Nam-sik; Heo Jeong; Huh Chang-soo; Heo Hwang-ok; Hyun Jin-young; Huh Chang-soo; Huh Tae-soo

The Gimhae Heo clan (Korean: 김해 허씨; Hanja: 金海 許氏) is a Korean clan. This clan traces their origin to King Suro and his legendary Queen Heo Hwang-ok, who are mentioned in the 13th-century Korean chronicle Samguk Yusa. King Suro was the founder of Gaya confederacy. According to a 2015 survey, the population of Gimhae Heo clan is 134068.

The founder of Gimhae Heo clan, a 35th descendant of Queen Heo Hwang-ok and King Suro, was Heo Yeom who served in the court of King Munjong of Goryeo. He was appointed as the Prince of Garak / Gaya (Hanja: 駕洛君).

More than six million present day Koreans, especially from the Gimhae Kim clan, the Gimhae Heo clan and the Incheon Lee clan associate their ancestry to royal family of Gaya, and these clans place restrictions on marriage with each other due to the shared ancestors. Today, the Gimhae Kim clan is the largest clan group among them.

The Gimhae Heo clan and Incheon Lee clan, descended from the two sons of King Suro who used their mother's Queen Heo Hwang-ok's surname, instead of their father's. According to Samguk Yusa, Queen Heo Hwang-ok became the wife of King Suro of Geumgwan Gaya at the age of 16, after having arrived in Gaya confederacy in Korea in the year 48 AD by boat from a distant kingdom called "Ayuta", making her the first queen of Geumgwan Gaya. Her native kingdom is believed to be located in India by some, there is however no mention of her in any pre-modern Indian sources. There is a tomb in Gimhae in Korea, that are believed by some to be of King Suro and Queen Heo, and a memorial of Queen Heo Hwang-ok in the Hindu holy city of Ayodhya in India.
