= Queen Mojeong =

Queen of the Gaya confederacy

Mojong
- Queen consort of Geumgwan Gaya
- Spouse: Geodeung of Geumgwan Gaya
- Issue: Mapum of Geumgwan Gaya

- Queen Mojeong
- Hangul: 모정
- Hanja: 慕貞
- Revised Romanization: Mojeong
- McCune–Reischauer: Mojŏng

Queen Mojeong (Korean: 모정; Hanja: 慕貞) was a wife of Geodeung of Geumgwan Gaya, the second king of Gaya confederacy. She gave birth of the third king, Mapum of Geumgwan Gaya. She was a daughter of Sin Po who was attendant of Heo Hwang-ok for her marriage from India. In Hwarang Segi, she was recorded as Sin Po's daughter, but in Samgungnyusa, she was recorded as Sin Po's wife.

== Family ==
- Father: Sinbo (신보)
  - Husband: Geodeung of Geumgwan Gaya (거등왕)
    - Son: Mapum of Geumgwan Gaya (마품왕)
