= Geodeung of Geumgwan Gaya =

King of Gaya

Geodeung Wang 居登王 거등왕
- King of Geumgwan Gaya
- Predecessor: Suro of Geumgwan Gaya
- Successor: Mapum of Geumgwan Gaya
- Died: 259
- Spouse: Mojong

- Geodeung of Geumgwan Gaya
- Hangul: 거등왕
- Hanja: 居登王
- RR: Geodeungwang
- MR: Kŏdŭngwang

Geodeung, also called Geodeung Wang, was the king of Gaya, a confederacy of chiefdoms that existed in the Nakdong River valley of Korea during the Three Kingdoms era, from 199 to 259. Legend holds that he was the son of King Suro of Gaya and Suro's queen, Heo Hwang-ok. Legend says also they had in total ten sons. Geodeung Wang was married with Queen Mojong, who was the daughter of Sin Po Ch'onpukyong(泉府卿) and Mojong. Sin Po was a courtier in Heo Hwang-ok's entourage.

== Family ==
- Father: King Suro (수로왕; 首露王)
- Mother: Heo Hwang-ok (허황옥; 許黃玉)
- Wife: Lady Mojeong (모정부인; 慕貞夫人) – daughter of Sin Po (신보; 申輔).
  - Son: King Mapum (마품왕; 馬品王)

== See also ==
- List of monarchs of Korea
- History of Korea
- Three Kingdoms of Korea

| Preceded by Suro of Geumgwan Gaya | King of Gaya; 199–259 | Succeeded by Mapum of Geumgwan Gaya |
