= Live Up to Your Name =

2017 fantasy medical South Korean television series

- Promotional poster
- Also known as: Live Up to Your Name, Dr. Heo
- Hangul: 명불허전
- Lit.: Deserving of the Name
- RR: Myeongbulheojeon
- MR: Myŏngburhŏjŏn
- Genre: Fantasy; Medical drama; Historical period drama; Romance comedy
- Created by: Studio Dragon
- Written by: Kim Eun-hee
- Directed by: Hong Jong-chan
- Starring: Kim Nam-gil; Kim Ah-joong
- Country of origin: South Korea
- Original language: Korean
- No. of episodes: 16

Production
- Executive producers: Moon Suk-hwan; Oh Kwang-hee
- Camera setup: Single-camera
- Running time: 70 minutes
- Production company: Bon Factory Worldwide

Original release
- Network: tvN
- Release: August 12 – October 1, 2017

Live Up to Your Name (Korean: 명불허전) is a 2017 historical time travel South Korean television series. It brings Heo Im (a medical scientist from Joseon portrayed by Kim Nam-gil) to present day Seoul, where he meets the surgeon, Choi Yeon-kyung (Kim Ah-joong). The series marks Kim Nam-gil's small screen comeback after four years. It aired on tvN from August 12 to October 1, 2017.

Its final episode recorded a 6.907% nationwide audience share according to Nielsen paid platform, making the episode one of the highest rated in Korean cable television history.

== Synopsis ==
Heo Im (Kim Nam-gil) is a Joseon doctor of Traditional Korean medicine, specializing in acupuncture. He worked at a clinic for the poor during the daytime, and earned a fortune by making secret visits to nobles and high-ranking officials' houses at night. After gaining notoriety for his great skills, he was tasked to help treat the king's migraines. Unfortunately, his anxiety got the best of him and he was charged with treason. Unwilling to accept jail, he escaped capture, but was chased by soldiers. He was eventually cornered into a river and fatally shot by arrows, and fell to his supposed death.

Death never comes and he awakens in modern Seoul-Korea, realizing he has somehow time traveled. Dazed, lost and confused, he runs into Choi Yeon-kyung (Kim Ah-joong), a cardiothoracic fellow surgeon at Shinhae Hospital, and begins an unlikely relationship across time and space.

== Cast ==
=== Main ===
- Kim Nam-gil as Heo Im (Child: Moon woo-jin)/ Heo Bong-tak, an acupuncturist who time travels to Seoul 400 years later when he was about to drown.
- Kim Ah-joong as Choi Yeon-kyung, a 21st century surgeon.

=== Supporting ===
- Moon Ga-young as Dong Mak-Gae, Heo Im's loyal assistant who has dreams of becoming a doctor just like her boss.
- Kim Myung-gon as Ma Sung-tae, a renowned but greedy doctor who is the director of a renowned Eastern medicine hospital in Seoul. He is also the grandfather of Yoo Jae-Ha (Yeon-kyung's childhood friend).
- Um Hyo-sup as Heo Jun, a legendary physician from the Joseon period who was active during the reigns of King Seonjo and King Gwanghae.
- Ahn Suk-hwan as Shin Myung-hoon, the director of the hospital where Yeon-kyung works and consequently her boss/ Minister of War (Joseon), an unnamed corrupt war minister of the Joseon dynasty during the Imjin War.
- Maeng Sang-hoon as Yoo Chan-sung
- Lee Dae-yeon as Professor Hwang, her teacher and superior at the hospital.
- Oh Dae-hwan as Doo-chil, one of the servants of the corrupt Minister of War of Joseon.
- Tae Hang-ho as Min Byung-gi, one of the nurses at Yeon-kyung's grandfather's oriental medicine clinic.
- Kim Byung-choon as Kwon Ji
- Yoo Min-kyu as Yoo Jae-ha, a young doctor of oriental medicine who is Yeon-kyung's childhood friend and Sung-tae's grandson/ Yoo Jin-oh (Joseon), a nobleman from the Joseon Dynasty who has a beef with Heo Im.
- Jin Seon-kyu as Yeon-i's father, the father of Yeon-i (one of Heo Im's patients)
- Yoon Joo-sang as Choi Chun-Sool, a renowned acupuncturist who owns the Haeminseo Oriental Medicine Clinic and is Yeon-kyung's grandfather.
- Byeon Woo-seok as Heo Jun's assistant
- Kim Sung-joo as Kim Min-jae
- Roh Jeong-eui as Oh Ha-ra, a young girl with heart problems whose life is saved by Heo Im.
- Lee Do-yeop as Oh Ha-ra's father
- Lee Ga-ryeong as Gisaeng
- Shin Rin-ah as Yeon-i, a sick girl and one of Heo Im's patients during the Joseon Dynasty.
- Yeom Hye-ran as Restaurant owner (ep. #4)
- Hiromitsu Takeda as Sayaka (Joseon) (Note: On some websites (such as Korea JoongAng Daily), the pronunciation of Kim Chung-seon's original name (i.e. his Japanese name) is Sayaga (with the letter G in place of K)) / Kim Chung-seon (Baptized name after Imjin War), a Japanese general who originally commanded the Japanese Right Army for Kato Kiyomasa before defecting to Korea during the Imjin War. (Note: The reason why Sayaga/Sayaka or Kim Chung-seon defected from Japan to Korea was due to the fact that he doesn't want to kill the innocent people of Joseon, in addition to having always revered the culture of Joseon and China.)

== Ratings ==
Ep.	Original broadcast date	Average audience share		
Ep.	Original broadcast date	Nielsen Korea		TNmS
Ep.	Original broadcast date	Nationwide	Seoul	Nationwide
1	August 12, 2017	2.715%	2.855%	3.2%
2	August 13, 2017	3.995%	4.536%	3.3%
3	August 19, 2017	4.541%	5.227%	3.6%
4	August 20, 2017	5.998%	6.572%	5.0%
5	August 26, 2017	4.347%	4.659%	3.7%
6	August 27, 2017	5.617%	5.968%	4.7%
7	September 2, 2017	5.541%	6.064%	4.2%
8	September 3, 2017	6.357%	6.712%	4.8%
9	September 9, 2017	5.965%	6.802%	5.3%
10	September 10, 2017	6.520%	7.688%	6.0%
11	September 16, 2017	5.889%	6.636%	5.3%
12	September 17, 2017	6.164%	6.848%	5.0%
13	September 23, 2017	5.590%	6.516%	5.4%
14	September 24, 2017	5.364%	6.142%	3.4%
15	September 30, 2017	4.959%	5.641%	3.9%
16	October 1, 2017	6.907%	7.888%	5.5%
Average		5.404%	6.047%	4.5%
In the table above, the blue numbers represent the lowest ratings and the red numbers represent the highest ratings.; This series aired on a cable channel/pay TV which normally has a relatively smaller audience compared to free-to-air TV/public broadcasters (KBS, SBS, MBC and EBS).
