= Tomb of Queen Consort of King Suro =

Tomb in Gimhae, South Korea

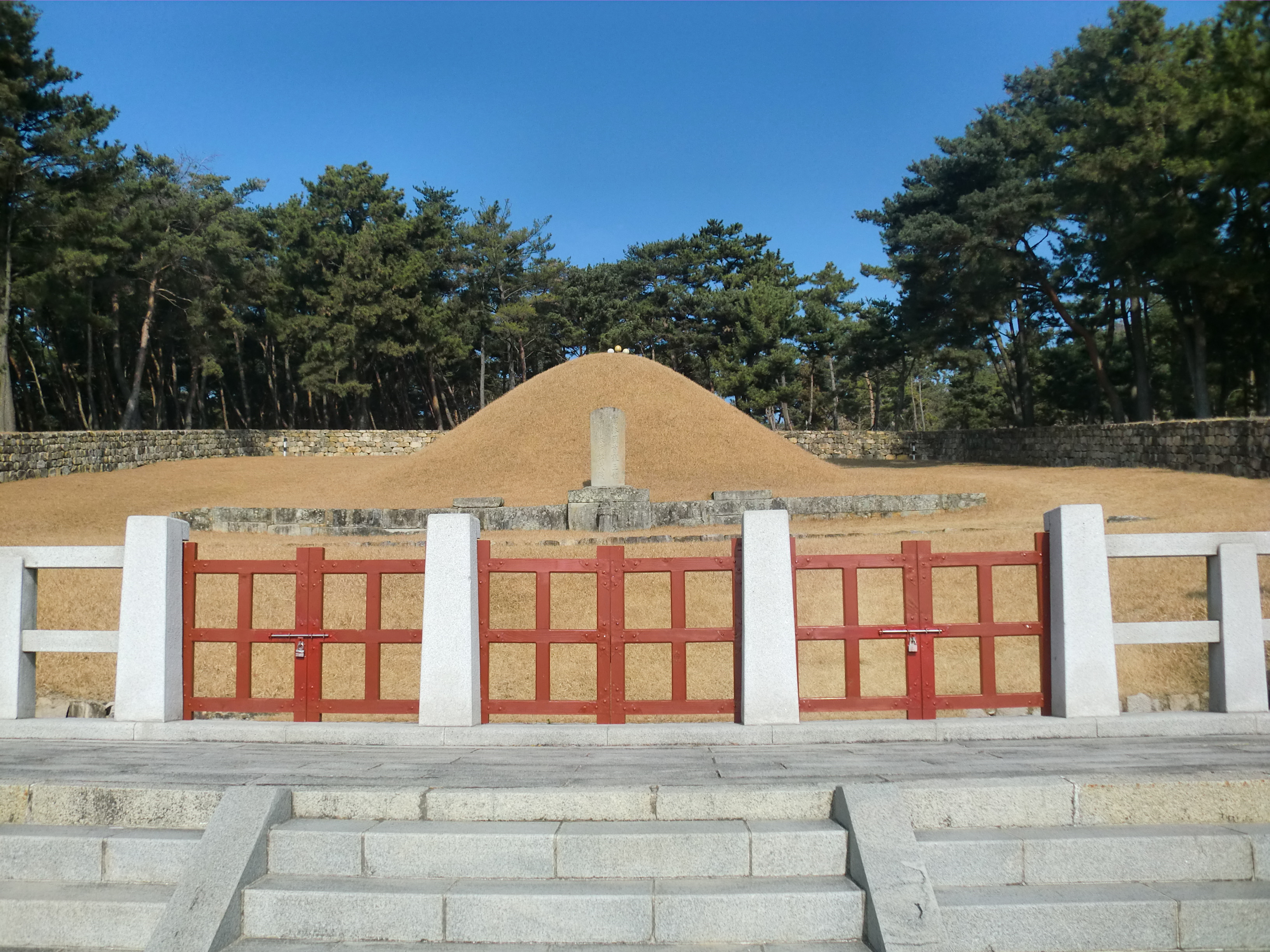
- The tomb (2012)
- Interactive map of Tomb of Queen Consort of King Suro
- Location: Gimhae, South Korea
- Coordinates: 35°14′36″N 128°52′38″E
- Built for: Heo Hwang-ok

Historic Sites of South Korea
- Official name: Tomb of Queen Consort of King Suro, Gimhae
- Designated: 1963-01-21

The Tomb of Queen Consort of King Suro (Korean: 수로왕비릉; Hanja: 首露王妃陵) is the tomb of Heo Hwang-ok, the queen consort of Suro of Geumgwan Gaya. It is located in Gimhae, South Korea. On January 21, 1963, it was made a Historic Site of South Korea.

The queen consort originally came from India at age 16. She married Suro and bore him nine sons. Two of them kept her surname and became the forefathers of a Heo lineage. Her tomb is a tumulus that is 5 m (16 ft) high. There are various buildings and stone monuments surrounding the tomb. The tomb's area was enlarged in 1446, during the reign of Sejong the Great. The tomb was robbed by the Japanese during the 1592–1598 Imjin War. It was repaired in 1641. Her descendents now hold jesa (ancestral rites) to her twice a year.

== See also ==
- Memorial of Heo Hwang-ok, Ayodhya, in India
- Tomb of King Suro, in Korea
- Preah Thong and Neang Neak, similar in Cambodia
- Sri Lumay, similar in Cebu city in Philippines
