= Sinbo =

Minister in Gaya confederacy

- Hangul: 신보
- Hanja: 申輔
- RR: Sinbo
- MR: Sinbo

Sinbo (Korean: 신보; Hanja: 申輔) was a minister who served the kings in Gaya confederacy. Queen Mojong who was the second wife of Geodeung of Geumgwan Gaya was his daughter. He served as government officer of Gaya confederacy. In 48, when Heo Hwang-ok came over from India to Gaya confederacy, he also came from India as an attendant of Heo Hwang-ok who married into Gaya confederacy.

== Family ==
- Daughter: Queen Mojong (Korean: 모정; Hanja: 慕貞)
