= Koreans in India =

Ethnic group

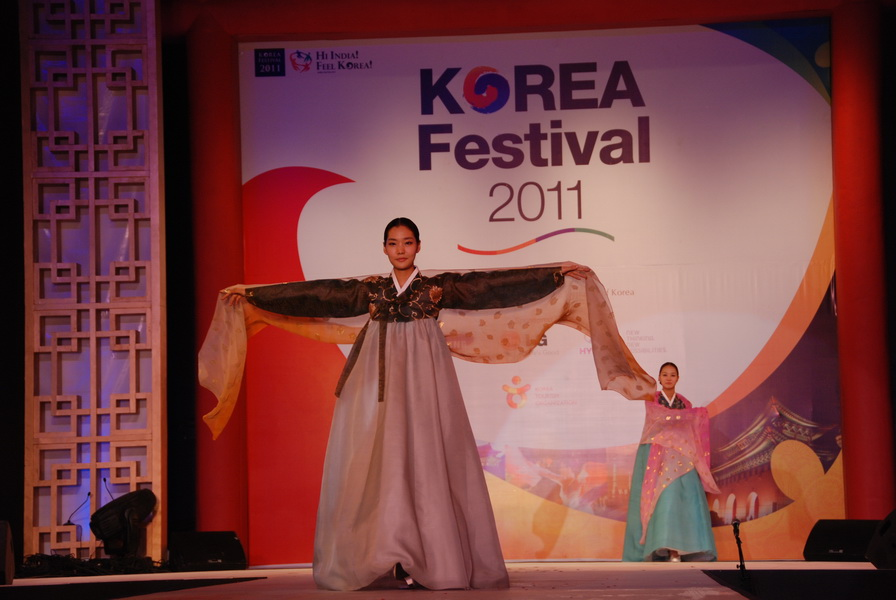
- Korea Festival held in India, 2011

Total population
- 17000 (2026)

Regions with significant populations
- Tamil Nadu: 4,550
- Maharashtra: 3,934
- National Capital Region: 3,545
- Karnataka: 880
- Andhra Pradesh: 870
- West Bengal: 209
- Elsewhere: 785

Religion
- Korean Buddhism, Christianity

Related ethnic groups
- Korean diaspora

There is a small Korean community in India, consisting largely of South Korean expatriate professionals and their families, as well as some missionaries and international students at Indian universities.

== Migration history ==
In 526 CE, Korean monk Gyeomik, went to India to learn Sanskrit and study the monastic discipline Vinaya, and founded the Gyeyul (Korean: 계율종; Hanja: 戒律宗; RR: Gyeyuljong) branch of Buddhism that specializes in the study of Vinaya which derives directly from the Indian Vinaya School.

In 673 CE, Chinese Buddhist pilgrim, Yijing who reached India, recorded that the people of the Indian subcontinent were familiar with Korea's customs and beliefs and they regarded Koreans as "worshipers of the rooster". This concept about Koreans was grounded in a legend of the Silla dynasty.

By early 1950s, migration of Koreans to India had commenced; the Korean Association of India was founded in that decade in New Delhi by three South Koreans who had gone into exile after being released from prison in their home country. However, large-scale growth in the community did not begin until the 1990s. In 1997, the Korean community in India numbered just 1,229 people, according to South Korean government statistics; it grew somewhat by 42% to 1,745 people by 2003, but then in the next six years it nearly quintupled in size, making them the 25th-largest Korean community in the world, behind Koreans in Guatemala and ahead of Koreans in Paraguay.

== Population distribution ==
=== South Koreans ===
Chennai was the earliest hub of the Korean community in India due to Hyundai's decision to open factories there in 1995. Koreans concentrated largely in the Kilpauk township, which has acquired the nickname of "Little Korea" as a result. Later communities in Delhi and Bangalore experienced rapid growth in the 2000s. According to the 2013 statistics of South Korea's Ministry of Foreign Affairs, 4,550 Koreans lived in Tamil Nadu, 3,934 in Maharashtra, 3,545 in the National Capital Region (mainly in New Delhi, Gurgaon, and Noida), 1,042 in Goa, 880 in Karnataka, and 209 in West Bengal. Only 11 of these held Indian citizenship.

=== North Koreans in India ===
A small population of North Koreans is also present in India. They are centered in New Delhi, where North Korea has an embassy.

== Business and employment ==
Most corporate expatriates come for maximum three- to five-year stints before returning home. In New Delhi, major employers of South Korean expatriates include Samsung and LG Electronics. In the Chennai area, many work for Hyundai Motors and its suppliers. After Kia Motors opened its production unit in Bagepalli in Andhra Pradesh more than 1200 Koreans arrived in India and mostly reside in North Bengaluru. Some expatriates have also opened Korean restaurants, aimed largely at their co-ethnics rather than local Indians, in Chennai, New Delhi, and Bangalore, though not in Mumbai.

== Education ==
According to MOFA's statistics, 109,000 of the South Koreans in India in 2015 held student visas. As early as 2002, roughly 200 South Koreans were studying at local universities in New Delhi, mainly the University of Delhi and Jawaharlal Nehru University. At Delhi University, with roughly 90 students from South Korea, they have even formed a Korean Students Union as well as a traditional Korean drum group. The Korean Association, with an office in the Hauz Khas Complex, also holds extracurricular Korean-language classes for Korean expatriate children. South Korean information technology students have also been attending courses at private institutes in the Pune area since 2002. There are also some North Korean students studying in New Delhi as well.

There is also an increasing number of South Korean primary and secondary students entering India on student visas; their parents send them unaccompanied to international boarding schools there in order to take advantage of inexpensive English-medium education, at roughly half the price of comparable schools in the United States or United Kingdom. In addition to language proficiency and cost, the reputation of Indian mathematics education, seen as even more rigorous than that in South Korea, let alone the US or UK, is another draw for parents. In 2006, there were 1,435 South Korean primary and secondary visa students in India, according to the Indian embassy in Seoul. For example, South Korean children comprised 16% of all students at the American Embassy School in New Delhi, making them the largest nationality behind Americans, and 20% of the students at the Woodstock School in Landour, Uttarakhand. Many students are studying in Trio World Academy, Bengaluru as it offers extended Korean school program and is closer to the establishment of Kia Motors.

In New Delhi, many South Korean adult expatriates have joined in Hindi classes; about half of all foreign students enrolled in advanced Hindi classes or certificate or degree courses are Koreans, and major employers such as Samsung have organised year-long Hindi courses for their employees.

== Media ==
The Korean Association of India publishes a bimonthly magazine in Korean, Namaste India.

== Religion and pilgrimage to India ==
Buddhist expansion in Asia, from Buddhist heartland in northern India (dark orange) starting 5th century BCE, to Buddhist majority realm (orange), and historical extent of Buddhism influences (yellow). The overland and maritime "Silk Roads" were interlinked and complementary, forming what scholars have called the "great circle of Buddhism".

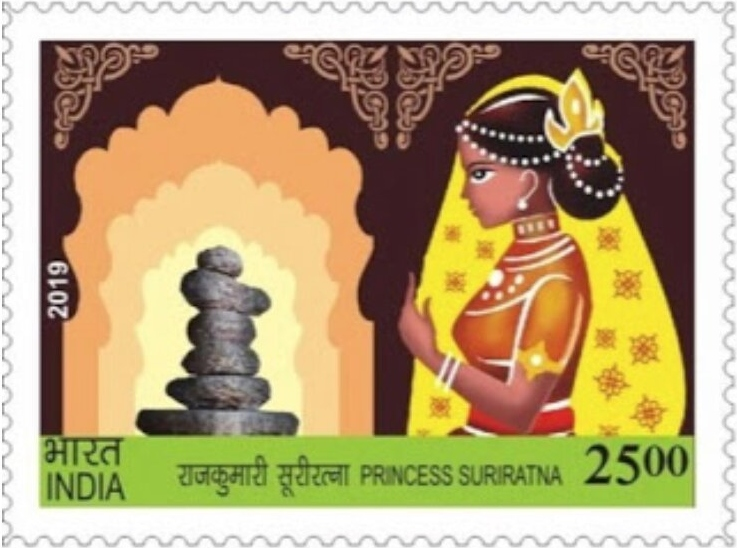
A commemorative Rs. 25.00 postage stamp on Princess Suriratna (Queen Heo Hwang-ok ) was issued by India in 2019.

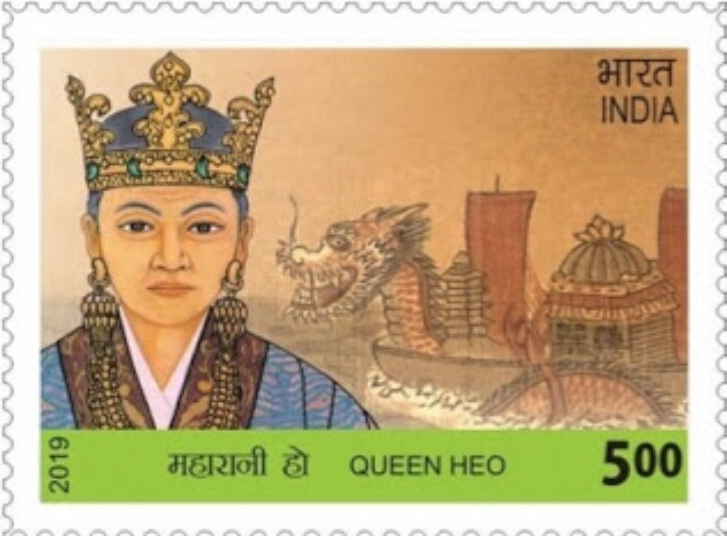
A commemorative Rs. 5.00 postage stamp on Queen Heo Hwang-ok (Princess Suriratna) was issued by India in 2019.

Sarnath, where Gautama Buddha first taught the Dharma, has long been a popular destination for travelling Korean Buddhists, as in the case of Hyecho's 8th-century pilgrimage there.

Memorial of Heo Hwang-ok in Ayodhya, is visited by a large number of Koreans, especially around jesa in April, to pay tribute to Queen Heo Hwang-ok as she is considered an ancestor to large number of Koreans. She was supposedly of Indian-origin from Ayodhya and had traveled to Korea to marry King Suro of Geumgwan Gaya in 48 CE. Over 6 million Koreans, especially of Gimhae Kim clan, Gimhae Heo clan, and Incheon Lee clan, believe Queen Heo to be their ancestor. Her association with Ayodhya is based on the book Heo Hwang-ok Route: From India to Gaya of Korea by a senior archeologist and emeritus professor at Hanyang University, Kim Byung-mo, which has been called speculative by some critics.

Koreans have formed a number of Christian churches in India, including three in New Delhi, two in Chennai, and one in Mumbai. Local Christian denominations also have Korean members, as in Pune, where the Church of North India began offering Korean-language services from 2005. Some Koreans also attend English-language Christian services, but where numbers permit, they have broken off to hold their own services in Korean.

== See also ==
- Heo Hwang-ok, the Indian Queen of 48 CE Korea
- Koreans in Varanasi
- Memorial of Heo Hwang-ok, Ayodhya
- Buddhism in Korea
- Hinduism in Korea
- Indians in Korea
- India–South Korea relations
- India–North Korea relations
- History of Korea
