= Garakguk-gi =

11th-century lost Korean book on folklore

Garakguk-gi (Korean: 가락국기, Hanja: 駕洛國記, lit. 'Records of Garak State') is a lost book that is referenced in the Korean history book Samguk yusa.

== Description ==
According to Samguk yusa, it was written by Geumguanjujisa (금관주지사, 金官州知事) in the reign of Munjong of the Goryeo dynasty (1046–1083), but the author is unknown.

The book is speculated to be a chronicle of folklore that was popularized in the regions of Gaya (present day South Gyeongsang Province) after its fall during the Goryeo dynasty.

The contents include legends surrounding King Suro of Geumgwan Gaya with only the plots remaining, however, many consider the stories to be mere legends that focus heavily on fantastical elements.

Historians do not consider the book as an official historic document due to the inaccuracies surrounding some of its claims, but despite the low level of factual accuracy, it's still considered an invaluable resource for studying the history of the Gaya confederacy.
