= Heo Hwang-ok =

Legendary queen of Geumgwan Gaya (32–189)

- Empress Heo
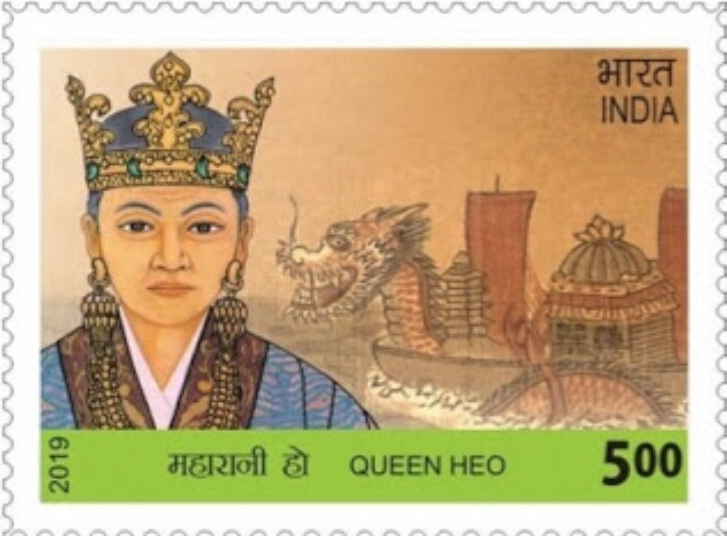
- A commemorative ₹ 5.00 postage stamp on Queen Heo Hwang-ok was issued by India in 2019.

Queen consort of Geumgwan Gaya
- Tenure: 189 AD
- Predecessor: Princess Mother Jeonggyeon
- Successor: Lady Mojeong
- Born: 32 AD; State of Ayuta
- Died: 189 AD (aged about 157) _{(1st day, 3rd months in Lunar)} Gimhae, South Gyeongsang Province
- Burial: Tomb of Queen Consort of King Suro, Gimhae, South Korea
- Spouse: King Suro of Gaya
- Issue: King Geodeung of Gaya; 10 other sons Lady Kim of Garak State
Posthumous name
- Queen Mother Boju (보주태후, 普州太后)
- Korean: 허황옥 許黃玉

Heo Hwang-ok (Korean: 허황옥; Hanja: 許黃玉; 32–189AD) also known as Empress Boju (보주태후; 普州太后), was a legendary queen mentioned in the Samguk yusa, a 13th-century Korean chronicle.

According to the Samguk yusa, she became the wife of King Suro of Geumgwan Gaya (part of the Kaya confederacy) at the age of 16, after having arrived by boat from a distant kingdom called "Ayuta (阿踰陁)" with many theorizing it to be located in India, Thailand or Central Asia (i.e. Tibet).

There is a tomb in Gimhae, South Korea, that is believed to be hers, and a memorial in Ayodhya, India, built in 2020.

== Origins ==
The legend of Heo is found in Garakguk-gi (the Record of Garak Kingdom) which is currently lost, but referenced within the Samguk yusa. According to the legend, Heo was a princess of the kingdom of "Ayuta". The extant records do not identify "Ayuta" except as a "distant country". Popular culture often associate "Ayuta" with India, but there are no records of the legend in India itself.

=== Northern India ===
Byung-mo Kim, a professor and anthropologist at Hanyang University, linked "Ayuta" with Ayodhya in India based on phonetic similarity.

However, the location of Ayodhya is considered too inland for the queen to have allegedly traveled to Kaya, therefore, the claim is often scrutinized.

=== Southern India ===
A book called Beautiful Korea published in 1968 alludes to her coming from "Ayuta in the south of India". Recently, non-academics commonly interpret this as the Ay Kingdom based on regional approximation (southern India) and phonetic similarity: Ayuta and Ay. However, this is considered as retrospective pseudohistory that actively attempts to create a common ground without providing hard evidence, relying only on shallow speculations.

Also, unlike the Ayodhya theory, the idea is not widespread nor supported by any mainstream Korean historians. The claim that she came from the "south of India" is only found in the 1968 book which also does not specify any kingdom, only discussing vague estimations. It is likely based on an old fringe theory that posits that she sailed from India to Kaya by sea; which naturally points to the coastal regions of southern India, hence the vagueness of the claim.

=== Southeast Asia ===
Scholars such as Grafton K. Mintz and Tae-hung Ha theorized that "Ayuta" was the Ayutthaya Kingdom of Thailand due to phonetic similarity, similar to Kim with Ayodhya.

Mitz and Ha took note of the phonetic similarity between "Ayuta" and the Ayutthaya Kingdom, but leaned more towards the name having an Indian origin. In addition, according to George Cœdès, the kingdom of Ayutthaya was not founded until the year 1350, which was after the publication of Samguk yusa.

=== Central Asia ===
More recent theories suggest that the queen's origin was in fact closer to Western China or Central Asia. Hwa-seob Song, a professor at Chung-Ang University, claims that "Ayuta" was within central parts of Asia; that Queen Heo's home kingdom was either Tibet or an Uyghur nation, and not India (South Asia) or Thailand (Southeast Asia). Song points out the differences in the labelling of the kingdoms in native Korean and states that "Ayuta" cannot be an Indian nation.

Despite numerous theories and claims, Queen Heo's true origin is yet to be discovered. In recent years, her origin is believed to be a religious symbol rather than a historical fact due to numerous inconsistencies (see Controversy surrounding her existence).

== Names ==
Her official name in Korea is "황옥 (Hwang-ok)" as was mentioned in the Samguk yusa. Her family name "허 (Heo)" was given to her by King Suro when she naturalized, according to the legend. After becoming the queen, she was known as "허황후 (Empress Heo)" or "보주태후 (Empress Boju)".

Recently, she is commonly known as "Suriratna" or "Sembavalam" in India. However contrary to popular belief, the names do not appear in the Samguk yusa and are likely created recently.

The name "Suriratna" is in fact from a comic book called Sri Ratna Kim Suro - The Legend of an Indian Princess in Korea (2015) by Indian author N. Parthasarathi. The name is based on the author's educated guess on the name "Hwang-ok" meaning Yellow Jade, making it "Suriratna", meaning Precious Stone in Hindi. In reality, there is no historical evidence that backs this claim, as Hindi as we know it today, would not have been standardized until the 13th century. Regardless of its authenticity, the name was popularized in several news articles within Korea and India despite its contemporary origins and lack of mention in Samguk yusa.

The name "Sembavalam" is often mentioned when postulating that Queen Heo was from Tamil Nadu. However, similar to "Suriratna", the name is not found anywhere in the Samguk yusa and is most likely a modern interpretation.

== Marriage to Suro ==
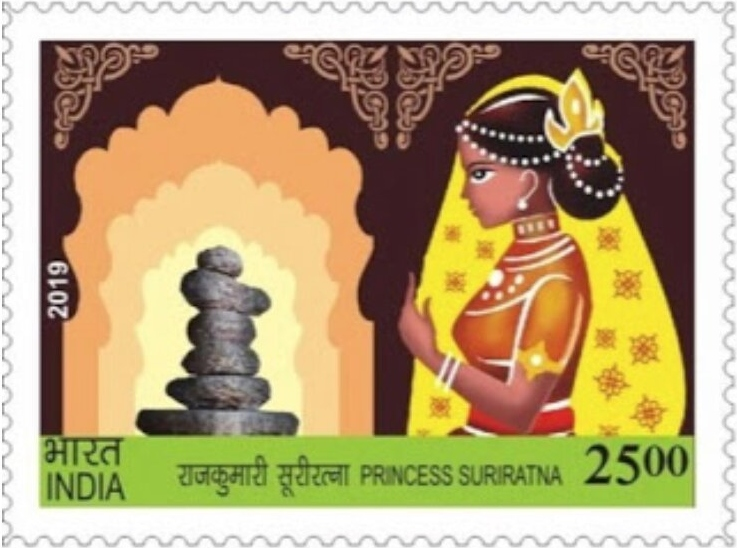
A commemorative Rs. 25.00 postage stamp of (Queen Heo Hwang-ok) was issued by India in 2019.

After their marriage, Heo told King Suro that she was 16 years old. She stated her given name as "Hwang-ok" ("Yellow Jade", 황옥, 黃玉) and her family name as "Heo" (허, or "Hurh" 許). She described how she came to Kaya as follows: the Heavenly Lord (Sange Je) appeared in her parents' dreams. He told them to send Heo to Suro, who had been chosen as the king of Kaya. The dream showed that the king had not yet found a queen. Heo's father then told her to go to Suro. After two months of a sea journey, she found Beondo, a peach which fruited only every 3.000 years.

According to the legend, the courtiers of King Suro had requested him to select a wife from among the maidens they would bring to the court. However, Suro stated that his selection of a wife will be commanded by the Heavens. He commanded Yuch'ŏn-gan to take a horse and a boat to Mangsan-do, an island to the south of the capital. At Mangsan, Yuch'ŏn saw a vessel with a red sail and a red flag. He sailed to the vessel, and escorted it to the shores of Kaya (present-day Gimhae). Another officer, Sin'gwigan went to the palace, and informed the King of the vessel's arrival. The King sent nine clan chiefs, asking them to escort the ship's passengers to the royal palace.

Princess Heo stated that she wouldn't accompany the strangers. Accordingly, the King ordered a tent to be pitched on the slopes of a hill near the palace. The princess then arrived at the tent with her courtiers and slaves. The courtiers included Sin Po (or Sin Bo, 신보, 申輔) and Cho Kwang (or Jo Gwang, 조광, 趙匡). Their wives were Mojong (모정, 慕貞) and Moryang (모량, 慕良) respectively. The twenty slaves carried gold, silver, jewels, silk brocade, and tableware and gems. Before marrying the king, the princess took off her silk trousers and offered them to the mountain spirit. King Suro tells her that he also knew about Heo's arrival in advance, and therefore, did not marry the maidens recommended by his courtiers.

When some of the Queen's escorts decided to return home, King Suro gave each of them thirty rolls of hempen cloth (one roll was of 40 yards). He also gave each person ten bags of rice for the return voyage. A part of the Queen's original convoy, including the two courtiers and their wives, stayed back with her. The queen was given a residence in the inner palace, while the two courtiers and their wives were given separate residences. The rest of her convoy were given a guest house of twenty rooms.

== Descendants ==
Allegedly, more than six million present-day Koreans, especially from Gimhae Kim, Gimhae Heo and Incheon Yi clans, trace their lineage to the legendary queen as the direct descendants of her 12 children with King Suro.

She requested Suro to let two of the children bear her maiden surname. Legendary genealogical records trace the origins of the Gimhae Heo to these two children. The Gimhae Kims trace their origin to the other eight sons, and so does the Yi clan of Incheon. The remaining two children were daughters who were married respectively to a son of Talhae and a noble from Silla.

According to the Jilburam, the remaining sons are said to have followed in their maternal uncle Po-ok's footsteps and devoted themselves to Buddhist meditation. They were named Hyejin, Gakcho, Jigam, Deonggyeon, Dumu, Jeongheong and Gyejang.

Kim Yoon-ok, wife of former South Korean President Lee Myung-bak who is from the Gimhae Kim clan, stated that she traces her ancestry to the royal family.

== Remains at Gimhae tomb ==
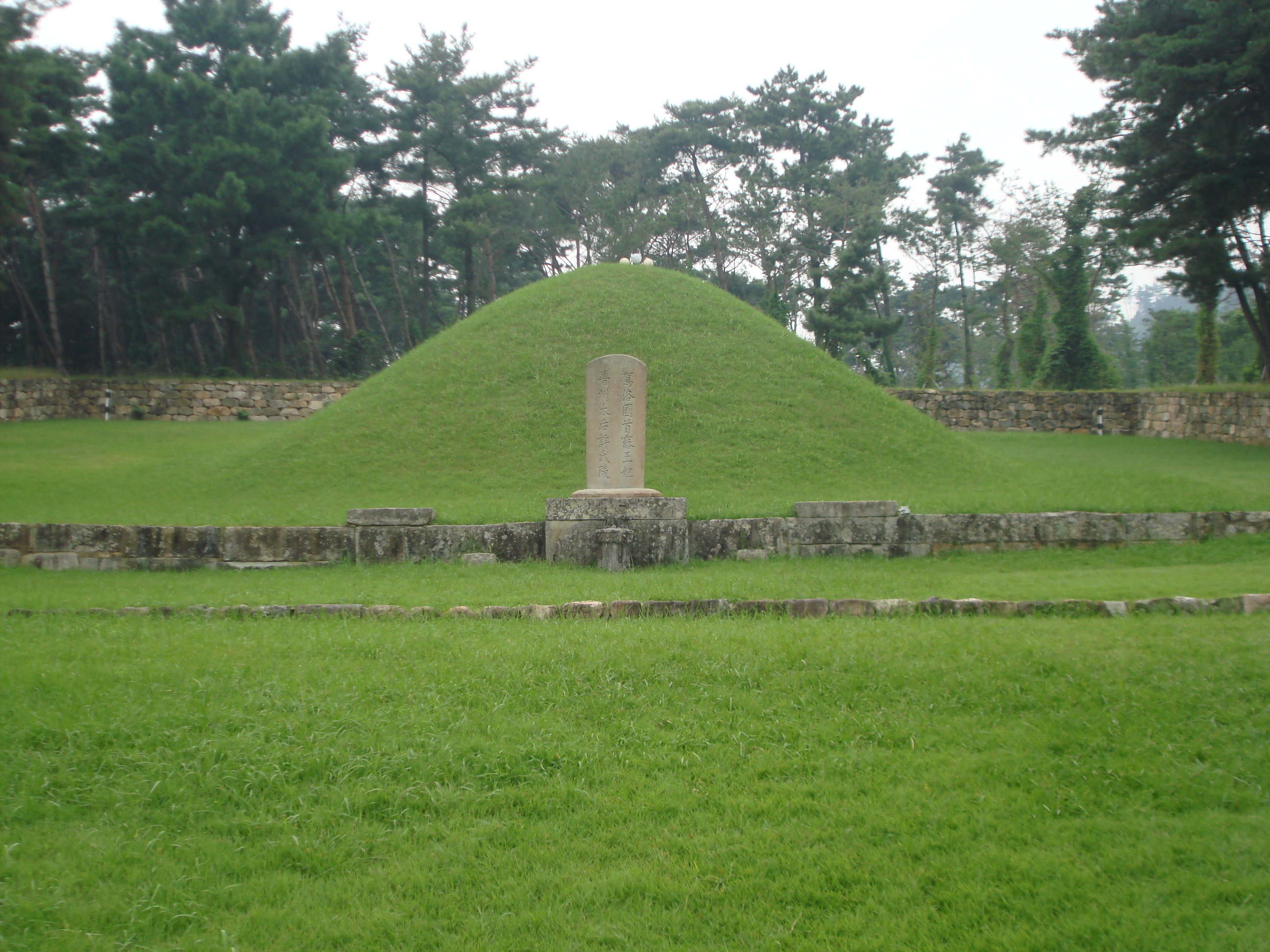
Queen Suro's Tomb (Queen Heo Hwang-ok) at Gimhae in Korea.

The tombs believed to be that of Heo Hwang-ok and Suro are located in Gimhae, South Korea. A pagoda traditionally held to have been brought to Korea on her ship is located near her grave. The Samguk yusa reports that the pagoda was erected on her ship in order to calm the god of the ocean and allow the ship to pass. The unusual and rough form of this pagoda, unlike any other in Korea, may lend some credence to the account.

A passage in the Samguk yusa indicates that King Jilji built a Buddhist temple for the ancestral Queen Heo on the spot where she and King Suro were married. He called the temple Wanghusa ("the Queen's temple") and provided it with ten gyeol of stipend land. A gyeol or kyŏl (결 or 結), varied in size from 2.2 acres to 9 acres (8,903–36,422 m2) depending upon the fertility of the land. The Samguk yusa also records that the temple was built in 452. Since there is no other record of Buddhism having been adopted in 5th-century Kaya, modern scholars have interpreted this as an ancestral shrine rather than a Buddhist temple.

== Memorial in Ayodhya ==
In 2001, a Memorial of Heo Hwang-ok was inaugurated by a Korean delegation, which included over a hundred historians and government representatives. In 2016, a Korean delegation proposed to develop the memorial. The proposal was accepted by then-Chief Minister of Uttar Pradesh, Akhilesh Yadav. On November 6, 2018, on the eve of Diwali celebration, South Korea's First Lady Kim Jung-sook, laid the foundation stone for the expansion and beautification of the existing memorial. She offered tribute at the Queen Heo Memorial, attended a ceremony for the upgrade and beautification of the memorial and attended an elaborate Diwali celebration at Ayodhya along with the present Chief Minister Yogi Adityanath, that included cultural shows and lighting of 300,000+ lights on the banks of Sarayu River.

Reportedly, hundreds of South Koreans visit Ayodhya every year to pay homage to their legendary Queen Heo Hwang-ok.

== Controversy surrounding her existence ==
Heo Hwang-ok's rather unique background had been a subject of much discussion in South Korea among many historians. Despite her legendary status and numerous theories, most academics reject the story of Queen Heo due to historical, archaeological, and genetical inconsistencies.

=== Historical evidence ===
The first criticism stems from the fact that her existence is solely based on the accounts made in Samguk yusa, a book that is widely regarded to be mostly fictional. Other older and more historically accurate sources such as the Samguk sagi lack mentions about an Indian princess arriving in Kaya and marrying the king. It is believed that the writer of Samguk yusa, Il-yeon exaggerated much of the claims to create a sense of familiarity towards Buddhism being a Buddhist monk himself. Scholars such as Kwang-soo Lee, a professor at Busan University of Foreign Studies of Indian history stated that due to the lack of technology to properly reach the Korean peninsula from ancient India at the time, her arrival would have been nearly impossible or at least, extremely difficult. Another major critique stems from the book Garakguk-gi itself. Being written during the Goryeo Dynasty (the same period of Samguk yusa's publication), the book claims multiple accounts that revolves around events that happened almost a millennium before the foundation of the Goryeo kingdom. In addition to Kwang-soo Lee's analysis, journalists such as Yang-jae Lee also stated that since Samguk yusa and Garakguk-gi are both second hand accounts written in the same time period, the cross-referencing needs to be carefully examined and researchers must remain skeptical.

The general consensus is that the probability of the existence of an Indian princess was highly unlikely and that much of the stories surrounding Heo Hwang-ok and King Suro found in Samguk yusa were fabricated for political and religious reasons in Kaya at the time. The book claims that King Suro lived up to 157 years old and transformed into an eagle and a hawk to fight off his rivals according to the supposed Garakguk-gi, making her story less probable stemming from the same source material. Analysts such as Dong-geun Im have theorized that Queen Heo truly existed not as a foreign Indian, but as a native Korean. His claim suggests that Garakgukgi (and in turn Samguk yusa) alludes to the deification of King Suro by aggrandizing much of his accomplishments and elevating him to that of the supernatural. For further context, the only King to be officially recognized as the longest reigning monarch of Korea was King Jangsu (literal translation of "Long Life King") who lived up to the age of 97, making King Suro's supposed age of death (and his other claims) even more controversial. In essence, it can be deduced that Queen Heo's Korean ethnicity was elevated to that of the Indian heritage to create a sense of uniqueness since marrying a royal princess from India, the birthplace of Buddha and Buddhism would be considered as a major accomplishment for the king of a Buddhist nation.

Il-yeon's exaggerations found in Samguk yusa are often scrutinized by modern analysts such as professor Hyun-sul Cho at the Seoul National University of Korean literature for falsely labelling royals (especially female individuals) of past Korean kingdoms as foreigners. For the same reason, Cho heavily questioned Il-yeon's integrity and motives, and considered it to be one of the biggest reasons why the book is considered less credible than Samguk sagi. In addition to Queen Heo, Il-yeon also knowingly mislabeled Lady Saso of being Chinese in his book (when in reality she was from Buyeo), a baseless claim postulated by a Chinese guide, "Wang Fu (王黼)" that was intentionally dismissed by Kim Pusik (the author of Samguk sagi and the first to have heard this rumor) during his visit to the Song dynasty which Il-yeon took note after looking into Kim's posthumous records over five decades later and had it published in his own Samguk yusa.

A more recent analysis posits that the queen did not come from India, but rather, Western China (such as Tibet) or Central Asia. According to Hwa-seob Song (2024), a professor at Chung-Ang University, the Samguk yusa clearly labels India under "Cheonchuk-guk (天竺國; 천축국)" or "Cheonchuk Kingdom", and called Indians as "Cheonchuk-in (天竺人; 천축인)" meaning "Cheonchuk people". Song claims that the passage where the queen is first mentioned implies a different origin, something that is not inherently South Asian. According to the Samguk yusa, it states that Queen Heo came from the kingdom "Ayuta" found in the "Seoyeok" region (西域 阿踰陀國; Seoyeok Ayutaguk); as India is already claimed under "Cheonchuk", he states that "Seoyeok (lit. 'Western region')" indicates a western province from the perspective of Korea, a Northeast Asian country, which would likely point to somewhere near Tibet. Song also postulated that if not Tibet, it would likely have been an Uyghur nation that is closer to Central Asia.

=== Archaeological evidence ===
Other criticisms point to the reason behind her supposed journey to the Korean kingdom being too vague. Historians such as Ki-hwan Lee admit that the influence of India and Buddhism was profound for ancient Korean kingdoms at the time as many of them treated artifacts originating from India to be sacred. However, other historians such as Kwang-soo Lee have also stated that the agency of an Indian princess coming to Korea across the sea on a boat was very peculiar as ancient Korea was less known to India than countries such as ancient China. Ki-hwan Lee suggested that the story of Heo Hwang-ok was dramatized to elevate Gaya's stature of the Buddhist scene among the Korean kingdoms and to associate the sacred artifacts they possessed to something closer to that of the Indian culture.

Recent excavations led by Professor Byung-mo Kim at Hanyang University in 2018 discovered that the evidence which allegedly proved the existence of Queen Heo such as the famous relic resembling a pair of fish that was carved onto the tomb's gate, originated from Babylon rather than Ayuta, further discrediting the possibilities of the queen being more than just a religious symbol. He added that despite much efforts to find any substantial evidence that linked the relics to Queen Heo's possible existence, the sheer commonness of the relics being found across all of Asia (starting from present-day Iraq to the Japanese archipelago), he concluded that the relics did not originate from ancient India, but rather the aforementioned ancient Babylon. Professor Kim added that engraving a depiction of a pair of fish was an ancient ritual stemming from a Babylonian belief that was thought to have brought eternal prosperity and marital happiness to the individuals who were blessed.

=== DNA evidence ===
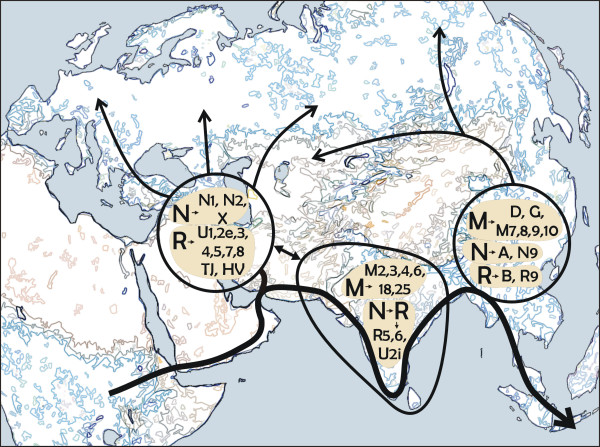
Distribution of Haplogroup M strand around the world.

In 2004, a research team in Korea conducted a genetic analysis into the remains of the supposed descendants of King Suro and Queen Heo. According to the study, Haplogroup M, a haplogroup that is found predominantly in people from the southern regions in Asia was found. The research team claimed that the remains of the tombs possessed the Haplogroup M7 family, the same haplogroup which is passed on through maternal lineages that could be found in the Middle East, South Asia and East Asia. They stated that modern Koreans in general possessed at most around 5% of this DNA while the remains found in the tombs had a much higher frequency of it, thus supporting the idea that the descendants could trace their origins to a foreign lineage including that of India, aligning with the story found in Samguk yusa. However, the head of the research team, Jong-il Kim also mentioned that the haplogroup demographic was too large to locate a specific origin and was cautious as to definitively claiming that the remains were truly of Indian origin as it is a common haplogroup found in populations closer to the Southern Hemisphere. They stated that additional examination was needed in the future to draw a conclusive argument.

Almost two decades later in 2022, further research was conducted as to the origins of the Korean people, where a study discovered that the Korean peninsula included many ethnic groups during its ancient times, specifically during the Three Kingdoms period. According to the study, Korea was mostly occupied by people originating from Northern China (Manchuria and Siberia) but also had native people from the south that bore close resemblance to the Jōmon people of Japan who had inhabited the peninsula before the northern population (Yayoi people and Yemaek people) arrived and displaced them. Researchers pointed out that this ethnic group was mostly the ruling members of the Kaya confederacy and had a profound impact in both language and culture within the region (see Peninsular Japonic).

The MtDNA Haplogroup found in the Jōmon people is characterized by the presence of Haplogroup M7a (a branch haplogroup that is part of the bigger M7 strand). It can be deduced that the remains used in the research conducted in 2004 were most likely royals of the Kaya confederacy who bore genetic resemblance to the Jōmon population. Thus, the reason for the discovery of the M7 haplogroup in their tombs and the researchers concluding a foreign origin was proposed.

Due to the existence of M7 haplogroup found in the remains, it can be theorized that Heo Hwang-ok may be related to ancient Jōmon populations. According to a 2017 study published in Scientific Advances by the University of Cambridge and Ulsan National Institute of Science and Technology (UNIST), "the type of mitochondria genome found in the Devil's Gate Cave people is nearly the same as that found in Koreans. You could say the cave people are almost like the ancestors of Koreans." said Jeon Seong-won, the lead researcher of the project. According to the study, the Devil's Gate Cave's remains are closely related to Jōmon D4 and M haplogroups. In fact, Devil's Gate Cave is located in the land of ancient Korean kingdoms such as Dongbuyeo (Eastern Buyeo), Okjeo, and Goguryeo, which the evidence hints that Jōmon ancestry has close relation to that of early inhabitants of Korea. Such abundance of M7 haplogroup found in Heo Hwang-ok's relatives' remains may signify a likely case that she came from the earliest traces of Jōmon ancestry, namely the progeny of Devil's Gate Cave (Chertovy Vorota Cave) inhabitants in Dongbuyeo. It also coincides with the fact that within the Samguk yusa, the boat Heo Hwang-ok arrived in "darted like an arrow," is representative of Goguryeo warfare arsenal as the sail and flag were colored red, similar to Goguryeo's military colors, and a courtier's name was Sinpo, which is the name of a North Korean city on the eastern coast of present-day Goguryeo.

Despite the historical, archaeological and genealogical inaccuracies surrounding her existence, many Korean historians stated that her iconic image as a legendary figure should persist as a means for the two countries to remain on good terms.

== In popular culture ==
- Portrayed by Seo Ji-hye in the 2010 MBC TV series Kim Su-ro, The Iron King.
- In February 2019, India and Korea signed an agreement on releasing a joint stamp, commemorating Queen Heo Hwang-ok.
- Indian Council for Cultural Relations is releasing book that includes contact between foreign cultures and India, which mentions the story of Queen Heo Hwang-ok.
- The 2026 Netflix feature film Made in Korea makes a reference to the legend.

== See also ==
- Lady Saso
- Three Kingdoms of Korea
- Buddhist temples in South Korea
- Geumgwan Gaya
- Byeonhan confederacy
- Indians in Korea
- Koreans in India
- India–South Korea relations
- India–North Korea relations
- Korean mythology
