= Heo Im =

Korean acupuncturist (1570–1647)

- Hangul: 허임
- Hanja: 許任
- RR: Heo Im
- MR: Hŏ Im

Heo Im (Korean: 허임; Hanja: 許任; 1570–1647, born in Naju, South Jeolla Province) was a Korean acupuncturist of the Hayang Heo clan during the reign of King Seonjo of the Joseon period. Heo was known for his contribution to the development of acupuncture. His father, Heo Eok-bok (허억복) was a commoner from Yangyang and he was well known for his ability to work with flute and as a vocalist. His mother was a noble, the 7th descendant of Heo Jo (許租,허조) who was the civil minister during the reign of King Sejong. In 1609, he received a decree and was appointed to the office of the Majeun Military Commander, but this was then opposed by the Ministry of Social Welfare because of Im's status as a commoner. Prince Gwanghae did not give attention at first, but when the servants went back, they eventually took the position of the military commander and ordered him to pay a bonus. In 1612, when Prince Gwanghae was in the Haeju province, his name was recorded as the prize for his achievement. He was recorded in the "History of the People" (의관록) with the names of those who were named as doctors along with Heo Jun. In 1616, he was appointed to the Yeongpyong City (永平縣令). In the following year, he became a local governor of Yangju. In 1622, he came to the position of advisor at Namyang.

== Works ==
- Book of Acupuncture and Moxibustion Experience (鍼灸經驗方,침구경험방), 1644
- Book of the Eastern Medicine (東醫聞見方,동의문견방)

== In popular culture ==
=== Films and television ===
- Portrayed by Kim Nam-gil in the 2017 tvN TV series Live Up to Your Name.

== See also ==
- Heo Jun
- Acupuncture
