= Sri Lakshmi Narayanan Temple =

Hindu temple in Seoul, South Korea

Sri Lakshmi Narayanan Temple is a Hindu temple in Seoul, South Korea.

== See also ==
- Hinduism in Korea
