= Bokyem =

South Korean YouTuber (born 1988)

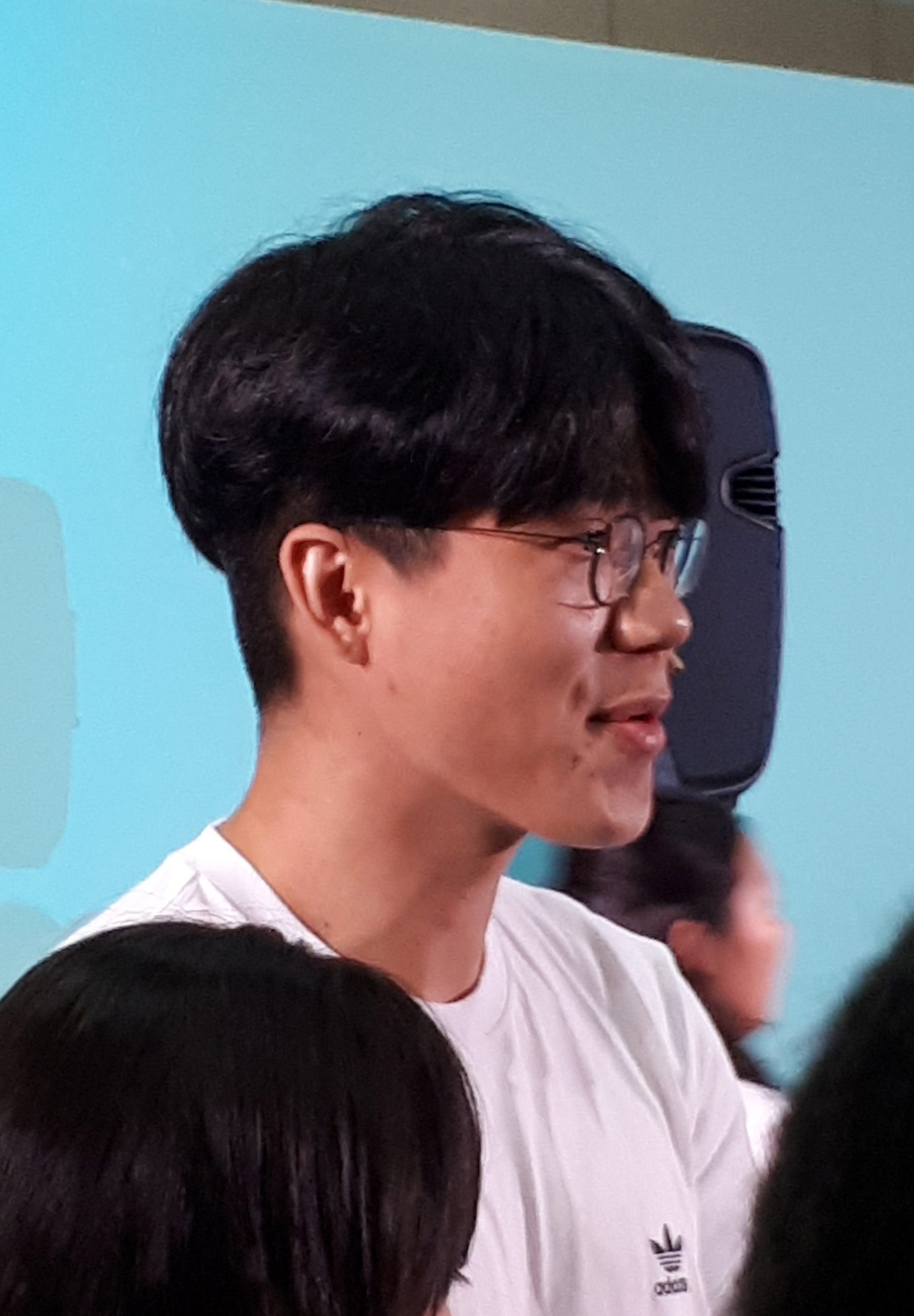
- Bokyem of 2019
- Born: January 31, 1988 (age 38); Seocheon County, Chungcheongnam-do, South Korea
- Other name: BK
- Occupations: YouTuber, BJ
- Years active: 2012–Current
- Known for: YouTube

Kim Bo-kyem (Korean: 김보겸; Hanja: 金𤣰謙, born January 31, 1988), known by his YouTube channel name Bokyem (보겸), is a South Korean YouTuber and streamer on afreecaTV.

As of June 2020, the number of subscribers to the YouTube channel operated by Bokyem was 4.03 million, and it was the number one in the list of subscribers when limited to the Korean game YouTuber channel.

== Early life ==
Bokyem was born on January 31, 1988, in Seocheon-gun, Chungcheongnam-do.

Bokyem started the afreecaTV BJ in 2012 while attending Kunsan National University. In 2014, Bokyem started working on YouTube, and he has uploaded game videos.

In 2016, Bokyem also uploaded Mukbang and daily videos, increasing the number of YouTube subscribers. Most of the viewers were in their teens.

Since 2017, Bokyem has been broadcasting jointly with other BJs in Korea. And in 2019, he released a music album at melon with 'Ellin', one of the members of Crayon Pop.

In July 2020, the number of subscribers reached 4.03 million, and after that, Bokyem changed the number of subscribers to private. In August, it is estimated that the number of subscribers decreased due to controversy among many Korean YouTubers including Bokyem.

== Awards ==
- STAR BJ 20 for 2014 Africa TV BJ Awards
- 2015 Africa TV BJ Awards STAR BJ 20
- 2016 Intel Overwatch APEX season 1 semifinals (BK Stars)
- BJ 50/ THE 20/ TOP 5 / KT GiGA BMF/ BJ Grand Prize for Africa TV in 2016
- 2017 Africa TV BJ Grand Prize Grand Prize in the comprehensive game category
- 2018 Asia Model Awards Creator of the Year Award
- 2018 Africa TV BJ Awards
- 2019 Africa TV BJ Grand Prize Single-Person Media Icon Award

== Incident and controversy ==
In 2018, members of the Korean male-hating community website Womad claimed distortedly that Bokyem's greeting word, 'Boiru'(Korean: 보이루), was a misogynistic word. They said that 'Bo' in 'Boiru' means Cunt.

So, Bokyem said he will take legal action against members of Womad he claims to be a disparaging expression for Women.

The court ruled that Bo-Gyeom's 'Boiru'(Korean: 보이루) had no sexual meaning and ruled that Yoon Ji-sun was compensated 50 million won.
