= Gimhae Kim clan =

Largest Korean clan

- Current region: Gimhae
- Founder: Kim Suro

The Gimhae Kim clan (Korean: 김해 김씨; Hanja: 金海 金氏) is one of the Yangban (aristocrat) Korean clan, descended from Suro of Geumgwan Gaya. King Suro was the founder of Gaya confederacy, and his descendant, Kim Yu-sin is renowned for leading the Silla armies to unify the Three Kingdoms of Korea.

More than six million present day Koreans, especially from Gimhae Kim, Heo and Lee (Yi) clans associate their bon-gwan (geo-biological lineage roots) to Gimhae, in the South Gyeongsang Province of South Korea, and these clans place restrictions on marriage with each other due to the shared ancestors. Today, the Gimhae Kim clan is the largest clan group among them. Also, it is the largest clan group in South Korea. The Gimhae Kim and Gimhae Heo clans, descend from the two sons of King Suro where the latter used their mother, Queen Heo Hwang-ok's surname, instead of their father's.

One of the dominant branch of Gimhae Kim clan is Samhyunpa-branch.

== Origin ==
The Gimhae Kim clan's founder, according to legend, was Kim Suro, whose wife was the legendary Queen Heo Hwang-ok. Heo Hwang-ok bore 12 children. According to the Samguk Sagi, Kim Yu-sin was the 12th descendant of Suro.

== History ==
The Gimhae Kim clan experienced extreme shifts in political prominence, peaking in power through royal intermarriage during Silla and Goryeo, but facing severe decline in the Joseon dynasty due to political purges and lingering loyalty to the previous regime. Middle Progenitor Kim Yu-sin: Kim Yu-sin was the great-grandson of Guhyeong of Geumgwan Gaya, the last king of Geumgwan Gaya. As a brilliant general (Korean:명장), he achieved the great task of unifying the Three Kingdoms of Korea alongside King Muyeol of Silla. He married Lady Jiso (King Muyeol's daughter), reached the highest official rank of Taedaegakgan (Korean:태대각간], and was posthumously honored as King Heungmu (Korean:흥무대왕), becoming the middle progenitor of the Gimhae Kim clan. In addition, the Gimhae Kim clan stele in Jinju is a historical structure built to protect commemorative steles associated with members of the Gimhae Kim clan.

=== Silla Dynasty, Rise and Fall ===
Through intermarriage with the Silla royal family, the clan was treated exceptionally well as aristocrats and flourished. However, when King Hyegong of Silla was assassinated, and the Muyeol royal line ended, the clan was alienated by other aristocrats and even demoted to Yukdupum (Head Rank Six of the Jingol, Silla's aristocratic ranking).

=== Goryeo Dynasty, Resurgence ===
The clan wielded great power as a premier family (Korean: 삼한갑족 三韓甲族), producing distinguished civil and military officials. In the Goryeo period alone, they produced 15 state councilors, over 10 meritorious officials, 8 generals, and 11 top scholars.

=== Joseon Dynasty, Decline ===
Upon entering the Joseon era, many clan members remained loyal to Goryeo and opposed Joseon's founding. They became embroiled in political incidents such as the Muo Literati Purge (Korean: 무오사화) and suffered decline. Among successive state councilors, Kim U-hang (Korean: 김우항) during King Sukjong's reign was the sole representative from the clan.

== Royalty ==
=== Silla Royalty ===
- Queen Munmyeong (문명왕후), wife of Muyeol of Silla, sister of Kim Yu-sin, mother of Munmu
- Kim Po-hui (김보희; 金寶姬), Lady Yeonchang (영창부인), concubine of Muyeol of Silla

=== Joseon ===
- Royal Noble Consort Gong Bin Kim (공빈 김씨), concubine of Seonjo of Joseon and mother of Gwanghaegun of Joseon
- Royal Consort Suk-ui Kim (숙의 김씨), concubine of Heonjong of Joseon and mother of his only kwon child
- Royal Consort Suk-ui Kim (숙의 김해김씨), concubine of Cheoljong of Joseon and mother of two daughters

== Notable people ==
- Andrew Kim Taegon (1821–1846), Korean Catholic saint
- Kim Hong-do (1745–c. 1806), Joseon painter
- Bokyem (born Kim Bo-kyem, 1988), South Korean YouTuber
- Kim Boo-kyum (born 1958), South Korean politician
- Kim Dae-jung (1924–2009), South Korean politician
- Gong Myung (born Kim Dong-hyun, 1994), South Korean actor
- Doyoung (singer) (born Kim Dong-young, 1996), South Korean singer, member of boy band NCT
- B.I (rapper) (born Kim Han-bin, 1996), South Korean rapper
- Bibi (singer) (born Kim Hyeong-seo, 1998), South Korean singer
- Kim Hyong-uk (1925–1979), South Korean brigadier
- Chuu (born Kim Ji-woo, 1999), South Korean singer
- Chen (singer) (born Kim Jong-dae, 1992), South Korean singer
- Kim Jong-hwan (1924 - 2022), South Korean military officer and politician
- Kim Jong-hyun (born 1990–2017), South Korean singer
- Kim Jong-pil (1926–2018), South Korean politician
- Yesung (born Kim Jong-woon, 1984), South Korean singer
- Kim Kang-hoon (born 2009), South Korean actor
- Winter (singer) (born Kim Min-jeong, 2001), South Korean singer, member of girl group aespa
- Xiumin (born Kim Min-seok, 1990), South Korean singer
- Kim Moo-sung (born 1950), South Korean politician
- Kim Mu-ryeok (518–579), Silla general
- Kim Seul-gi (born 1991), South Korean actress
- Seungmin (born Kim Seungmin, 2000), South Korean singer, member of boy band Stray Kids
- Kim Ung-seo (1564–1624), Joseon general
- Kim Won-bong (1898–1958), Korean independence activist
- Kim Yu-sin (595–673), Silla general and politician
- Jin Longguo (born 1996), Chinese singer
- Sunoo (born Kim Seonwoo, 2003), South Korean singer, and member of boy band ENHYPEN
- Kim So-won (born Kim So-jeong,1995), South Korean actress and singer, and member of girl group GFRIEND
- Umji (born Kim Ye-won, 1998), South Korean actress and singer, and member of girl groups GFRIEND and VIVIZ
- Kim Gyuvin (born 2004), South Korean singer, and member of boy band ZEROBASEONE
- Liz (born Kim Jiwon, 2004), South Korean singer, and member of girl group IVE
- Kim Junseo (born 2001), South Korean singer, and member of boy bands WEi and ALPHADRIVEONE
- Kim Geonwoo (born 2003), South Korean singer, and member of boy band ALPHADRIVEONE
- Kim Juhoon (born 2008), South Korean singer, and member of boy band CORTIS
