= India–North Korea relations =

- India: North Korea

Diplomatic mission
- Embassy of India, Pyongyang: Embassy of North Korea, New Delhi

Envoy
- Ambassador Aliawati Longkumer: Ambassador Choe Hui Chol

India–North Korea relations (Korean: 인디아-조선민주주의 인민공화국 관계), also called Indian-North Korean relations or Indo-North Korean relations, are the bilateral relations between the Republic of India and Democratic People's Republic of Korea. Both countries have growing diplomatic relations. India maintains an embassy in Pyongyang, and North Korea has an embassy in New Delhi.

India was one of North Korea's biggest trade partners and a major food aid provider. According to CII, India's exports to North Korea in 2013 totaled more than US$60 million.

As of 2012, India maintained that any peaceful agreement between North Korea and South Korea will be strongly endorsed. India has also cleared that it wants the reunification of Korea. According to 2014 BBC World Service Poll, 23% of Indians view North Korea's worldly influence positively, with 27% expressing a negative view.

In 2017, India implemented the United Nations Security Council economic sanctions and ceased most trade with North Korea. In 2022, India condemned North Korea's launching of intercontinental ballistic missiles.

== History ==
=== Pre-modern relations ===
According to the 13th century chronicle Samguk Yusa, the ancient Korean queen Heo Hwang-ok came from a kingdom called "Ayuta". Different theories identifies Ayuta as Ayodhya or Kanyakumari in India.

A Korean visitor to India was Hyecho, a Korean Buddhist monk from Silla, one of the three Korean kingdoms of the period. On the advice of his Indian teachers in China, he set out for India in 723 CE to acquaint himself with the language and Indian culture. He wrote a travelogue of his journey in Chinese, Wang ocheonchukguk jeon or "An account of travel to the five Indian kingdoms". The work was long thought to be lost. However, a manuscript turned up among the Dunhuang manuscripts during the early 20th century.

A rich merchant from the Ma'bar Sultanate, Abu Ali (P'aehali) 孛哈里 (or 布哈爾 Buhaer), was associated closely with the Ma'bar royal family. After falling out with them, he moved to Yuan dynasty China and received a Korean woman as his wife and a job from the Mongol Emperor, the woman was formerly 桑哥 Sangha's wife and her father was 蔡仁揆 채송년 Ch'ae In'gyu during the reign of 忠烈 Chungnyeol of Goryeo, recorded in the Dongguk Tonggam, Goryeosa and 留夢炎 Liu Mengyan's 中俺集 Zhong'anji. 桑哥 Sangha was a Tibetan.

Rabindranath Tagore's poem 'Lamp of the East 'composed in 1929 speaks about the glorious past and bright future of Korea. This poem is popular even today:

"In the golden age of Asia, Korea was one of its lamp bearers and
That lamp is waiting to be lighted once again for the illumination in the East"

=== Korean War ===
India condemned North Korea as an aggressor when the Korean War started, supporting Security Council resolutions 82 and 83 on the crisis. However, India did not support resolution 84 for military assistance to South Korea. As a non-aligned country, India hesitated to involve itself in a military commitment against North Korea. Instead, India gave its moral support for the UN action and decided to send a medical unit to Korea as a humanitarian gesture. The 60th Indian Field Ambulance Unit, a unit of the Indian Airborne Division, was selected to be dispatched to Korea. The unit consisted of 346 men including 14 doctors.

India was chair of the 9-member UN Commission that monitored elections in undivided Korea in 1947. After the Korean War, India again played an important role as the chair of the Neutral Nations Repatriation Commission in the Korean peninsula.

=== Recent relations ===
Consular relations were created on 1 March 1962, and The Consulate General of India in the DPRK was established in October 1968. An Indian Embassy in Pyongyang was established on 10 December 1973. Both states are members of the Non-Aligned Movement, underlining a common view on many international issues. India makes efforts to engage in dialogue to support peace and stability in Korea and tries to act as a bridge between North Korea and the Western world.

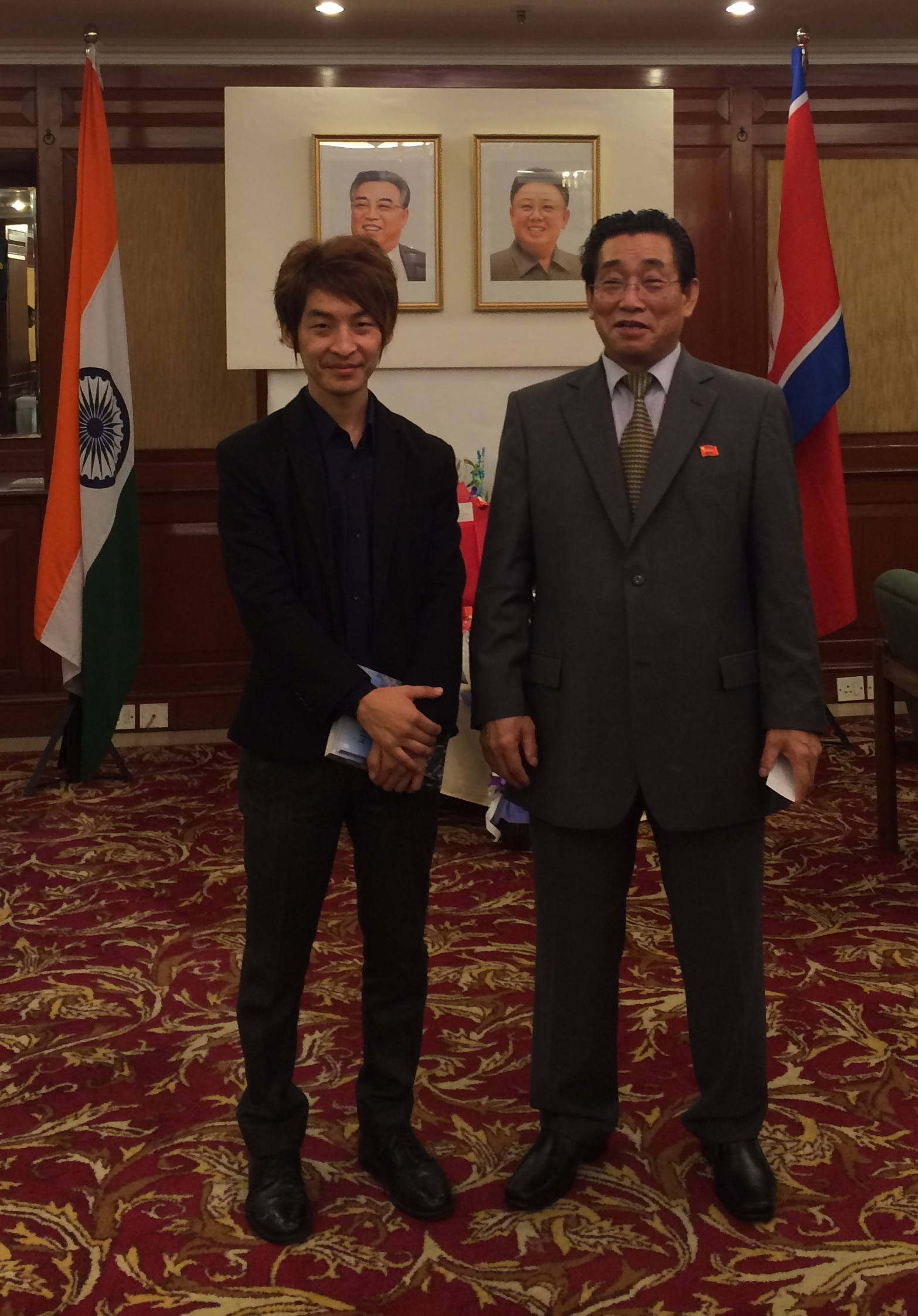
Ambassador Gye Chun Yong

India's relationship with North Korea has however been affected by North Korean relations with Pakistan especially due to its help for Pakistan's nuclear missile programme. In 1999, India impounded a North Korean ship off the Kandla coast that was found to be carrying missile components and blueprints. India's relations with South Korea have far greater economic and technological depth and India's keenness for South Korean investments and technology have in turn affected its relations with the North adversely. India has consistently voiced its opposition to North Korean nuclear and missile tests.

As a consequence of United Nations Security Council economic sanctions, with effect from 7 March 2019, Indian citizens can not undertake capital account transactions with North Korean citizens. Also Indian Government has asked the existing investment transactions to be liquidated within a period of 180 days from the date of notification.

In July 2021, India temporarily closed its embassy in Pyongyang due to COVID-19 restrictions and the Indian ambassador to North Korea, Atul Gotsurve left North Korea on a special train via the North Korea–Russia border. It was reopened in December 2024.

In September 2022, India condemned the launching of Intercontinental Ballistic Missiles by North Korea in a joint statement shared with the countries such as the United States, Japan, the United Kingdom and others.

== Economic relations ==
=== Trade ===
Trade between India and North Korea reached an average total of about $10 million in the middle of the 2000s; it shot up to $60 million in 2013. The trade is overwhelmingly in India's favor, with its exports accounting for roughly $60 million while North Korean exports to India were worth $36 million. India's primary export to North Korea is refined petroleum products while silver and auto parts are the main components of its imports from North Korea. India participated in the sixth Pyongyang Autumn International Trade Fair in October 2010 and there have been efforts to bring about greater economic cooperation and trade between the two countries since then. In 2010–11, Indo-North Korean trade stood at $57 million with India's exports accounting for $32 million. Due to UNSC sanctions resolutions, trade except food and medicine, with DPRK with effect from April 2017 is restricted. The bilateral trade has declined considerably due to India's participation in UN sanctions.

=== Food aid ===
In 2002 and 2004, India contributed 2000 tonnes of food grains to help North Korea tide over severe famine-like conditions. In 2010, India responded to North Korea's request for food aid and made available to it 1300 tonnes of pulses and wheat worth $1 million through the UN World Food Programme. India has contributed $1 million to the World Food Programme for its humanitarian activities in North Korea in the year 2019, the UN agency's monthly report released in November 2019 showed this, as the impoverished North struggles to cope with chronic food shortages. "WFP has intensified the South-South and Triangular cooperation as an avenue to enhance support to the DPRK and has received a contribution from the Government of India of $1 million for its in-country operations," the report said.

=== Medical aid ===
The Indian government sent $1 million worth of anti-tuberculosis medicine to North Korea per a request from the World Health Organization (WHO), according to a press release issued by the Indian embassy in Pyongyang. "The medical assistance is under the aegis of WHO's ongoing anti-tuberculosis (TB) program in the DPRK," the press release stated. The aid package was handed over to North Korean authorities by the Indian ambassador to the DPRK, Atul Malhari Gotsurve. The supply of anti-tuberculosis medicine, which is India's latest set of humanitarian assistance to North Korea — was sent because "India is sensitive to the shortage of medical supply" to the DPRK, the embassy stated.

== See also ==
- Heo Hwang-ok, the Indian Queen of 48 CE Korea
- Memorial of Heo Hwang-ok, Ayodhya, India.
- Foreign relations of India
- Foreign relations of North Korea
- Foreign relations of South Korea
- India – South Korea relations
- History of Korea
- Hinduism in Korea
- Koreans in India
- Indians in Korea
- Pyongyang International Film Festival, where Indian films have regularly participated
