= Memorial of Heo Hwang-ok, Ayodhya =

Monument in Uttar Pradesh, India

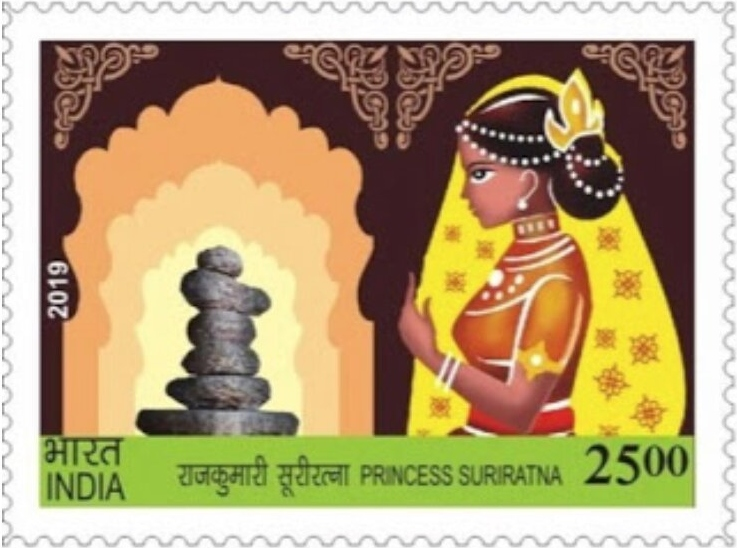
A commemorative Rs. 25.00 postage stamp on Princess Suriratna (Queen Heo Hwang-ok) was issued by India in 2019.

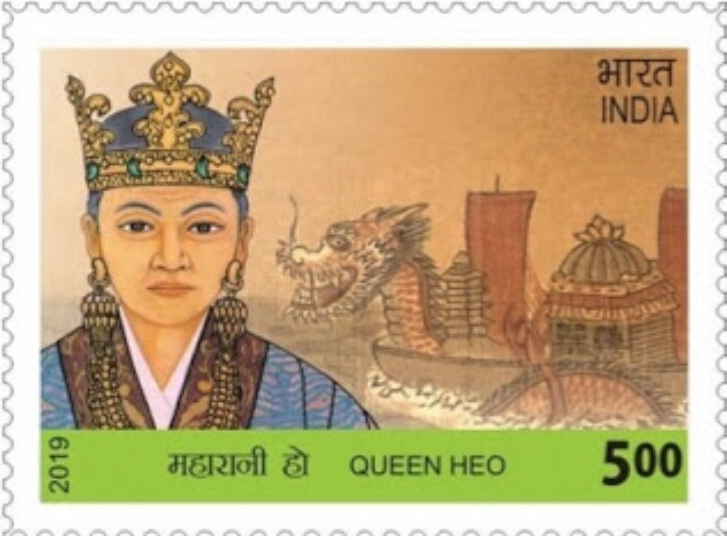
A commemorative Rs. 5.00 postage stamp on Queen Heo Hwang-ok (Princess Suriratna) was issued by India in 2019.

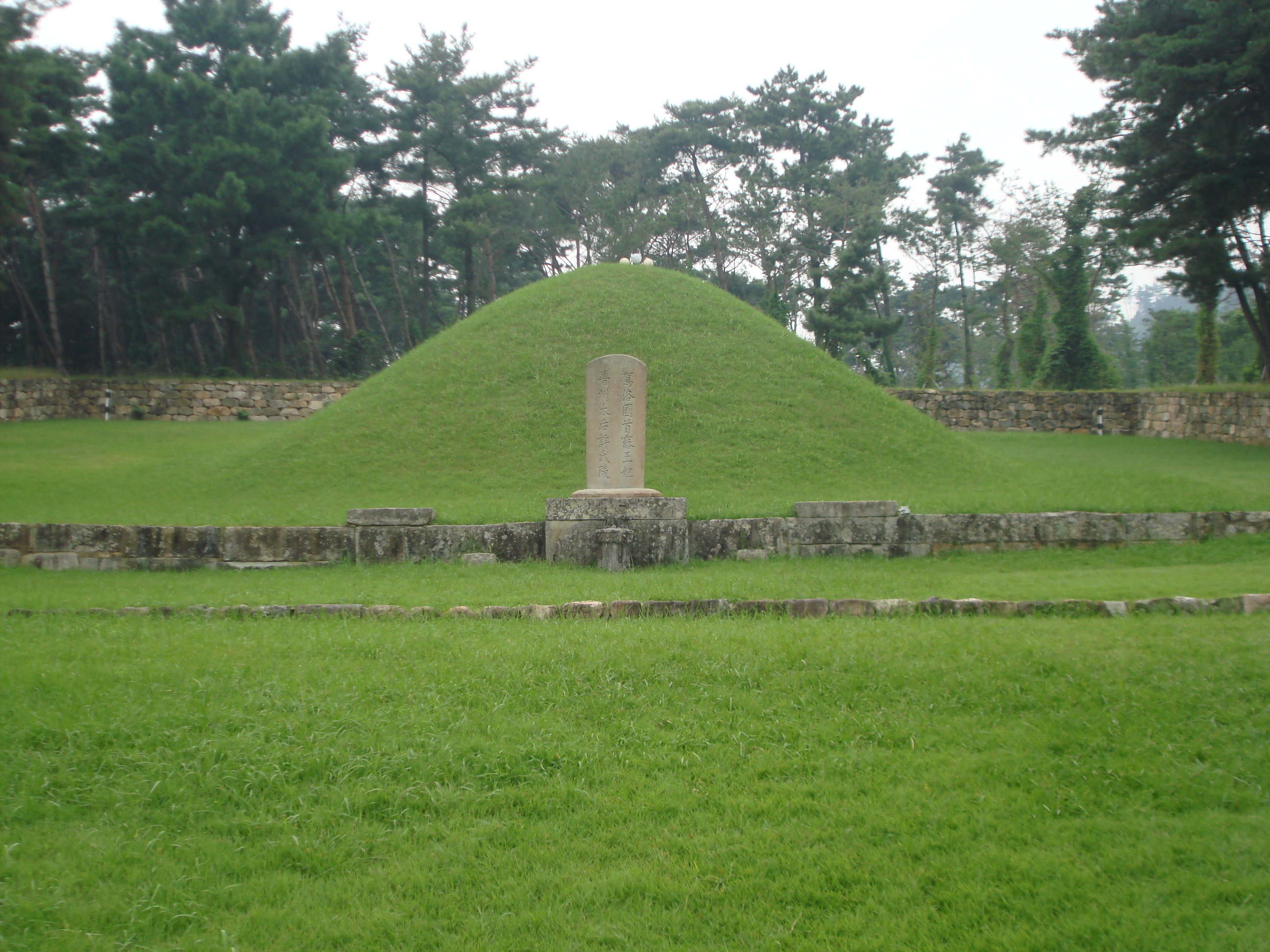
Queen Heo Hwang-ok's tomb (Queen of King Suro) in Ghimhae, South Korea.

A memorial of the Korean Queen Heo Hwang-ok is located in Ram Katha Park, near the ghats, on Sarayu River, in the holy Hindu city of Ayodhya, in Uttar Pradesh. The stone memorial, with an inscription of the legend of Queen Heo, sits inside a park. Planned upgrades featuring Korean and Indian architectural elements and landscaping, including a traditional pavilion, are expected to be completed in 2 years by the end of 2020 at the cost of INR 30 million.

Queen Heo's tomb is situated in Gimhae City, South Gyeongsang Province, South Korea.

== History ==
Heo Hwang-ok is a legendary Queen, wife of King Suro, and the first queen of Geumgwan Gaya, mentioned in the 13th-century chronicle Samguk Yusa. She is said to have come to Geumgwan Gaya from Ayuta. Based on speculative identification of Ayuta with Ayodhya because of phonetic similarities, she is asserted to be of Indian origin though the location of Ayuta is disputed by some scholars as the Ay kingdom (modern day Kanyakumari), a vassal to the Pandyas of Tamilakam.

In 2001, a Korean delegation, which included the North Korean ambassador to India, inaugurated a memorial stone dedicated to her in Ayodhya. The legend of Queen Heo is inscribed on the stone memorial in Korean and English. The park which surrounds the memorial is colloquial called "Korea Park". The monument was built in Korean traditional style, using a 3m high and 7,500 kg heavy stone shipped from Korea.

In March 2016, a 38-member South Korean delegation made a proposal to develop the memorial further. The proposal was accepted by the Chief Minister of Uttar Pradesh, Akhilesh Yadav. In July, the two countries had signed an agreement regarding the Queen Suriratna Memorial Project to facilitate upgrade and expansion of the existing monument commemorating Princess Suriratna (Queen Heo Hwang-ok). The regional tourism office of India released ₹30 million for the development of the memorial. It was decided that South Korean architects will survey the land, and prepare an action plan. In May 2017, during the Indian Prime Minister Narendra Modi's visit to Seoul, a decision was taken to upgrade the monument as a joint project between India and South Korea. On November 6, 2018 on the eve of Deepavali celebration, South Korea's First Lady Kim Jung-sook laid the foundation stone for the expansion and beautification of the existing memorial.

Since a large number of Koreans trace their ancestry to Heo Hwang-ok, hundreds of South Korean tourists visit Ayodhya every year to pay tributes to their Queen, especially around jesa, in April.

== Sister City Agreement between Ayodhya and Gimhae ==
Based on formal Korean Governmental approval, the Mayors of the City of "Ayodhya" in India and the City of "Gimhae" in South Korea also signed an International "Sister City" bond in March 2001 to formalise the relationship and encourage cultural and mutual development.

== See also ==
- Tombs and memorials
  - Tomb of Queen Consort of King Suro, Heo Hwang-ok's tomb in Korea
  - Preah Thong and Neang Neak, similar in Cambodia
  - Sri Lumay, similar in Cebu city in Philippines
- History of Indian influence on Southeast Asia
  - Buddhism in Korea
  - Hinduism in Korea
- People
  - Indians in Korea
  - Koreans in India
- Relations
  - India–South Korea relations
  - India – North Korea relations
