= Hinduism in Korea =

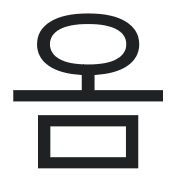
The "Om" symbol in Hangul (Note: 옴 (U+110B & U+1169 & U+1106))

Hinduism is a minority religion in Korea. There are 24,414 Indians in South Korea, most of whom are Hindus. Through Buddhism, it has also had an indirect impact on certain aspects of traditional Korean thought. The Four Heavenly Kings that can be seen in Korean Buddhist temples originated from the Lokapālas.

== North Korea ==
There are 586 Indians (most of them are embassy workers) in North Korea, may be majority of them are Hindus.

== South Korea ==
There are many Hindu temples in the Seoul region, like the Sri Radha Shyamasundar Mandir and the Sri Sri Radha Krishna temple, located on Seoul's outskirts, approximately 2 hours from the city centre. South Korea is home to a small number of expats, including students and engineers, from countries such as India and Nepal many of whom are Hindu. Yoga has also gained increasing popularity in recent years.

Sri Radha Shyamasundar Mandir is open daily, at specific times in the morning and evening. The temple offers various services to the mostly expat Hindu community, including children's classes, religious courses, festivals and ceremonies, such as weddings, as well as groceries for vegetarians.

Though South Korea is mostly secular, the range of religious beliefs displayed is quite broad. While Korean Shamanism shares some similarities with Hinduism, most religious people adhere to either Buddhism or Christianity, and there remains a strong Confucian presence.

The Rath Yatra was celebrated for the first time on the banks of the famous Han River in Seoul, the capital of South Korea, organized by the Seoul Sanatan Temple.

== List of Hindu temples in South Korea ==
- Sri Radha Shyamasundar Mandir, in Central Seoul
- Sri Lakshmi Narayanan Temple, in Metropolitan Seoul
- Himalayan Meditation and Yoga Sadhana Mandir, in Seocho in Seoul

== See also ==
- Indians in Korea
- Korean Buddhism
- Koreans in India
- Memorial of Heo Hwang-ok, Ayodhya
- Yoga's global dispersal#Korea
