= Indians in Korea =

Ethnic group

한국에 있는 인도인 कोरिया में भारतीय

Regions with significant populations
- South Korea: 17,000 (2025)
- North Korea: 16 (2025)

Religion
- Majority Hinduism

Related ethnic groups
- Indians in Japan

Indians in Korea include the migrant diaspora from India to Korea and their locally-born descendants. A majority of them live in Seoul and Busan, and smaller populations live in other parts of South Korea. The Indian population in North Korea is negligible, consisting of embassy staff and NGO members.

The Government of India's Ministry of External Affairs estimates the Overseas Indian population to be about 17,000 in South Korea, as of 2025. It is reported that 16 Indian citizens live in North Korea, although official data is hard to verify. During the Coronavirus pandemic, India safely evacuated its embassy staff through a special Russia-bound train.

== History of Indian migration ==
=== Malananta: the 4th century Indian Buddhist monk in Korea ===
Buddhist expansion in Asia, from Buddhist heartland in northern India (dark orange) starting 5th century BCE, to Buddhist majority realm (orange), and historical extent of Buddhism influences (yellow). Mahāyāna (red arrow), Theravāda (green arrow), and Tantric-Vajrayāna (blue arrow). The overland and maritime "Silk Roads" were interlinked and complementary, forming what scholars have called the "great circle of Buddhism".

The two oldest extant histories of Korea, 'Samguk yusa' and 'Samguk Sagi,' record the following three monks among the first to bring the Buddhist teaching, or Dharma, to Korea in the 4th century during the Three Kingdoms period. These mention the following monks: Malananta (मेघानंदा, Meghananda, Melananda or cloud monk)- an Indian Buddhist monk who came via the Serindian area of southern China's Eastern Jin Dynasty. He was received by the King Chimnyu of Baekje in the southern Korea in 384 CE.

=== Medieval period ===
In the 14th century, the Buddhist monk of Nalanda, Dhyānabhadra, came to Korea during the Goryeo period. He played an important role in the development of Buddhism in Korea and upon his death, his relics were ordered by Gongmin of Goryeo to be brought to Korea where his followers built a stupa on top.

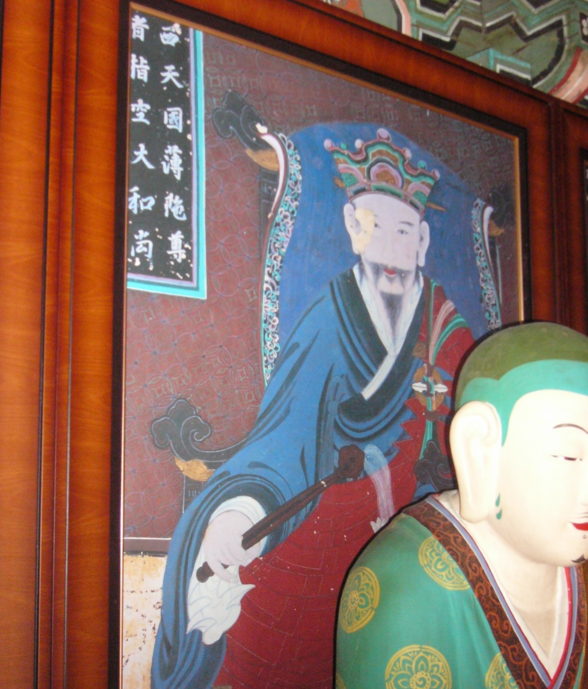
Portrait of Dhyānabhadra at Silleuksa

=== Postwar Korea ===
==== Economic Growth ====
After the Korean War, there remained only 1 Indian in South Korea, a United Nations Development Programme (UNDP) employee until 1966, when an Indian student came to study at Seoul National University. In the late 1960s, South Korea started exporting heavily, attracting some Indian diaspora with Sindhi traders from Hong Kong and Singapore. In the 1980s, professionals began immigrating to South Korea, and in the 1990s, South Korean universities admitted Indian students for classes and research.

== Current Status ==
=== Professional cooks ===
Most of professional cooks usually work at restaurants in Seoul, Busan, Daegu, and other cities. Some are hired by Korean owners of Indian restaurants and hotels, while others own their own restaurants.

== Organizations and associations ==
- "IndiansInKorea" (also known as IIK) - more than 5000 members and is an umbrella organization for Indians living in Korea, organizing events for significant holidays

== Discrimination and racism ==
Indians in South Korea have reported experiencing various forms of racial discrimination in social, educational, and professional settings. Academic studies and media reports note that South Asian migrants, including Indians, often face negative stereotypes related to skin tone, socioeconomic status, and nationality. These attitudes can manifest in everyday interactions, such as reluctance from some Koreans to sit next to darker‑skinned foreigners on public transport or avoidance in social situations. Although many Indians describe positive experiences in the country, accounts of prejudice remain a recurring theme in surveys and interviews conducted among migrant communities.

Several high-profile incidents have drawn public attention to discriminatory practices. In 2023, an Indian resident in Busan reported being denied entry to a nightclub that displayed a sign restricting access to Indian and Pakistani men, prompting widespread discussion on social media and coverage in Korean and international news outlets. Similar cases involving housing discrimination, workplace bias, and verbal harassment have been documented by migrant support organizations. These incidents have contributed to broader debates about xenophobia and the treatment of non‑white foreigners in South Korea.

In February 2026, Indian social media influencer Sachin Awasthi and his wife were denied entry into South Korea while attempting to travel to Jeju Island as tourists. According to media reports, the couple was held by immigration authorities for approximately 38 hours before being required to return.

After departing South Korea, they transited through China on their way back to India. Awasthi later described the experience on social media, stating that they were subjected to questioning and additional travel arrangements before being allowed to return home. The incident received attention online and was reported by Indian media outlets.

== See also ==
- Buddhism in Korea
- Hinduism in China
- Hinduism in Japan
- Hinduism in Korea
- Koreans in India
- Memorial of Heo Hwang-ok, Ayodhya
- India–South Korea relations
- India – North Korea relations
- List of Hindu temples outside India
