= Suro of Geumgwan Gaya =

King of Geumgwan Gaya (fl. 2nd century)

Kim Suro 金首露 김수로

King of Geumgwan Gaya
- Reign: 42 – 199
- Predecessor: Dynasty established
- Successor: Geodeung of Geumgwan Gaya
- Died: 199
- Spouse: Heo Hwang-ok
- House: Kim

- Suro of Geumgwan Gaya
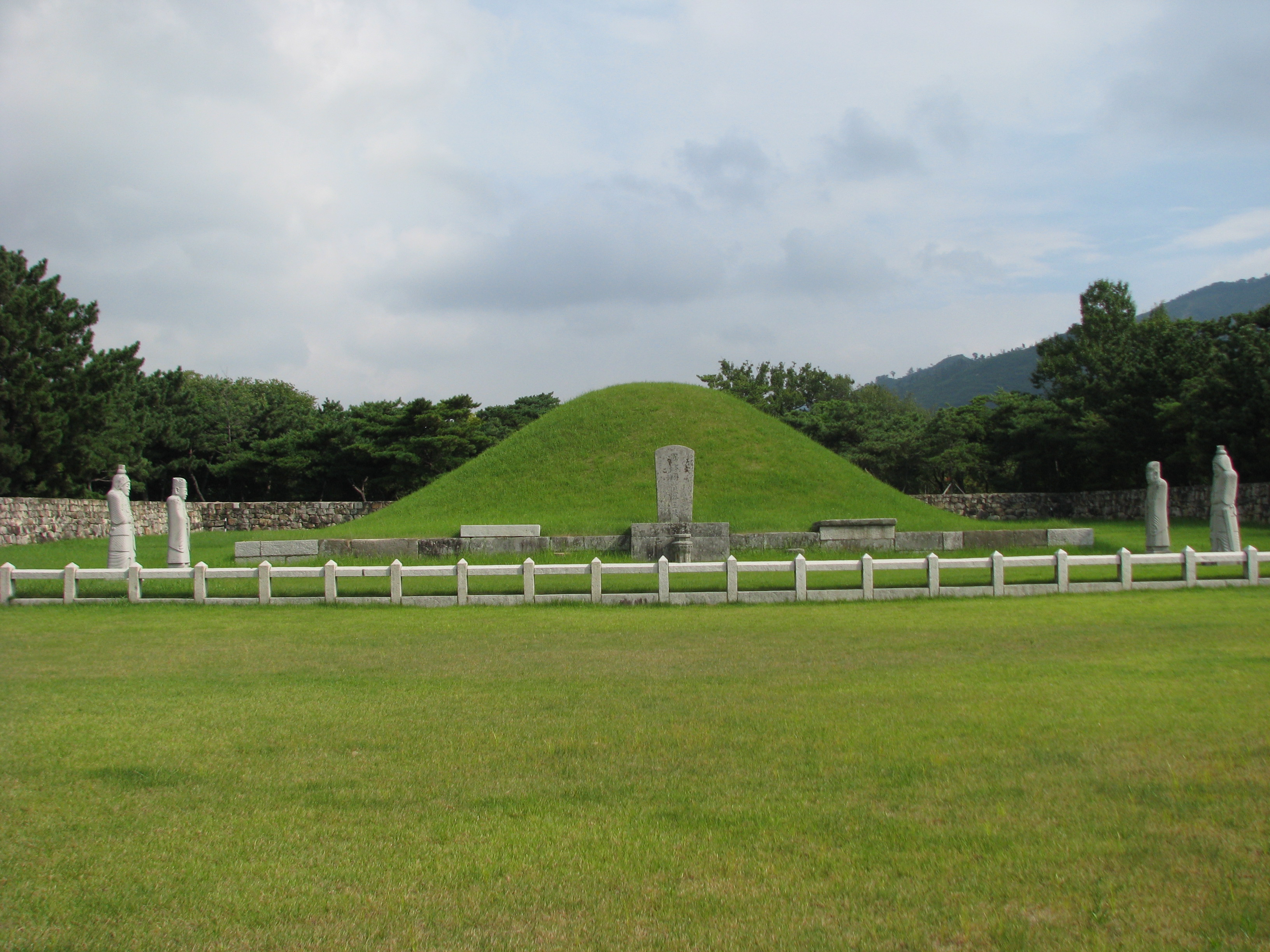
- Tomb of King Suro

Korean name
- Hangul: 김수로
- Hanja: 金首露
- RR: Gim Suro
- MR: Kim Suro

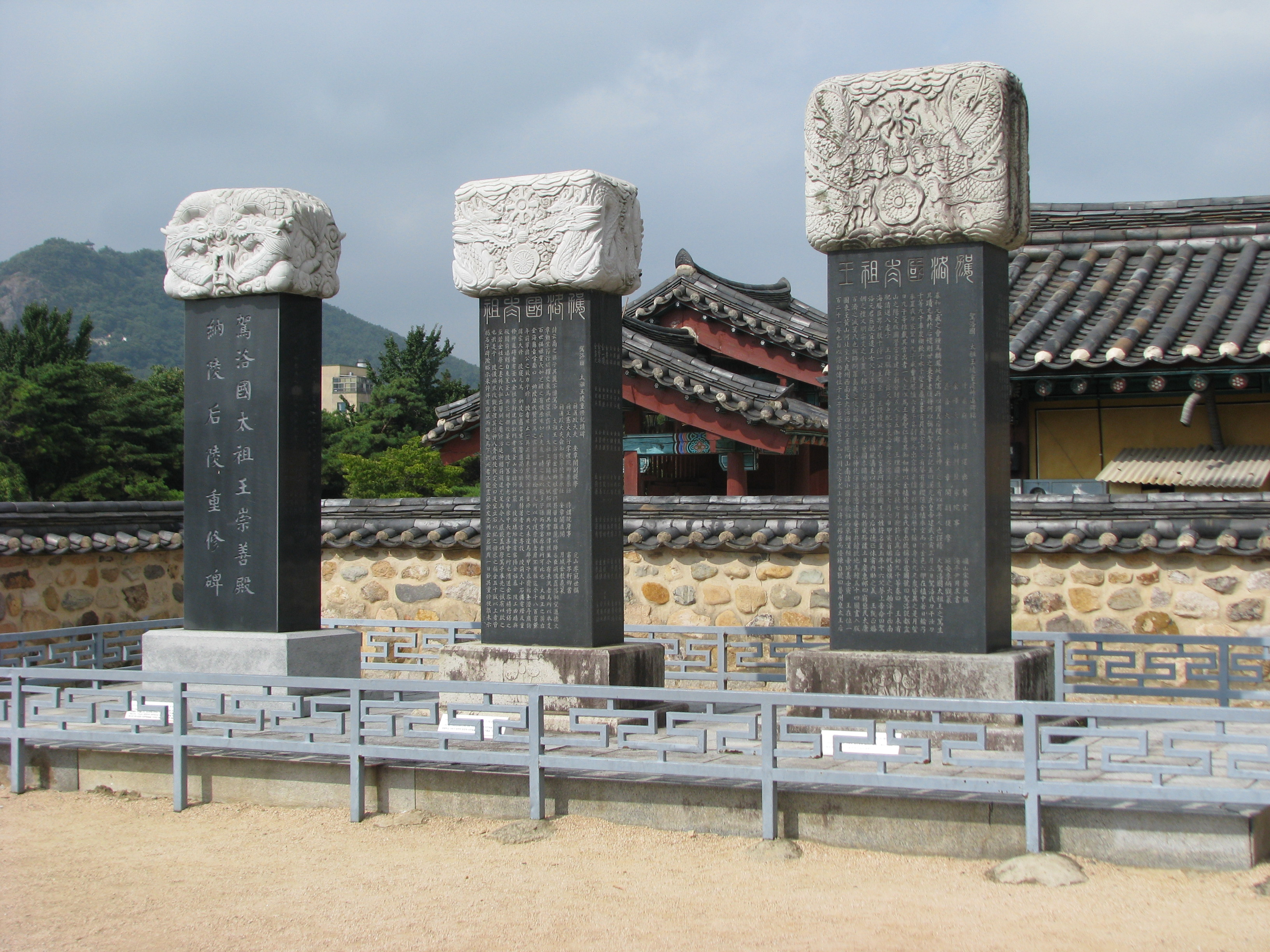
Tombstones at the Tomb of King Suro of Geumgwan Gaya in Gimhae, South Korea.

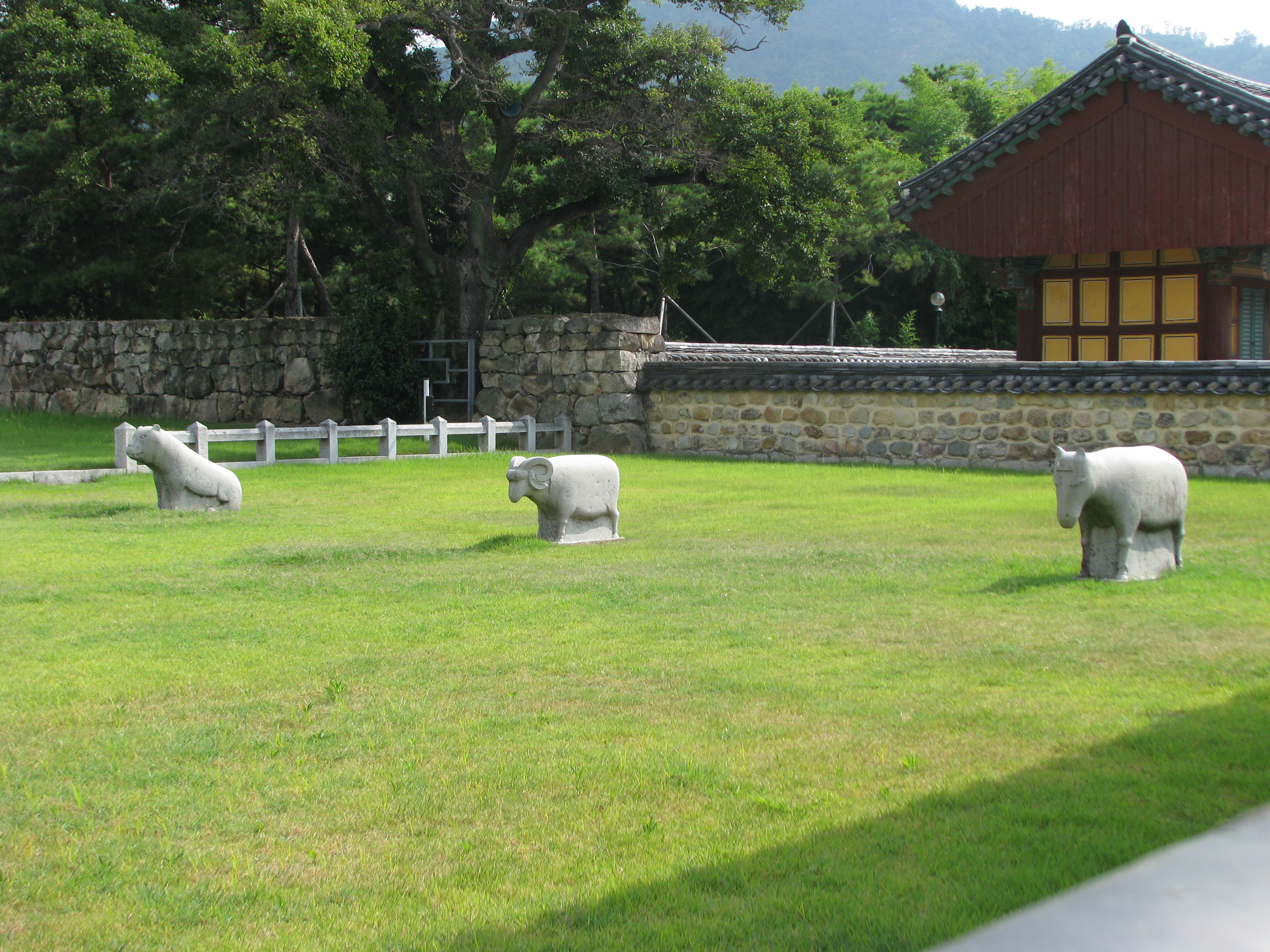
Sculptures at the Tomb of King Suro of Geumgwan Gaya in Gimhae, South Korea.

Suro (Korean: 수로), posthumous name Sureung (수릉; 首陵; died 199), commonly called Kim Suro, was the legendary founder and Hero King of Geumgwan Gaya (43–532), in southeastern Korea.

== Legend ==
According to the founding legend of Geumgwan Gaya, which was recorded in the 13th century texts of the chronicle Garakguk-gi and was cited in Samguk yusa, when the 9 Khans (9干) and their people who were commanded by heaven performed ancestral rites, danced and sang, a gold bowl wrapped in red cloth came down from heaven. There were six eggs in them, and 12 days later six princes were born from the eggs. Suro was the firstborn among them and led the others in setting up six states while asserting the leadership of the Gaya confederacy.

Also according to legend, King Suro's wife, Heo Hwang-ok or Suriratna was a princess from a distant country called Ayuta (아유타, 阿踰), also implied to be in Southern India.

The legend as a whole is seen as indicative of the early view of kings as descended from heaven. Notably, a number of Korean Kingdoms besides Gaya, made foundation legends with ties to chickens and eggs. Jumong, the founding King of Goguryeo, is said to have been born from an egg laid by Lady Yuhwa; Park Hyeokgeose, the first King of Silla (or Saro-guk) is said to have hatched from an egg discovered in a well; and Kim Al-chi, the progenitor of the Kim dynasty of Silla, is said to have been discovered in Gyerim Forest by Hogong in a golden box, where a rooster was crowing. Aspects of the legend have been mined for information about the customs of Gaya, of which little is known.

== Family ==
- Wife: Heo Hwang-ok
  - 1st son: King Geodeung
  - 2nd son: Prince Geochil of the Heo clan (거칠군 허씨; 居漆君 許氏)
  - 3rd son: Prince Seongyeong of the Heo clan (선견왕자 허씨; 仙見王子 許氏)
  - seven other sons (all become Buddhist monks: Haejin (혜진; 慧眞); Gakcho (각초; 覺初); Jigam (지감; 智鑑); Deungyeon (등연; 等演); Dumu (두무; 杜武); Jeonghong (정홍; 淨洪); Gyejang (계장; 戒莊))
  - 1st daughter: Princess Yeongan (영안공주; 永安公主) – married Bae Yeolmun (배열문; 裴烈文).
  - 2nd daughter: Lady Jijinnaerye of the Kim clan (지진내례부인 김씨; 只珍內禮夫人 金氏) – married Seok Guchu (석구추; 昔仇鄒).

== Incorporation of tomb into the Silla ancestor worship ==
At the time of King Munmu, the spirit tablet of Suro was temporarily respected along with fellow Silla Kings, as Munmu was his 15th grandson. According to the Samguk yusa, Munmu ordered the Jesa of King Suro.

== In modern culture ==
=== Tomb and descendants ===
A tomb attributed to King Suro is still maintained in modern-day Gimhae. Members of the Gimhae Kim clan, who continue to play essential roles in Korean life today, trace their ancestry to King Suro, as do the members of the Incheon Yi clan and Gimhae Heo clan; they did not inter-marry until the beginning of the 20th century. A Memorial Park for Kim Suro and his wife Heo Hwang-ok is being built in Ayodhya, India jointly by South Korean Government and Indian Government to strengthen relationship between both countries on the grounds of history and cultural heritage. Ayodhya and Gimhae became sister cities in 2001.

=== Television series ===
- Portrayed by Ji Sung and Park Gun-tae in the 2010 MBC TV series Kim Su-ro, The Iron King.

== See also ==
- List of monarchs of Korea
- History of Korea
- Three Kingdoms of Korea

Preceded by None	King of Gaya; 42–199	Succeeded by Geodeung Wang
