= List of state leaders in the 5th century =

This is a list of state leaders in the 5th century (401–500) AD.

== Africa ==
=== Africa: East ===
- Kingdom of Aksum (complete list) –

- Eon, King (c.400)
- Ebana, King (f. 5th century)
- Nezool, King (f. 5th century)
- Ousas, King (c.500)

=== Africa: Northcentral ===
- Vandal Kingdom (complete list) –

- Genseric, King (428–477)
- Huneric, King (477–484)
- Gunthamund, King (484–496)
- Thrasamund, King (496–523)

== Americas ==
=== Americas: Mesoamerica ===
Maya civilization

- Copán (complete list) –

- Kʼinich Yax Kʼukʼ Moʼ, King (426–c.437)
- Kʼinich Popol Hol, King (c.437)
- Ruler 3, King (c.455)
- Ku Ix, King (c.465)
- Ruler 5, King (c.476)
- Muyal Jol, King (c.485)

- Palenque (complete list) –

- Kʼukʼ Bahlam I, Ajaw (431–435)
- Casper, Ajaw (435–487)
- Bʼutz Aj Sak Chiik, Ajaw (487–501)

- Teotihuacan –

- Spearthrower Owl, Emperor (374–439)

- Tikal (complete list) –

- Yax Nuun Ahiin I, Ajaw (c.379–404)
- Sihyaj Chan Kʼawiil II, Ajaw (411–456)
- Kʼan Chitam, Ajaw (458–c.486)
- Chak Tok Ichʼaak II, Ajaw (c.486–508)

== Asia ==
=== Asia: Central ===
- Hephthalite Empire –

- Toramana, Tegin (c.490–515)

- Rouran Khaganate (complete list) –

- Yujiulü Shelun, Khan (402–410)
- Yujiulü Hulü, Khan (410–414)
- Yujiulü Datan, Khan (414–429)
- Yujiulü Wuti, Khan (429–444)
- Yujiulü Tuhezhen, Khan (444–450)
- Yujiulü Yucheng, Khan (450–485)
- Yujiulü Doulun, Khan (485–492)
- Yujiulü Nagai, Khan (492–506)

- Tibet (Yarlung Valley) (complete list) –

- Tritog Jetsen, King
- Thothori Nyantsen, King (5th century)
- Trinyen Zungtsen, King

- Gaochang

- Kàn Bózhōu, ruler (460-477)
- Kàn Yìchéng, ruler (477-478)
- Kàn Shǒugūi, ruler (478-488/491)
- Zhāng Mèngmíng, ruler (488/491-496)
- Mǎ Rú, ruler (496-501)

=== Asia: East ===
China: Jin dynasty and Sixteen Kingdoms

- Western Jin, China (complete list) –

- An, Emperor (396–419)
- Gong, Emperor (419–420)

- Huan Chu –

- Huan Xuan, Prince (403–404)

- Later Liang –

- Lü Zuan, Emperor (400–401)
- Lü Long, Emperor (401–403)

- Later Qin –

- Yao Xing, Emperor (394–416)
- Yao Hong, Emperor (416–417)

- Later Yan –

- Murong Sheng, Emperor (398–401)
- Murong Xi, Emperor (401–407)
- Gao Yun, Emperor (407–409)

- Northern Liang –

- Duan Ye, Prince (397–401)
- Juqu Mengxun, Emperor (401–433)
- Juqu Mujian, Emperor (433–439)

- Northern Yan –

- Gao Yun, Emperor (407–409)
- Féng Bá, Emperor (409–430)
- Féng Hóng, Emperor (430–436)

- Southern Liang –

- Tufa Lilugu, Prince (399–402)
- Tufa Rutan, Prince (402–414)

- Western Liang –

- Li Gao, Prince (400–417)
- Li Xin, Prince (417–420)
- Li Xun, Prince (420–421)

- Southern Yan –

- Murong De, Prince (398–405)
- Murong Chao, Prince (405–410)

- Western Qin –

- Qifu Chipan, Emperor (412–428)
- Qifu Mumo, Emperor (428–431)

- Xia –

- Helian Bobo, Emperor (407–425)
- Helian Chang, Emperor (425–428)
- Helian Ding, Emperor (428–431)

China: Northern dynasties

- Northern Wei (complete list) –

- Daowu, Emperor (386–409)
- Mingyuan, Emperor (409–423)
- Taiwu, Emperor (424–452)
- Tuoba Yu, Emperor (452)
- Wencheng, Emperor (452–465)
- Xianwen, Emperor (466–471)
- Xiaowen, Emperor (471–499)
- Xuanwu, Emperor (499–515)

China: Southern dynasties

- Liu Song (complete list) –

- Wu, Emperor (420–422)
- Shao, Emperor (422–424)
- Wen, Emperor (424–453)
- Yuanxiong, Emperor (453–454)
- Xiaowu, Emperor (454–464)
- Qianfei, Emperor (465)
- Ming, Emperor (465–472)
- Houfei, Emperor (473–477)
- Shun, Emperor (477–479)

- Southern Qi (complete list) –

- Gao, Emperor (479–482)
- Wu, Emperor (483–493)
- Xiao Zhaoye, Emperor (493–494)
- Xiao Zhaowen, Emperor (494)
- Ming, Emperor (494–498)
- Xiao Baojuan, Emperor (499–501)

Japan

- Japan, Yayoi period (complete list) –

- Richū, Emperor (400–405)
- Hanzei, Emperor (406–410)
- Ingyō, Emperor (411–453)
- Ankō, Emperor (453–456)
- Yūryaku, Emperor (456–479)
- Seinei, Emperor (480–484)
- Kenzō, Emperor (485–487)
- Ninken, Emperor (488–498)
- Buretsu, Emperor (498–506)

Korea

- Baekje (complete list) –

- Asin, King (392–405)
- Jeonji, King (405–420)
- Guisin, King (420–427)
- Biyu, King (427–455)
- Gaero, King (455–475)
- Munju, King (475–477)
- Samgeun, King (477–479)
- Dongseong, King (479–501)

- Geumgwan Gaya (complete list) –

- Isipum, King (346–407)
- Jwaji, King (407–421)
- Chwihui, King (421–451)
- Jilji, King (451–492)
- Gyeomji, King (492–521)

- Goguryeo (complete list) –

- Gwanggaeto, King (391–413)
- Jangsu, King (413–490)
- Munja, King (491–519)

- Silla (complete list) –

- Naemul, King (356–402)
- Silseong, King (402–417)
- Nulji, King (417–458)
- Jabi, King (458–479)
- Soji, King (479–500)
- Jijeung, King (500–514)

=== Asia: Southeast ===
Cambodia

- Funan (complete list) –

- Zhāntán, King (c.357)
- Qiáochénrú, King (c.420)
- Chílítuóbámó, King (c.430–c.440)
- Qiáochénrú Shéyébámó, King (484–514)

Indonesia

Indonesia: Java

- Tarumanagara (complete list) –

- Purnawarman, King (395–434)
- Wisnuwarman, King (434–455)
- Indrawarman, King (455–515)

Indonesia: Sumatra

- Samaskuta Kingdom –

- Prabhava Sangkala, King (c.416)

- Kantoli –

- Sri Varanarendra, King (c.460)

Indonesia: Kalimantan (Borneo)

- Kutai Martadipura –

- Mulavarman, King (c.400)

Malaysia: Peninsular

- Old Pahang Kingdom –

- Kudungga, Maharaja (mid 5th century)

- Kedah Sultanate (complete list) –

- DiMaharaja Putra, Maharaja (c.390–440)
- Maha Dewa I, Maharaja (c.440–465)
- Karna DiMaharaja, Maharaja (c.465–512)

Thailand

- Lavo Kingdom –

- Phraya Kalavarnadishraj, King (mid 5th century)

Vietnam

- Jiaozhou:
  - Đỗ Viện (杜瑗) (381- 410)
  - Lý Trường Nhân (468-479)
  - Thẩm Hoán (de jure), Lý Thúc Hiến (de facto) (479)
  - Lý Thúc Hiến (479 - 485)
  - Lưu Khải (485 - 490)
  - Phòng Pháp Thặng (till November 490)
  - Phục Đăng Chi (November 490 until sometime prior to 502)
  - Lý Nguyên Khải (502, before the felt of the Southern Qi, to 505)
  - Unknown leader(s) from 505 to 516
  - Lý Tắc (516 until sometime prior to 541)
- Champa (complete list) –

- Bhadravarman I, King (380–413)
- Gangaraja, King (early 5th century)
- Manorathavarman, King (early 5th century)
- Fan Diwen, King (410s–c.420)
- Fan Yang Mai I, King (c.420–421)
- Fan Yang Mai II, King (c.431–c.455)
- Fan Shencheng, King (c.455–c.484)
- Fan Danggenchun, King (c.484–c.492)
- Fan Zhunong, King (c.492–c.498)

=== Asia: South ===
Northeast India

- Kamarupa: Varman dynasty (complete list) –

- Balavarman, King (398–422)
- Kalyanavarman, King (422–446)
- Ganapativarman, King (446–470)
- Mahendravarman, King (470–494)
- Narayanavarman, King (494–518)

India

- Chalukya dynasty (complete list) –

- Jayasimha, King (c.500–c.520)

- Eastern Ganga dynasty (complete list) –

- Indravarman I, King (496–535)

- Western Ganga dynasty (complete list) –

- Harivarman, King (390–410)
- Vishnugopa, King (410–430)
- Madhava III Tandangala, King (430–469)
- Avinita, King (469–529)

- Gupta Empire (complete list) –

- Chandragupta II, Emperor (c.375–c.415)
- Kumaragupta I, Emperor (c.414–c.455)
- Skandagupta, Emperor (c.455–c.467)
- Purugupta, Emperor (c.467–c.473)
- Kumaragupta II, Emperor (c.473–c.476)
- Budhagupta, Emperor (c.476–c.495)
- Narasimhagupta Baladitya, Emperor (c.495–?)

- Kadamba dynasty: Banavasi branch (complete list) –

- Bhageerath, Maharaja (390–415)
- Raghu, Maharaja (415–435)
- Kakusthavarma, Maharaja (435–455)
- Santivarma, Maharaja (455–460)
- Shiva Mandhatri, Maharaja (460–475)
- Mrigeshavarma, Maharaja (475–485)
- Ravivarma, Maharaja (485–519)

- Kadamba dynasty: Triparvatha branch (complete list) –

- Krishna Varma I, Maharaja (455–475)
- Vishnuvarma, Maharaja (475–485)
- Simhavarma, Maharaja (485–516)

- Maitraka dynasty (complete list) –

- Bhatarka, Senapati (c.470–c.492)
- Dharasena I, Senapati (c.493–c.499)
- Dronasinha, Maharaja (c.500–c.520)

- Pallava dynasty –

- The Pallava dynasty has two chronologies of rulers.
- Viravarman, King (385–400)
- Skandavarman III, King (400–435/436)
- Simhavarman II, King (435/436–460)
- Skandavarman IV, King (460–480)
- Nandivarman I, King (480–500/510)

- Vakataka dynasty: Pravarapura–Nandivardhana branch (complete list) –

- Damodarasena, King (400–440)
- Narendrasena, King (440–460)
- Prithivishena II, King (460–480)

- Vakataka dynasty: Vatsagulma branch (complete list) –

- Pravarasena II, King (400–415)
- unknown king, (415–450)
- Devasena, King (450–475)
- Harishena, King (475–500)

- Vishnukundina dynasty (complete list) –

- Madhava Varma I, Maharaja (c.420–c.455)
- Madhava Varma II, Maharaja (c.440–c.460)

Sri Lanka

- Anuradhapura Kingdom (complete list) –

- Upatissa I, King (370–412)
- Mahanama, King (412–434)
- Soththisena, King (434–434)
- Chattagahaka Jantu, King (434–435)
- Mittasena, King (435–436)
- Pandu, King (436–441)
- Parindu, King (441–441)
- Khudda Parinda, King (441–447)
- Tiritara, King (447–447)
- Dathiya, King (447–450)
- Pithiya, King (450–452)
- Dhatusena, King (455–473)
- Kashyapa I, King (479–497)
- Moggallana I, King (497–515)

=== Asia: West ===
Persia

- Persia: Sasanian Empire (complete list) –

- Yazdegerd I, Shahanshah, King of Kings (399–420)
- Shapur IV,§ Shahanshah, King of Kings (420)
- Khosrau the Usurper,§ Shahanshah, King of Kings (420)
- Bahram V, Shahanshah, King of Kings (420–438)
- Yazdegerd II, Shahanshah, King of Kings (438–457)
- Hormizd III, Shahanshah, King of Kings (457–459)
- Peroz I, Shahanshah, King of Kings (459–484)
- Balash, Shahanshah, King of Kings (484–488)
- Kavadh I, Shahanshah, King of Kings (488–496)
- Djamasp, Shahanshah, King of Kings (496–498)
- Kavadh I, Shahanshah, King of Kings (498–496, 499–531)

== Europe ==
=== Europe: Balkans ===
- Roman Empire: East/ Byzantine Empire (complete list) –

- Arcadius

- Junior Emperor (383–395)
- Eastern Emperor (395–408)

- Theodosius II, Eastern Emperor (402–450)
- Pulcheria, Eastern Empress, Regent (450–453)
- Marcian, Eastern Emperor (450–457)
- Leo I, Eastern Emperor (457–474)
- Leo II, Eastern Emperor (474)
- Zeno

- Eastern Emperor (474–475)
- Emperor (476–491)

- Marcus, Caesar/ Junior co-Emperor (475–476)
- Basiliscus, Eastern Emperor (475–476)
- Anastasius I, Eastern Emperor (491–518)

=== Europe: British Isles ===
Great Britain: Scotland

- Dál Riata (complete list) –

- Loarn, King (474–500)
- Fergus Mór, King (500–501)

- Kingdom of Strathclyde / Alt Clut (complete list) –

- Ceretic Guletic, King (mid 5th century)
- Cinuit, King (late 5th century)

- Isle of Man (complete list) –

- Tutagual Theodovellaunus, King (c.485–c.495)
- Dingat, King (c. 495);

Great Britain: England

- The Britons (complete list) –

- Vortigern, King (c.425–452)
- Riothamus, King (c.469)
- Ambrosius Aurelianus, Leader (late 5th century)

- Dumnonia (complete list) –

- Erbin ap Constantine (c.443–c.480)
- Geraint, King (c.480–c.514)

- Kingdom of Kent –

- Hengest, King (c.455–488)
- Horsa, King (c.455–488)
- Oisc, King (488–c.512)

- Kingdom of Sussex (complete list) –

- Aelle, King (c.477–c.514)

Great Britain: Wales

- Kingdom of Ceredigion –

- Ceredig, King (424–453)
- Usai ap Ceredig, King (453–490)
- Serwyl ap Usai, King (490–523)

- Kingdom of Gwent (complete list) –

- Iddon ap Ynyr, King (480–490)
- Tewdrig, King (490–493/517)
- Meurig ap Tewdrig, King (493/517–530–540)

- Glywysing (complete list) –

- Glywys, King (c.470–c.480)
- Gwynllyw, ruler (c.480–523)
- Pawl, ruler (c.480–540)
- Mechwyn, ruler (c.480–c.500)

- Kingdom of Gwynedd –

- Einion Yrth ap Cunedda, King (c.470–500)
- Cadwallon Lawhir ap Einion, King (c.500–534)

- Kingdom of Powys (complete list) –

- Vortigern, High King
- Cadeyern Fendigaid, King (c.430–447)
- Cadell Ddyrnllwg, King (c.447–460)
- Rhuddfedel Frych, King (c.480–500)
- Cyngen Glodrydd, King (c.500–530)

Ireland

- Ireland (complete list) –

These kings are generally though historical, but dates are uncertain and naming some High Kings may be anachronistic or inaccurate.
- Niall Noígíallach, High King (generally thought historical: 4th–5th century)
- Nath Í, High King (4th–5th century)
- Lóegaire mac Néill, High King (5th century)
- Ailill Molt, High King of Ireland (459–478)
- Lugaid mac Lóegairi, High King of Ireland (479–503)

=== Europe: Central ===
- Alamannia, tribal kingdom (complete list) –

- Gibuld, petty king (fl.470)

- Thuringia (complete list) –

- Bisinus, King (450–500)

=== Europe: East ===
- Kingdom of the Gepids

- Ardaric, fl. c. 454
- Giesmus, fl. early 480s
- Thraustila, fl. 488

- Huns (complete list) –

- Octar, King (c.422–c.430)
- Rugila, King (c.430–c.434)
- Bleda, King (c.434–445)
- Attila, King (c.434–453)
- Ellac, King (453–c.455)
- Dengizich, King (?–469)
- Ernak, King (469–503)

=== Europe: Nordic ===
- Agder (Norway) (complete list) –

- Víkar, King (c.475–c.495)

- Sweden (complete list) –

- Ongentheow, King (c.490–515)

=== Europe: Southcentral ===
- Roman Empire: West (complete list) –

- Honorius, Western Emperor (395–423)
- Stilicho, power behind the throne (395–408)
- Constantine III, usurper Emperor (407–411)
- Priscus Attalus, usurper Emperor (409–410, 414–415)
- Jovinus, usurper Emperor (411–412)
- Constantius III, Western Co-Emperor (421)
- Valentinian III, Western Emperor (423–455)
- Galla Placidia, Regent (423–433)
- Aëtius, Regent (433–454)
- Joannes, usurper Emperor (423–425)
- Petronius Maximus, Western Emperor (455)
- Avitus, Western Emperor (455–456)
- Ricimer, power behind the throne (456–472)
- Majorian, Western Emperor (457–461)
- Libius Severus, Western Emperor (461–465)
- Anthemius, Western Emperor (467–472)
- Olybrius, Western Emperor (472)
- Glycerius, Western Emperor (473–474)
- Julius Nepos, Western Emperor (474–475, 476–480)
- Romulus Augustus, Western Emperor (475–476)
- Flavius Orestes, power behind the throne (475–476)

- Ostrogoths –

- Theodemir, King (470–474)

- Ostrogothic Kingdom of Italy (complete list) –

- Odoacer, King (476–493)
- Theodoric I, King (493–526)

- Lombards (complete list) –

- Claffo, King (c.490–500)
- Tato, King (c.500–510)

=== Europe: West ===
- First Kingdom of Burgundy (complete list) –

- Gebicca, King (late 4th century–c.407)
- Gundomar I, King (c.407–411)
- Giselher, King (c.411–?)
- Gunther, King (?–437)
- Gondioc, King (436–473)
- Chilperic I, King in opposition (443–c.480)
- Gundobad, King in Lyon and Burgundy (473–516)
- Chilperic II, King in Valence (473–493)
- Gundomar/Godomar, King in Vienne (473–486)
- Godegisel, King in Vienne and Geneva (473–500)

- Franks (complete list) –

- Pharamond, King (c.410–426)
- Clodio, King (426–447)
- Merowig, King (447–457)
- Childeric I, King (457–481)
- Clovis I, King (481–509)

- Kingdom of Galicia / Kingdom of the Suebi (complete list) –

- Hermeric, King (409–438)
- Rechila, King (438–448)
- Rechiar, King (448–456)

- Kingdom of Soissons –

- Aegidius, magister militum (457–464)
- Syagrius, magister militum (464–486)

- Vandals (complete list) –

- Godigisel, King (359–407)
- Gunderic, King (407–428)
- His successor establishes the Vandal Kingdom in Africa

- Visigothic Kingdom (complete list) –

- Alaric I, King (395–410)
- Ataulf, King (410–415)
- Sigeric, King (415)
- Wallia, King (415–419)
- Theodoric I, King (419–451)
- Thorismund, King (451–453)
- Theodoric II, King (453–466)
- Euric, King (466–484)
- Alaric II, King (484–507)

=== Eurasia: Caucasus ===
- Armenia: Arsacid dynasty (complete list) –

- Vramshapuh, client King under Rome (389–417)
- Artaxias IV, client King under Rome (422–428)

- Kingdom of Iberia (Kartli) (complete list) –

- Trdat, King (394–406)
- Pharasmanes IV, King (406–409)
- Mihrdat IV, King (409–411)
- Archil, King (411–435)
- Mihrdat V, King (435–447)
- Vakhtang I Gorgasali, King (447–522)

== See also ==
- List of political entities in the 5th century
