= North Acropolis, Tikal =

Ancient site in Guatemala

Coordinates: 17.2227°N 89.6234°W

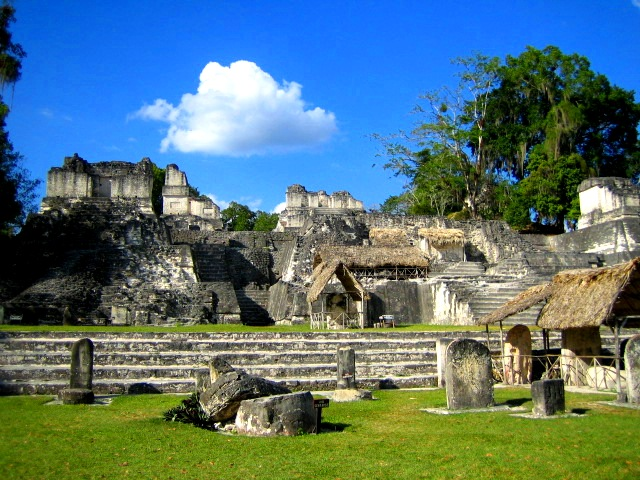
The North Acropolis viewed from the Great Plaza

The North Acropolis of the ancient Maya city of Tikal in Guatemala is an architectural complex that served as a royal necropolis and was a centre for funerary activity for over 1300 years. The acropolis is located near the centre of the city and is one of the most studied of Maya architectural complexes. Excavations were carried out from 1957 to 1969 by the University of Pennsylvania, directed by Edwin M. Shook and William Coe.

The first traces of human activity at the site date to approximately 800 BCE, with the first structures being built about 350 BCE. Around 250 CE the complex underwent a major redevelopment with the construction of a massive basal platform that supported a cluster of temples; this was followed around 450 CE by the addition of a row of four pyramids on a terrace to the south of the main platform.

A number of royal tombs have been excavated that have been identified with named kings, including the tombs of Yax Nuun Ayiin I (ruled 379 CE – c. 404), Siyaj Chan K'awiil II (ruled 411–456), Wak Chan K'awiil (ruled 537–562) and "Animal Skull" (ruled c. 593–638). An early tomb in the North Acropolis has been tentatively identified as that of the dynastic founder Yax Ehb' Xook (ruled c. 90).

A large number of stone monuments were placed in the North Acropolis. By the 9th century CE these included 43 stelae and 30 altars; 18 of these monuments were sculpted with hieroglyphic texts and royal portraits. A number of these monuments show the influence of the great city of Teotihuacan in the Valley of Mexico.

== Development ==
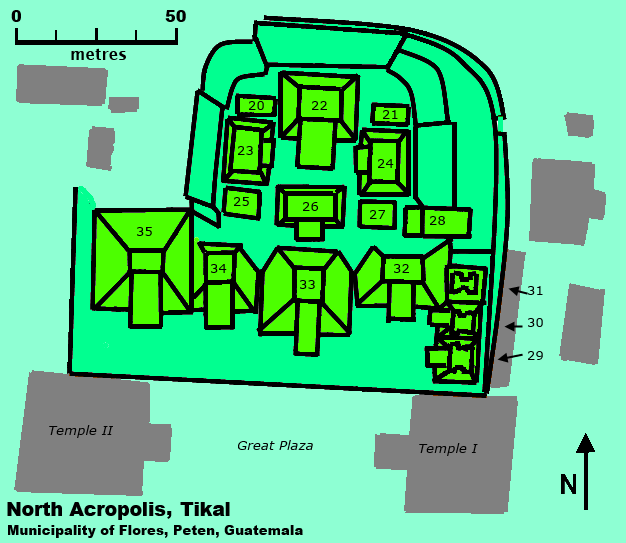
Map of the North Acropolis

The earliest traces of working of the limestone bedrock under the basal platform of the acropolis date to about 800 BCE, consisting of deep cuts into the rock associated with refuse from domestic and ceremonial activity. The first structures in what became the North Acropolis were built around 350 BCE, towards the end of the Middle Preclassic period (c. 1000–300 BCE).

=== Late Preclassic period ===
During the Late Preclassic (c. 300 BCE – 250 CE), a 49-metre (161 ft) wide causeway was built to unite the North Acropolis with the Mundo Perdido complex to the southwest. The earliest dated architecture in the North Acropolis was built in the second century BCE and consisted of a low basal platform to the north with two smaller platforms immediately to the south, which were forerunners of the triadic pyramid complex formed by the later Temples 22, 23 and 24. These were not the first structures to be built since the remains of earlier versions of the platforms have been identified underneath but these suffered such extensive destruction prior to the building of the 2nd century BCE version that no physical sequence can be reconstructed.

In the 1st century CE the complex underwent a major expansion. At this time there was a gradual shift in focus from the major Preclassic Mundo Perdido complex to the North Acropolis, which was marked out as the new ceremonial centre of the city and received the first royal burials, so far not conclusively identified with named rulers.

=== Classic period ===
During the Classic period (c. 250–900 CE) the royal dynasty of Tikal developed the complex into a royal necropolis, with each successive ruler superimposing new temples over earlier structures. Around 250 CE, the pre-existing architecture was demolished and a new basal platform was built, supporting four corbel-vaulted structures. Around 400 CE the complex was expanded southwards from its original basal platform with the addition of a row of tall pyramids that divided the original architecture from Tikal's main plaza. Towards the end of the 7th century, King Jasaw Chan K'awiil I ordered the construction of a new version Temple 33, possibly to house the remains of Nuun Ujol Chaak, his father. This new building completely blocked the entrance to the North Acropolis, formerly ending its role as the preferred burial ground of Tikal's kings. Around 734 CE king Jasaw Chan K'awiil was entombed in Temple I on the east side of the plaza, ending the tradition of interring rulers within the North Acropolis.

=== Postclassic period ===
Funerary activity continued as late as the Postclassic (c. 900–1525). Towards the end of Tikal's dwindling occupancy, during the 10th or 11th centuries, squatters were mining the North Acropolis in search of jade grave goods in the elite tombs; some of the easier-to-find burials were located and looted at this time.

== Structures ==
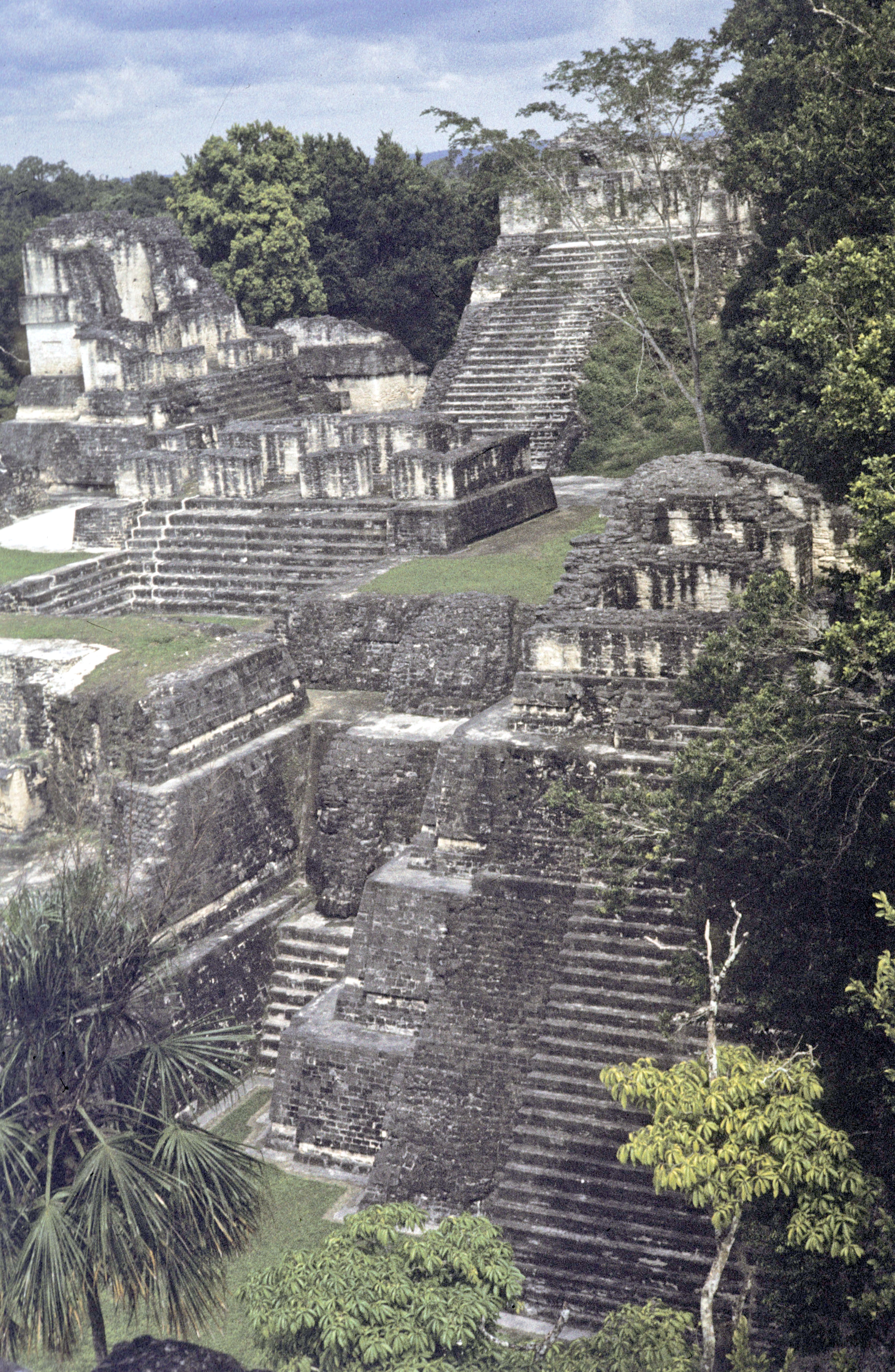
View across the North Acropolis. At back: Temples 23, 20 and 22. Temple 26 is in the centre; Temple 32 dominates the foreground, with Temple 33 to its left.

The North Acropolis closes off the Great Plaza on the north side. The basal platform of the North Acropolis covers an area of just under 1 hectare (2.5 acres); measuring approximately 100 by 80 metres (330 by 260 ft). It stands 9 metres (30 ft) above its bedrock foundation and 12 metres (39 ft) above the Great Plaza, and is accessed by a number of stairways on its south side. During the Preclassic period, the facades of many of the temples were decorated with brightly coloured stucco ornamentation, including giant masks flanking some of the access stairways. By the Early Classic, eight temple-pyramids stood upon the platform, each with an access stairway flanked by masks, a small summit shrine and an elaborate roof comb.

=== Basal platform ===
Most of the structures upon the basal platform underwent two consecutive construction phases during the Early Classic, except Temple 22 which underwent three phases of construction. The structures upon the basal platform all date to the Early Classic period and were laid out in a symmetrical arrangement over the course of three centuries. This forms the greatest concentration of pure Early Classic architecture at Tikal, using construction methods distinct from that of the major Late Classic temples around the Great Plaza. The Early Classic construction involved the complete finishing of the basal platform as a distinct architectural unit before the additional structures were built upon it.

Temple 20 (Structure 5D-20) is located upon the northwest corner of the basal platform and looks outwards to the north. It is estimated to date to approximately 550 CE.

Temple 21 (Structure 5D-21) forms a pair with Temple 20; it is located upon the northeast corner of the basal platform and also looks outwards to the north; it is thought to date to around 550 CE.

Temple 22 (Structure 5D-22) is a south-facing building located centrally on the north side of the basal platform. Temple 22 underwent three principal phases of construction. The earliest version of this structure was built around 250 CE; a second version of the temple was built over it around 350 CE; this version was decorated with giant stucco masks. The final version of the temple dates to the 5th century CE. Temple 22 has been extensively investigated by archaeologists with portions of the 5th-century architecture being stripped away to expose the earlier versions. A tomb in the Temple 22 was looted at some point during the Postclassic period.

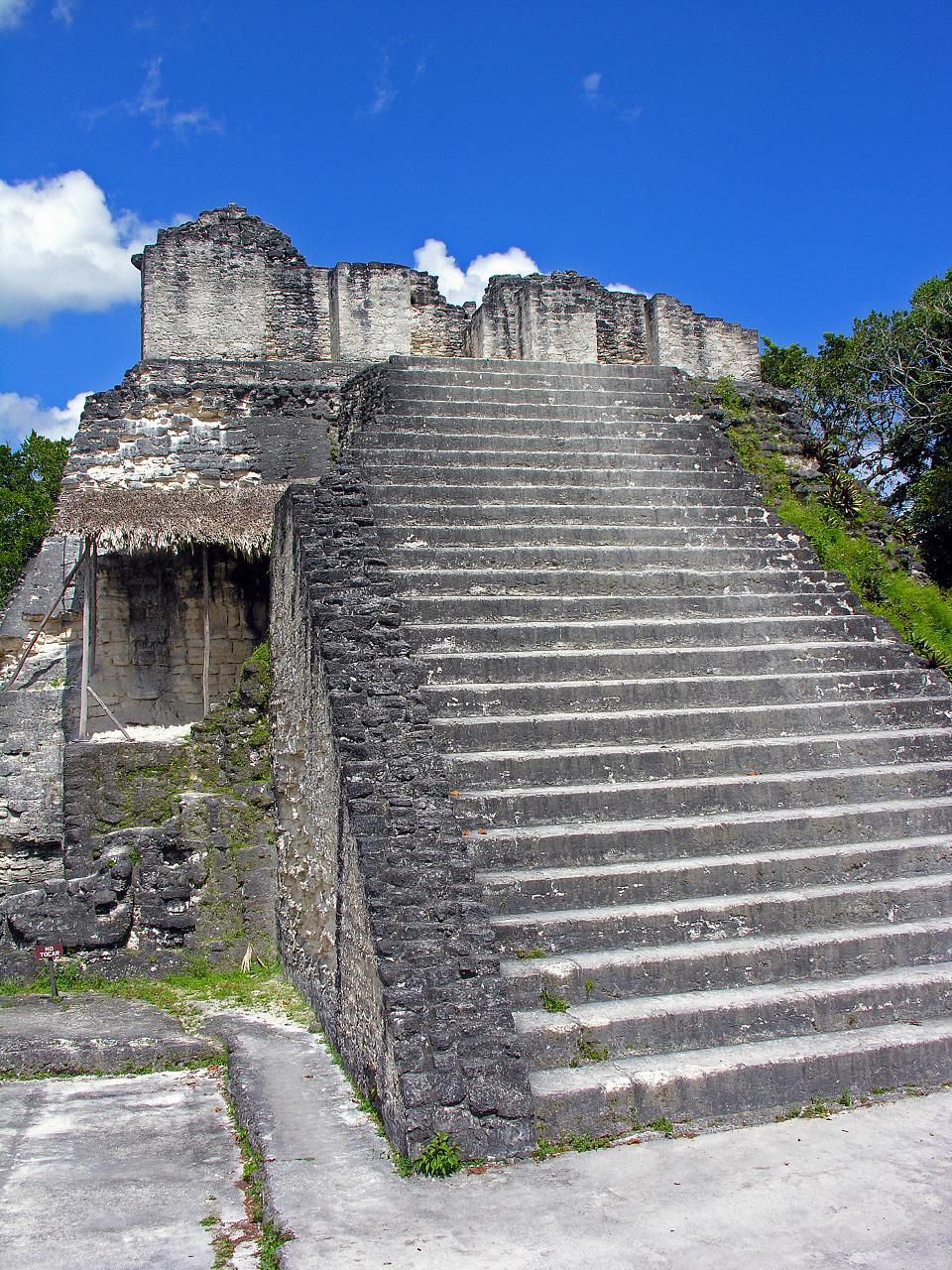
Temple 22

Temple 23 (Structure 5D-23) has been partially restored and dates to the middle of the 3rd century CE. It is situated on the centre of the west side of the basal platform, facing east.

Temple 24 (Structure 5D-24) dates to around 250 CE. It forms a pair with Temple 23, being located on the east side of the basal platform, facing west. Temple 24 has not been explored by archaeologists.

Temple 25 (Structure 5D-25) is located on the southwest corner of the basal platform; it was first built around 250 CE and underwent a second Early Classic construction phase that completely covered the earlier version.

Temple 26 (Structure 5D-26) is the central building in the North Acropolis, located centrally on the south side of the basal platform overlooking the terrace; the earliest version of this structure dates to approximately 250 CE. Temple 26 has been fully excavated and restored. A tomb in the structure was looted at some time during the Postclassic period. The northern portion of the structure stood over a Late Preclassic tomb (Burial 85) dated to around 100 CE, which has been tentatively identified as that of dynastic founder Yax Ehb' Xook.

Temple 27 (Structure 5D-27) forms a pair with Temple 25. It is situated on the southeast corner of the basal platform. Archaeologists presume that this structure underwent the same two Early Classic construction phases as its twin. It was built around 250 CE.

Building 28 (Structure 5D-28) is an unusual building at the top of an access stairway on the east side of the basal platform. It appears to have been a guardroom controlling access from the east terrace. The chamber originally contained curtained doorways and benches against the walls. The width of the building completely blocked access from the stairway; this forced visitors to pass through the chamber, where their presence could be scrutinised and passage beyond blocked if necessary. This route may have become important when Temple 33 was built, blocking the main access stairway from the Great Plaza. Structure 5D-28 was built very late in the Early Classic period (around the 6th century).

=== Terrace ===
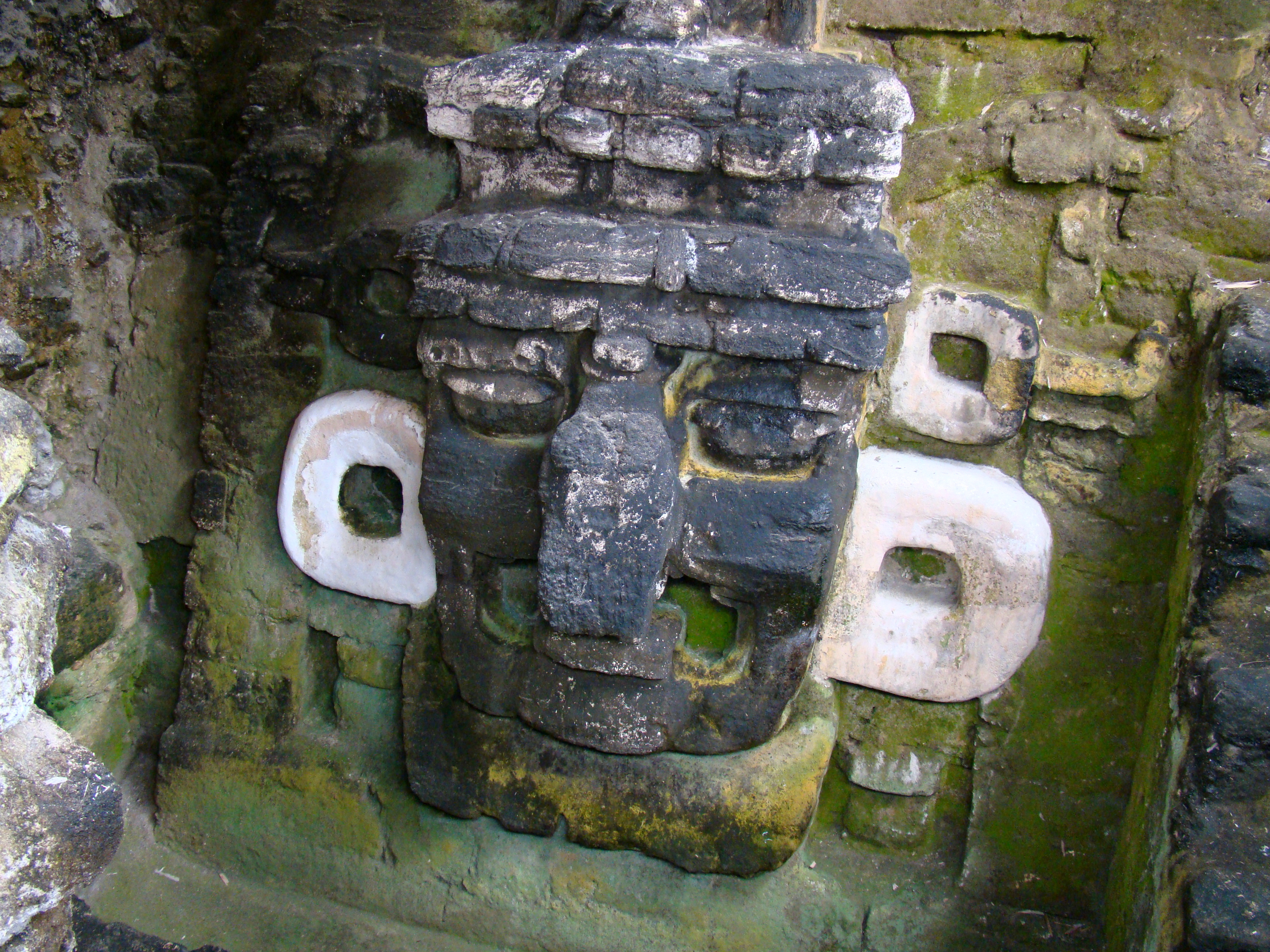
Giant mask from earliest version of Temple 33 (sub-3). This example adorned the pyramid base to the west of the stairway.

A trio of small Early Classic temples (Temples 29 to 31) stand upon a common platform at the east end of the terrace, facing west. It is likely that the platform was purposely built to support the three temples that were built more-or-less simultaneously. Neither the platform nor the temples have been investigated; it is therefore possible that an early version of the central temple (Temple 30) was built first, then decommissioned with the platform being built to cover the early version, followed by the construction of a new version plus the two additional flanking temples.

Temple 29 (Structure 5D-29) is located at the east end of the terrace of the North Acropolis, facing west. Stela 40 was excavated at its base in 1996. Temple 29 is one of a trio of similar structures, with Temples 30 and 31. Temple 29 has not been excavated; the corbel vaulting and roof has collapsed to fill the three chambers of the superstructure with rubble. Of the trio of temples, Temple 29 is the only one to display traces of red paint. The basal platform of the temple stands 3.5 metres (11 ft) high and the superstructure walls measure 2.3 metres (7.5 ft) high. The building is believed to date to the Early Classic period (c. 250–600 CE).

Temple 30 (Structure 5D-30) is at the east end of the terrace of the North Acropolis; it is one of a trio of similar structures. The roof and vaulting has collapsed, filling the three summit chambers with rubble. Temple 30 is estimated to date from the Early Classic (c. AD 250–600), based upon a stylistic comparison with other structures at Tikal. As with the other temples of the trio, the basal platform of the temple stands 3.5 metres (11 ft) high and the superstructure walls measure 2.3 metres (7.5 ft) high.

Temple 31 (Structure 5D-31) is one of a trio of similar structures at the east end of the terrace, together with Temples 29 and 30. As with the other two temples of the trio, the summit superstructure had three chambers; these have been buried under the rubble resulting from the collapse of the vaulting and roof. The temple is believed to date to the Early Classic (c. 250–600 CE). The height of the temple is identical to those of the other temples in the trio, with a basal platform measuring 3.5 metres (11 ft) high and superstructure walls standing 2.3 metres (7.5 ft) high.

Temple 32 (Structure 5D-32) stands immediately to the east of Temple 33. It was partially investigated in the mid-1960s and dates to the first half of the 7th century CE. The temple shrine contained three large chambers, which were looted soon after the abandonment of the city in the 10th century. Archaeologists discovered a tomb cut into the bedrock under the pyramid, which contained a royal burial (Burial 195). The pyramid was built over the tomb soon after the king's burial and consisted of a single construction phase.

Temple 33 (Structure 5D-33) was the 33-metre-high (108 ft) funerary pyramid of 5th-century king Siyaj Chan K'awiil II. It was centrally situated between Temples 32 and 34, in the front row of structures facing onto the Great Plaza; it is one of the most thoroughly explored temples in the entire Maya area. Over the course of two centuries the temple underwent three construction phases; the final phase of development took place during the Tikal Hiatus, which lasted from 562 to 692 CE. The last construction phase of Temple 33 served as a prototype for Temple I on the Great Plaza. This final version of Temple 33 was controversially dismantled by archaeologists in 1965 in order to arrive at the earlier stages of construction.

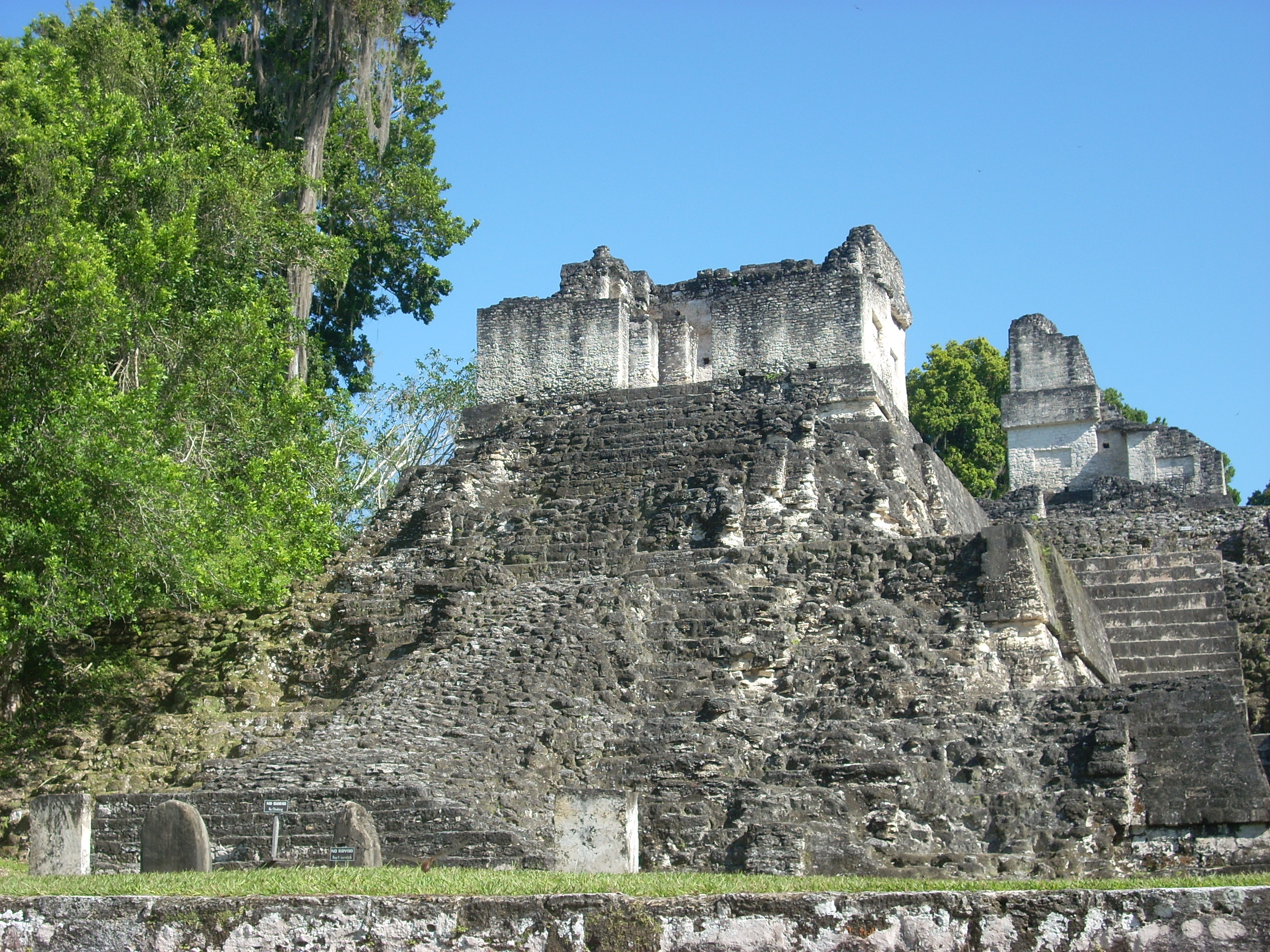
Temple 34

Temple 34 (Structure 5D-34) was the first pyramid to be built along the front terrace of the North Acropolis; it dates to the Early Classic period. The pyramid was built by Siyaj Chan K'awiil II over the tomb of his father, Yax Nuun Ayiin I. It was topped by a three chambered shrine with the rooms situated one behind the other. Archaeologists cut a trench across Temple 34 in 1959 and discovered the tomb cut into the bedrock underneath, with two previous versions of the temple built over it. Stela 26 originally stood at the foot of this temple but was broken, probably at the beginning of the Late Classic period, and dragged up the temple steps and placed under a masonry altar within the summit shrine. The shrine was looted in the Postclassic period and the altar was broken at this time. Ceremonial fires for the burning of inanimate sacrifices were lit directly above Yax Nuun Ayiin's tomb well into the Late Classic period and may be indicative of continued ancestor worship centuries after the king's death.

Temple 35 (Structure 5D-35) was a tall Late Classic temple backing against the southwest corner of the basal platform. It is the westernmost of the row of pyramids facing south onto the Great Plaza; it has not been explored by archaeologists and is considered to be one of two likely locations for the tomb of 7th-century king Nuun Ujol Chaak.

== Monuments ==
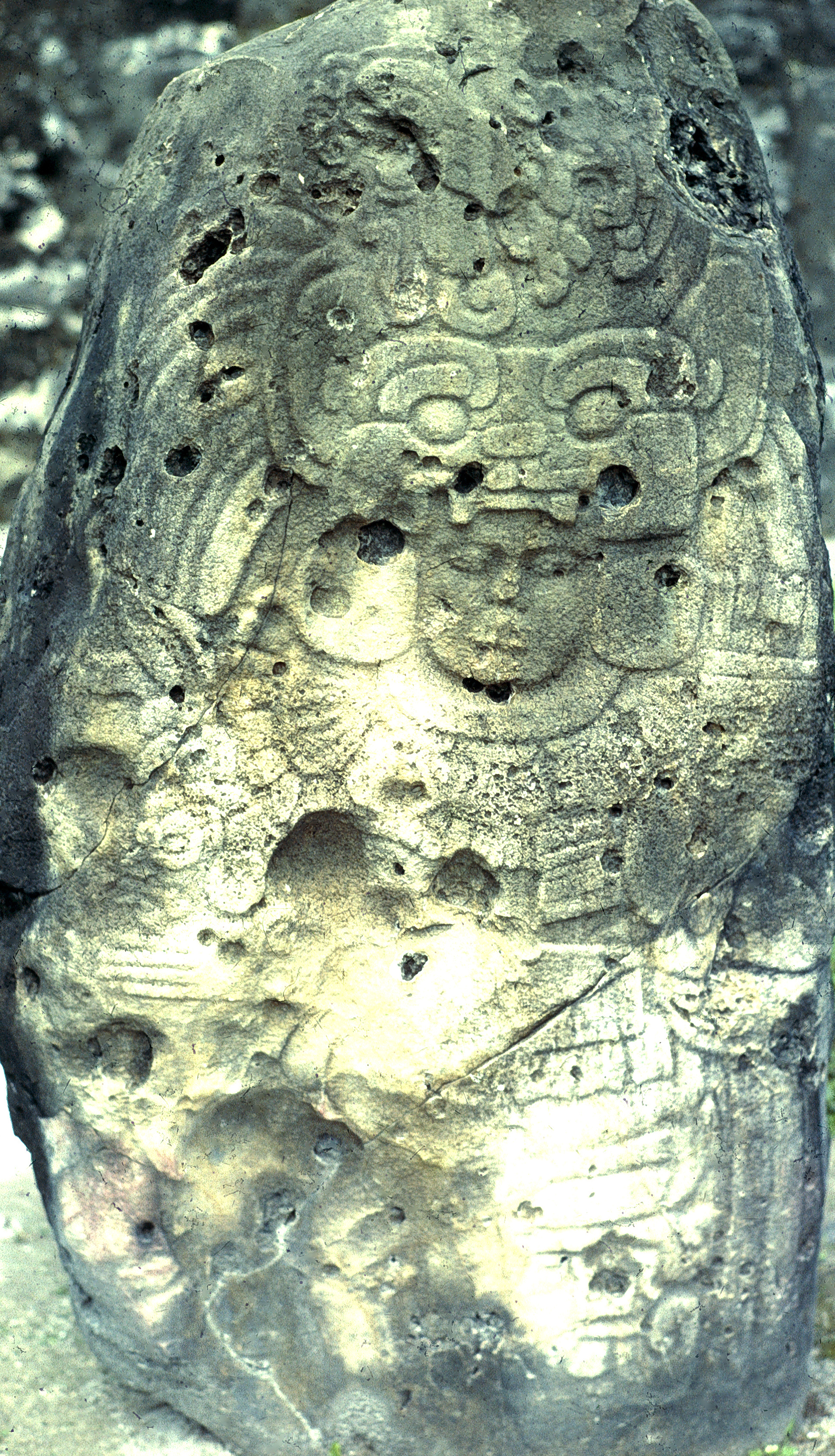
Stela 4 depicts Yax Nuun Ayiin I in central Mexican-style costume

A great many stelae were erected in the North Acropolis; by the 9th century CE there were a total of 43 stelae and 30 altars. Eighteen of these monuments were sculpted with hieroglyphic texts and royal portraits.

Stela 4 was erected by king Yax Nuun Ayiin I to celebrate the k'atun-ending of 396 CE. It is one of two stelae from Yax Nuun Ayiin I's reign and was re-erected at the base of his funerary pyramid, Temple 34. The stela displays a mix of Maya and Teotihuacan qualities, and deities from both cultures. It has a portrait of the king with the Underworld Jaguar God under one arm and the Mexican Tlaloc under the other. His helmet is a simplified version of the Teotihuacan War Serpent. Unusually for Maya sculpture, but typically for Teotihuacan, Yax Nuun Ayiin is depicted with a frontal face, rather than in profile.

Stela 18 was one of two stelae erected by Yax Nuun Ayiin I to celebrate the k'atun-ending of 396 CE. It was re-erected at the base of Temple 34, his funerary shrine.

Stela 26 was found in the summit shrine of Temple 34, underneath a broken masonry altar. The monument had originally been erected at the base of the temple during the Early Classic period and was later broken, probably at the beginning of the Late Classic. Its remains were then interred within the temple shrine.

Stela 31 is the upper portion of a monument that was broken and interred above the tomb of Siyaj Chan K'awiil II in Temple 33. It was dedicated in 445 CE and bears images of Siyaj Chan K'awiil II and his father Yax Nuun Ayiin I, who is depicted as a Teotihuacano warrior on the sides of the monument. The back of the stela is sculpted with a long hieroglyphic text legitimising Siyaj Chan K'awiil II's dynasty.

Stela 40 was found at the base of Temple 29. It has been dated to 468 CE and depicts 5th-century king K'an Chitam. He is holding up a Teotihuacan-style headdress in one hand. The sides of the monument are sculpted with depictions of his father, Siyaj Chan K'awill II, and his mother, Lady Ayiin. A lengthy hieroglyphic text on the back details his birth in 415, his promotion to a junior rank in 434 and his accession to the throne in 458, as well as a brief description of his father's reign.

Altar 19 was buried in the fill of the final version of Temple 33, immediately in front of the second version of the summit shrine. It was badly damaged and was broken into several pieces, and the majority of a sculpture depicting a seated person was chipped away. The three fragments were buried together in a way that paired the altar with the buried Stela 31; this may have maintained a relationship between the monuments that existed when they were originally on public display. The altar was crafted from limestone and is now in the site museum at Tikal. It has been dated to approximately 445 CE.

== Burials ==
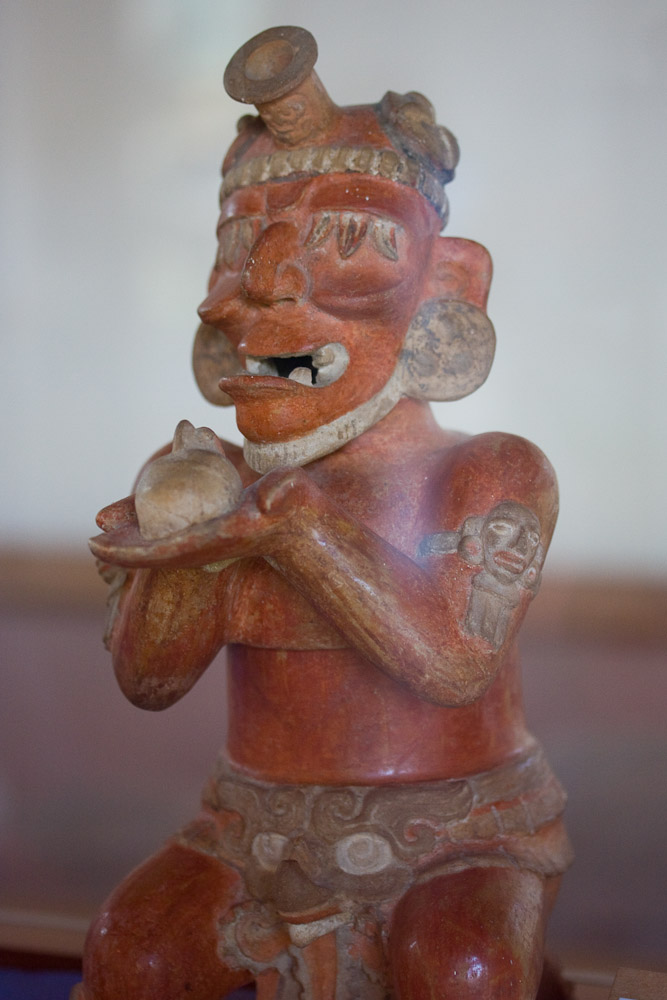
Ceramic effigy censer, representing a deity, found in Burial 10

Burial 10 was the tomb of late 4th-century king Yax Nuun Ayiin I. The tomb consists of a large chamber carved out of the bedrock beneath Temple 34. The remains of the king were interred upon a wooden bier and he was accompanied by nine human sacrifices and a headless caiman. The tomb contained a large quantity of grave goods, including an impressive array of ceramic vessels, many decorated with Teotihuacan-linked imagery. One ceramic drinking vessel bore the writing "the drinking vessel of the son of Spearthrower Owl". Five turtle shells of assorted sizes, some still attached to a rack, were the remains of a musical instrument similar to a marimba. A small jade ornament was also found, sculpted into the form of a caiman's head with a curled snout. The skull of the king was dyed red. The association of caimans with the king's remains related to an element of the king's name; ayiin means "crocodile" and the animal may have been the king's way (spirit companion).

Burial 23 was a royal tomb inserted by destroying the second version of the access stairway of Temple 33. The individual interred within the tomb has not been identified but the tomb is one of two proposed locations for the burial of the late 7th-century king Nuun Ujol Chaak. The tomb was cut into the bedrock under the temple, to the south of the burial of Siyaj Chan K'awiil II. The king appears to have been hastily interred in a tomb that was still being prepared while the burial took place, since plaster from the walls was splashed on some of the grave goods and a flint pick was accidentally left behind by a workman. The body of the king was laid upon a litter painted with cinnabar and overlain with jaguar-pelts; the corpse was laid out on the pelts and covered in layers of marine shells.

Burial 24 was an elite status burial inserted into the rubble core of Temple 33 during the final phase of the pyramid's construction. The tomb contained painted ceramic dishes that appear to name Nuun Ujol Chaak's father and grandfather, who both preceded him as rulers of the city.

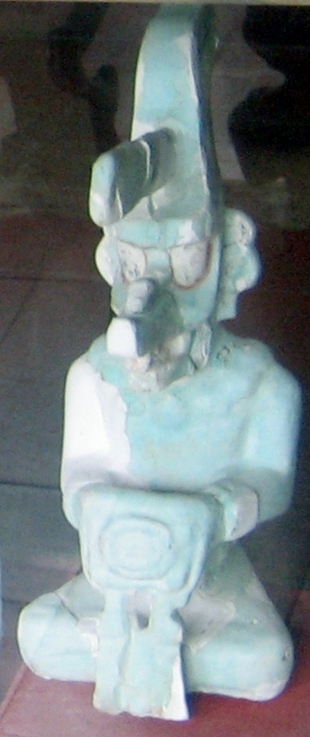
Effigy of K'awiil from Burial 195

Burial 48 was carved from the bedrock under the terrace, upon the central north–south axis of the North Acopolis directly under Temple 33; it has been identified as the tomb of king Siyaj Chan K'awiil II. The remains of the king were flanked those of two juvenile human sacrifices; one of these was a child and one was an adolescent. The walls of the tomb were coated in stucco, onto which were painted hieroglyphs indicating that the tomb was sealed in March 457, a year after the king had died. The king was interred bundled in a seated position and his remains lacked the skull, hands, and femurs. Grave goods included 27 ceramic vessels of mixed of local and imported origin, stone and shell artefacts including a well-used stone metate and accompanying handstone, a large quantity of jade artefacts, including jade discs and hundreds of beads that once formed a semicircular collar, two pairs of earspools and a great many more beads in small groups that did not form a part of the collar. Two obsidian blades also accompanied the burial.

Burial 85 dates to the 1st century CE, in the Late Preclassic, and was enclosed by a platform, with a primitive corbel vault. It was the first royal burial that characterised the shift in ceremonial focus from the Mundo Perdido complex to the North Acropolis. The tomb was centrally located upon the north–south axis of the North Acropolis, under what would later become Temple 26, and contained a single male skeleton, which lacked a skull and its thighbones. The dynastic founder of Tikal, Yax Ehb Xook, has been linked to this tomb, which lies deep in the heart of the North Acropolis. The deceased had probably died in battle with his body being mutilated by his enemies before being recovered and interred by his followers. The bones were wrapped carefully in textiles to form an upright bundle. The missing head was replaced by a small greenstone mask with shell-inlaid teeth and eyes and bearing a three-pointed royal headband. This head wears an emblem of rulership on its forehead and is a rare Preclassic lowland Maya portrait of a king. Among the contents of the tomb were a stingray spine, a spondylus shell and twenty-six ceramic vessels.

Burial 125 is another tomb that has been tentatively identified as that of dynastic founder Yax Ehb' Xook. It has been dated to around 90 CE. A cache was interred 6 metres (20 ft) to the east that may contain the grave goods associated with this burial, since the remains themselves had no directly associated artefacts. The cache contained high status ceramics and jade, shell and bone artefacts. The interment of this burial established a new central axis for the acropolis that was used as a point of reference for most of the royal burials up to the 8th century CE.

Burial 195 was a corbel-vaulted chamber cut into the bedrock under Temple 32. It was the tomb of the ruler nicknamed "Animal Skull" by archaeologists, who ruled from the end of the 6th century CE through to at least 628. The remains of the king had been wrapped in cloth that had been dyed red. The tomb was flooded soon after it was sealed, leaving a thick layer of mud that dried to preserve the hollow forms of the king's burial offerings long after the wooden artefacts had rotted away. Archaeologists filled these hollows with plaster of Paris and were thus able to reconstruct many of the perishable items from the tomb, including four large carved panels depicting the king, a small throne decorated with hieroglyphs, a ballgame yoke and four stucco figurines of the deity K'awiil.

Burial 200 was the 6th-century tomb of king Wak Chan K'awiil. It was a masonry tomb contained within Temple 22.
