= Tikal Temple 33 =

Dismantled Maya pyramid

Coordinates: 17.222546°N 89.623507°W

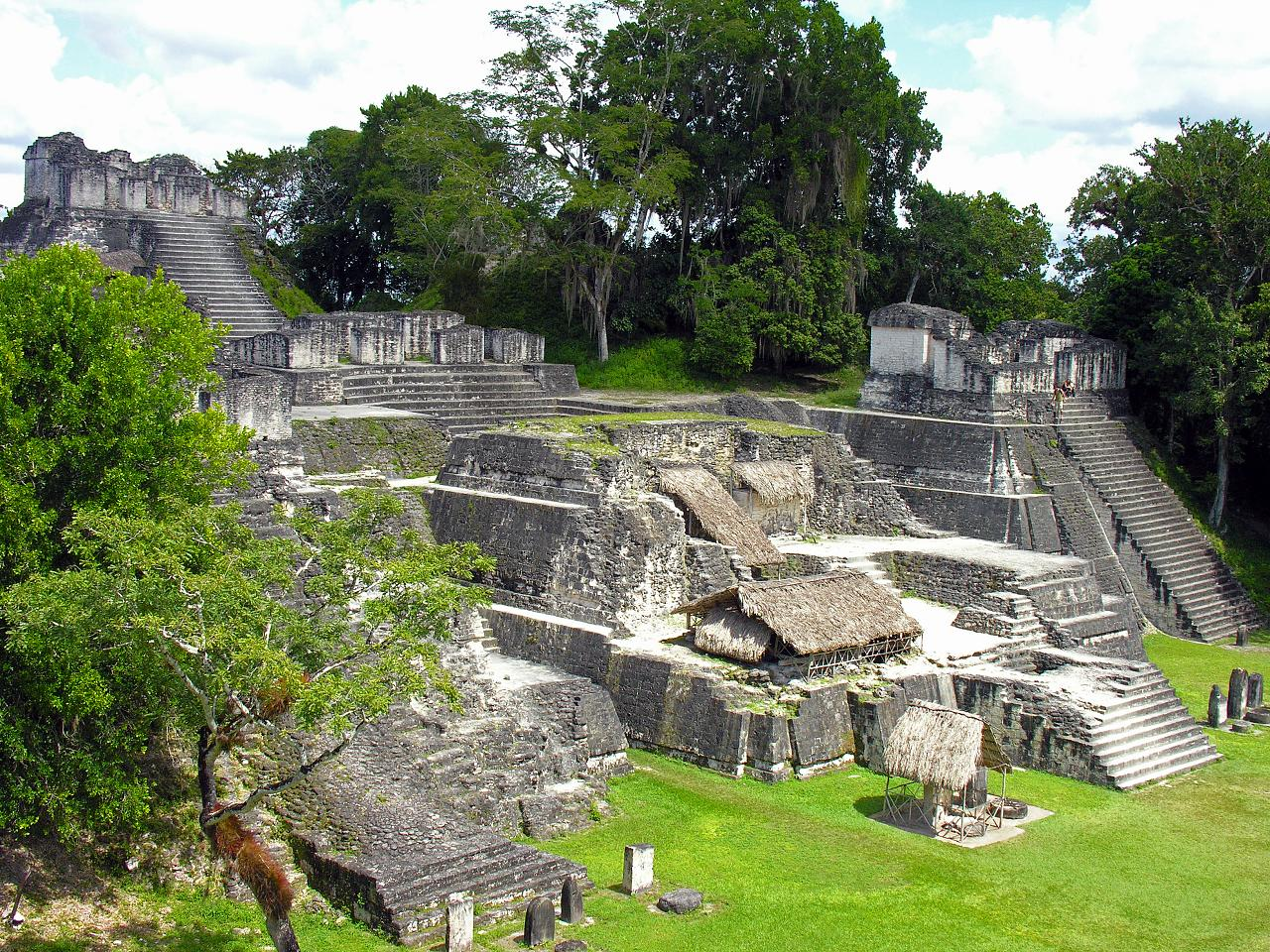
- Only the base of Temple 33 now survives

- Location within Guatemala
- Periods: Early Classic
- Cultures: Maya civilization
- Location: Flores
- Region: Petén Department, Guatemala

History
- Built: AD 457

Site notes
- Architectural style: Early Classic Maya Number of temples: 1
- Excavation dates: 1965
- Archaeologists: William R. Coe

Tikal Temple 33 (referred to in archaeological reports as 5D-33) was a 33-metre-high (108 ft) ancient Maya funerary pyramid located in the North Acropolis of the great Maya city of Tikal. The pyramid was centrally situated in the front row of structures facing onto the Great Plaza, between Temples 32 and 34 and in front of the Northern Platform. Temple 33 is one of the most thoroughly explored temples in the entire Maya area. The earliest version was a low funerary shrine over the tomb of king Siyaj Chan K'awiil II, which was sealed in AD 457. Temple 33 underwent three consecutive phases of construction, during which the king's funerary shrine was remodelled and one of his stelae was interred above his tomb. In the mid-1960s, archaeologists completely dismantled the final version of the large pyramid, uncovering the earlier phases of construction.

== Construction history ==
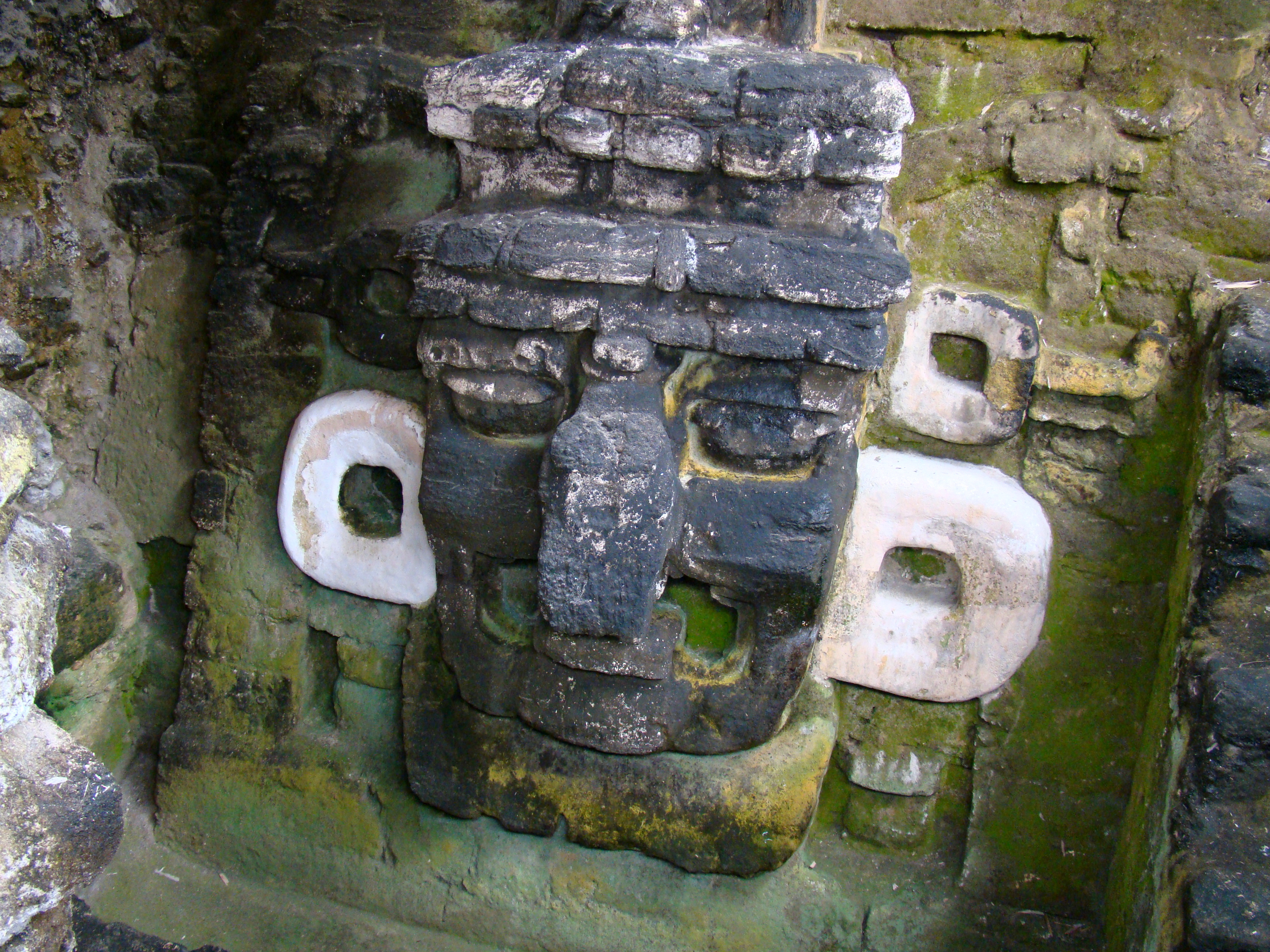
Giant mask from the west side of the second version of Temple 33

Temple 33 was the funerary monument of Siyaj Chan K'awiil II, a 5th-century king of Tikal; it was built directly over his tomb, which was cut into the underlying bedrock. The pyramid underwent three distinct construction phases over the course of two centuries. The three phases of construction were labelled by archaeologists 33-1 (the final version), 33-2 (the intermediate version) and 33-3 (the original Early Classic shrine).

The first phase of construction consisted of a wide basal platform built as a mortuary shrine on top of the tomb. It featured large stucco masks measuring over 3 metres (9.8 ft) high that flanked the access stairway. The second phase took place not long after the first and involved building a new superstructure upon the basal platform, with the addition of new stucco masks and panelling. The walls of the shrine were covered with Early Classic period graffiti, including both figures and hieroglyphs. The interior of the shrine was thinly coated with soot, some of the graffiti had been etched into the sooty covering, whilst more was discovered carved into the plaster underneath the soot deposit.

The third and final phase of development took place during the Tikal Hiatus which lasted from AD 562 to 692. During this time Siyaj Chan K'awiil II's Stela 31 was hauled up into the second phase sanctuary and placed directly above the original tomb in a ceremony involving fire and the breaking of pottery. A new pyramid was built over this to a height of 33 metres (108 ft), to contain a new, although unidentified, royal burial. Construction was paused for the interment of another elite burial, who was buried in the rubble core of the pyramid. When excavated in 1959 and 1960, the facing of Temple 33-1 was found to be badly damaged by the passing of time and the effects of the covering vegetation.

== Destruction ==
Temple 33-1 (the final version) was completely dismantled by archaeologists in order to arrive at the earlier stages of construction. The temple was destroyed in 1965 since the excavators judged that they had not the resources to restore it and they required infill material to cover a large trench that had been opened in the North Acropolis; the material stripped from Temple 33-1 was judged to be sufficient to fill it and this was an influential consideration when the archaeologists decided upon dismantling the structure. The dismantling operation was approved by the Guatemalan Instituto de Antropología e Historia (IDAEH) in 1964. The decision to destroy the pyramid was controversial; it was attacked by archaeologist Heinrich Berlin in an article in 1967; Berlin questioned why the pyramid was uncovered if the resources were not available to restore it and observed that the pyramid was in no worse shape than others that had been fully restored. He also attacked the decision to dismantle a pyramid for infill in an area where potential infill material was plentiful. Berlin complained directly to the director of the IDAEH in 1966. The director responded that the destruction was authorised by the institute and that IDAEH supported the actions of the excavators. The excavators published a response to Berlin in which they stood by their original decision and affirmed that much had been learnt from the dismantling of the structure, including construction methods that were probably similar to those used in other Late Classic pyramids and the clarification of the stratigraphic sequence of Tikal. English Mayanist J. Eric Thompson contextualized the actions of the excavators by stating "...even granting partial demolition was a wrong decision, the loss to mankind is not too serious."

== Monuments ==
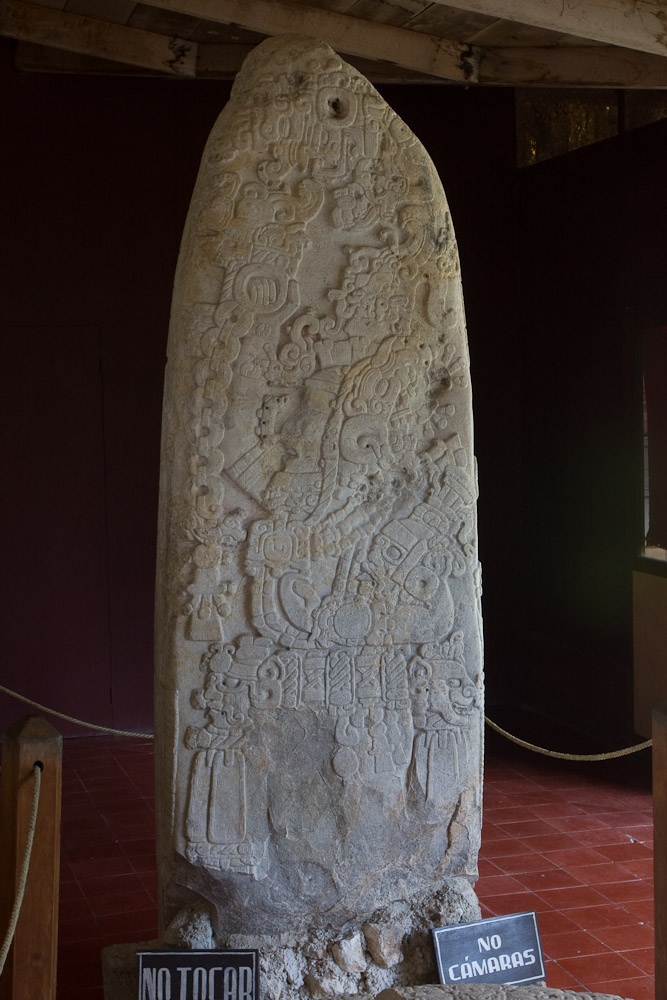
Stela 31 was buried above the tomb of king Siyaj Chan K'awiil II

Stela 31 was entombed above the remains of Siyaj Chan K'awiil II during the third phase of construction, when it was moved to a new resting place within the second phase shrine. The monument consists of the upper two-thirds of the original stela, which was broken prior to being re-erected in its new location. Stela 31 was dedicated in AD 445 and depicts Siyaj Chan K'awiil II with his symbols of rulership; his father Yax Nuun Ayiin I is depicted in three places upon the monument. It was sculpted in a deliberately archaic style and copied its form from Stela 29, erected a century and a half earlier. The stela shows strong Teotihuacan influence, with Siyaj Chan K'awiil II adorned with a Teotihuacan emblem. Yax Nuun Ayiin is sculpted on both sides of the monument, flanking his son upon the front; Yax Nuun Ayiin is depicted as a Teotihuacano warrior. Siyaj Chan K'awiil's father is also depicted hovering above him on the front of the monument; here he is depicted in fully Maya style as the ancestral sun god. The rear face of the stela is carved with a lengthy hieroglyphic text that legitimises Siyaj Chan K'awiil's right to rule through his mother's line and the foundation of the new Teotihuacan-linked dynasty; it briefly mentions Siyaj Chan K'awiil's accession, the baktun ending of 435, the monument's dedication and the death of the king's grandfather Spearthrower Owl in 439.

Altar 19 was buried in the fill of the final version of Temple 33, immediately in front of the second version of the shrine. The altar was badly damaged, having been broken into three pieces, and the majority of a sculpture depicting a seated person was chipped away. The three fragments were buried together in a way that paired the altar with the buried Stela 31; this may have maintained a relationship between the two monuments that existed when they were originally on public display. The altar was crafted from limestone and is now in the site museum at Tikal. It has been dated to approximately AD 445.

== Burials ==
Three burials were identified within Temple 33:

Burial 23 was a royal tomb inserted by destroying the second phase access stairway to the shrine. The individual interred within the tomb has not been identified but the tomb is one of two proposed locations for the burial of the late 7th-century king Nuun Ujol Chaak. The tomb was cut into the bedrock under the temple, to the south of the burial of Siyaj Chan K'awiil II. The king appears to have been hastily interred in a tomb that was still being prepared while the burial took place, since plaster from the walls was splashed on some of the grave goods and a flint pick was accidentally left behind by a workman. The body of the king was laid upon a litter painted with cinnabar and overlain with jaguar-pelts; the corpse was laid out on the pelts and covered in layers of marine shells.

Burial 24 was an elite status burial inserted into the rubble core of the pyramid during the third phase of construction.

Burial 48 was the tomb of king Siyaj Chan K'awiil II, carved from the bedrock. The tomb was placed upon the central axis of the North Acropolis and was accompanied by two human sacrifices. The walls of the rock tomb were painted with hieroglyphs that locate the chamber in the divine otherworld and includes a completion date of March 457, a year after the death of the king. The remains of the king were bundled together in a seated position and lacked the skull, hands, and femurs. The two sacrificed individuals were a child and an adolescent, with each being placed on opposite sides of the chamber, flanking the dead king. The positioning of the two individuals indicates that they were sacrificed before being placed within the tomb. The deceased were accompanied by 27 ceramic vessels; fragments of five were submitted for neutron activation analysis, which revealed a mix of local and imported pottery. Among all the Maya pottery was a single non-Maya offering, consisting of a black tripod cylinder vessel that was decorated with Teotihuacan-style imagery. Although the vessel was of pure Teotihuacan style, its lid was of mixed Teotihuacan-Maya form and was probably manufactured locally to fit the foreign import. Other offerings included stone and shell artefacts, including a well-used stone metate and accompanying handstone. A large quantity of jade artefacts were found in the tomb, including jade discs and hundreds of beads that once formed a semicircular collar, two pairs of earspools and a great many more beads in small groups that did not form a part of the collar. Two obsidian blades also accompanied the burial.

The tomb was cut via a horizontal shaft accessed through a stairway leading down from the lowest terrace of the North Acropolis; the walls were coated with stucco, onto which the hieroglyphs were painted as frescos. The horizontal shaft was sealed with limestone masonry once the king had been interred. The shaft was tunnelled 2.1 metres (7 ft) down below the terrace and the tomb chamber measured 30 by 16 feet (9 by 5 m) (NS by EW), forming a rounded rectangle.
