= Moryang =

Korean name
- Hangul: 모량
- Hanja: 慕良
- Revised Romanization: Moryang
- McCune–Reischauer: Moryang

Moyang (Korean: 모량; Hanja: 慕良) was a Korean wife of Jo Gwang, who was chief retainer of Gaya confederacy. Queen Hogu, who was a wife of Mapum of Geumgwan Gaya was Moryang's granddaughter. Moryang came along as an attendant of Heo Hwang-ok, who married into Gaya confederacy.

== Family ==
- Husband: Jo Gwang (Korean: 조광)
  - Ggranddaughter: Queen Hogu (Korean: 호구)
