= Queen Hogu =

Queen of Geumgwan Gaya

Hogu
- Queen consort of Geumgwan Gaya
- Spouse: Mapum of Geumgwan Gaya
- Issue: Geojilmi of Geumgwan Gaya

- Queen Hogu
- Hangul: 호구
- Hanja: 好仇
- Revised Romanization: Hogu
- McCune–Reischauer: Hoku

Queen Hogu (Korean: 호구; Hanja: 好仇) was the third wife of Mapum of Geumgwan Gaya. She bore the fourth ruler of the Gaya confederacy, Geojilmi of Geumgwan Gaya. She was the granddaughter of Jo Gwang, who was an attendant of Heo Hwang-ok for her marriage from India.

== Family ==
- Grandfather: Jo Gwang (Korean: 조광)
- Grandmother: Moryang (Korean: 모량)
  - Husband: Mapum of Geumgwan Gaya (Korean: 마품왕)
    - Son: Geojilmi of Geumgwan Gaya (Korean: 거질미왕)
