= Kim Muryŏk =

Korean general (518–579)

- Hangul: 김무력
- Hanja: 金武力
- RR: Gim Muryeok
- MR: Kim Muryŏk

Kim Muryŏk (518 – 16 October 579) was a Silla general under King Jinheung in the mid-6th century. The events of his life are known solely through a brief account in the 12th-century chronicle Samguk sagi. He was the second son of King Guhae, the last ruler of Geumgwan Gaya, who had joined his family with the true-bone elites of Silla. After his father's surrender in 532, Kim joined the Silla military at the high rank of gakgan. In 553, he led his army to seize the northeastern frontier of Paekche. After taking the area, Kim was made the military governor (군주; 軍主; gunju) of Sinju (신주; 新州). In 554, he met the Paekche armies at Gwansanseong Fortress (present-day Okcheon, South Korea), killing King Seong and four of his ministers, and taking some 29,000 prisoners.

Kim was also the grandfather of famed Silla general Kim Yu-sin.

== See also ==
- List of Silla people
- Three Kingdoms of Korea
