= Jo Gwang =

Korean name
- Hangul: 조광
- Hanja: 趙匡
- RR: Jo Gwang
- MR: Cho Kwang

Jo Gwang (Korean: 조광; Hanja: 趙匡) was chief retainer of Gaya confederacy. Queen Hogu who was a wife of Mapum of Geumgwan Gaya was his granddaughter. He served as government officer of Gaya confederacy. In 48, when Heo Hwang-ok came over from India to Gaya confederacy, he also came from India as an attendant of Heo Hwang-ok who married into Gaya confederacy.

== Family ==
- Consort: Moryang (Korean: 모량)
  - Granddaughter: Queen Hogu (Korean: 호구)
