= Geojilmi of Geumgwan Gaya =

- Hangul: 거질미왕; 금물왕
- Hanja: 居叱彌王; 金勿王
- RR: Geojilmiwang; Geummurwang
- MR: Kŏjilmiwang; Kŭmmurwang

Geojilmi of Geumgwan Gaya (died 346, r. 291–346) was the fourth ruler of Geumgwan Gaya, a Gaya state of ancient Korea. He was the son of King Mapum and Queen Hogu.

== Family ==
- Father: King Mapum (마품왕, 麻/馬品王)
- Mother: Lady Hogu (호구부인; 好仇夫人)
- Wife: Lady Aji (아지부인; 阿志夫人) – granddaughter of an agan named Agung.
  - Son: King Ipum (이시품왕; 伊尸品王)

== See also ==
- List of Korean monarchs
- History of Korea
- Gaya confederacy
- Three Kingdoms of Korea

== Notes ==
Preceded by Mapum of Geumgwan Gaya	King of Geumgwan Gaya; 291–346	Succeeded by Ipum of Geumgwan Gaya
