= Guhyeong of Geumgwan Gaya =

King of Geumgwan Gaya
- Reign: 521 – 532
- Predecessor: Gyeomji of Geumgwan Gaya
- Successor: Dynasty abolished (Beopheung of Silla as the King of Silla)
- Spouse: Lady Gyehwa
- House: Kim
- Father: Gyeomji of Geumgwan Gaya
- Mother: Lady Suk

- Guhyeong of Geumgwan Gaya
- Hangul: 구형왕; 구해왕
- Hanja: 仇衡王; 仇亥王
- RR: Guhyeongwang; Guhaewang
- MR: Kuhyŏngwang; Kuhaewang

Guhyeong of Geumgwan Gaya, also often Guhae (r. 521–532) was the tenth and final ruler of Geumgwan Gaya, a Gaya state of ancient Korea. He was the son of King Gyeomji and Queen Suk.

Faced with an onslaught of Silla forces under King Beopheung, King Guhyeong chose to surrender freely, and brought his family and his treasures to Silla. He was received with ceremony and his family were admitted to the second-highest rank of the Silla bone rank system, the "true bone." The king was given the rank of Sangdaedeung, and permitted to keep his former territory as sigeup stipend land. According to the Samguk yusa, this occurred either 520 or 490 years after the kingdom's legendary founding by King Suro.

== Family ==
- Father: King Gyeomji (겸지왕; 鉗知王)
- Mother: Lady Suk (숙부인; 淑夫人)
- Wife: Lady Gyehwa (계화부인; 桂花夫人) – daughter of a suijil named Bunjil (분질).
  - 1st son: Kim Sejong (김세종; 金世宗) – father of Kim Solji (김솔지; 金率支).
  - 2nd son: Kim Muryeok – father of Kim Seohyeon (김서현; 金舒玄).
  - 3rd son: Kim Mudeuk (김무득; 金武得) – father of Kim Changhyeon (김창현; 金昌玄).

== See also ==
- List of Korean monarchs
- History of Korea
- Gaya confederacy
- Three Kingdoms of Korea

== Notes ==
Preceded by Gyeomji	King of Geumgwan Gaya; 521–532	Succeeded by None
