= Jwaji of Geumgwan Gaya =

- Hangul: 좌지왕, 김질왕, or 김토
- Hanja: 坐知王, 金叱王, or 金吐
- Revised Romanization: Jwaji wang or Gimjil wang
- McCune–Reischauer: Chwaji wang or Kimjil wang

Jwaji (died 421) (r. 407–421) was the sixth ruler of Geumgwan Gaya, a Gaya state of ancient Korea. He was the son of King Ipum and Queen Jeongsin.

The Samguk yusa reports that he appointed the relatives of a favoured concubine (yong nyeo, 傭女) to high office, and that this led to political trouble. Furthermore, Silla took advantage of the kingdom's vulnerability and invaded. After the courtier Pak Won-do (朴元道) remonstrated with him, the king went to a fortuneteller, who read him an I Ching passage which indicated that he should destroy the heart of the problem. At that, he sent the concubine into exile and returned proper order to the court.

== Family ==
- Father: King Ipum (이품왕; 伊品王)
- Mother: Lady Jeongsin (정신부인; 貞信夫人)
- Wife: Lady Boksu (복수부인; 福壽夫人) – daughter of a daeagan named Doryeong (도령; 道寧).
  - Son: King Chwihui (취희왕; 吹希王)
- Concubine, from a palace lady (용녀; 傭女)

== See also ==
- List of Korean monarchs
- History of Korea
- Gaya confederacy
- Three Kingdoms of Korea

Preceded by Isipum	King of Geumgwan Gaya; 407–421	Succeeded by Chwihui
