= Isipum of Geumgwan Gaya =

5th king of Gaya (r. 346–407)

- Hangul: 이품왕; 이시품왕
- Hanja: 伊品王; 伊尸品王
- RR: Ipumwang; Isipumwang
- MR: Ip'umwang; Isip'umwang

Ipum of Geumgwan Gaya (died 407) (r. 346–407) was the fifth ruler of Geumgwan Gaya, a Gaya state of ancient Korea. He was the son of King Geojilmi and Queen Aji.

== Family ==
- Father: King Geojilmi (거질미왕; 居叱彌王)
- Mother: Lady Aji (아지부인; 阿志夫人)
- Wife: Lady Jeongsin (정신부인; 貞信夫人)
  - Son: King Jwaji (좌지왕; 坐知王)

== See also ==
- List of Korean monarchs
- History of Korea
- Gaya confederacy
- Three Kingdoms of Korea

== Notes ==
| Preceded by Geojilmi of Geumgwan Gaya | King of Geumgwan Gaya; 346–407 | Succeeded by Jwaji of Geumgwan Gaya |
