= Gyeomji of Geumgwan Gaya =

9th king of Gaya (r. 492–521)

- Hangul: 겸지왕; 금겸왕
- Hanja: 鉗知王; 金鉗王
- RR: Gyeomjiwang; Geumgyeomwang
- MR: Kyŏmjiwang; Kŭmgyŏmwang

Gyeomji of Geumgwan Gaya (r. 492–521) was the ninth ruler of Geumgwan Gaya, a Gaya state of ancient Korea. He was the son of King Jilji and Queen Bangwon.

== Family ==
- Father: King Jilji (질지왕; 銍知王)
- Mother: Lady Bangwon (방원부인; 邦媛夫人)
- Wife: Lady Suk (숙부인; 淑夫人) – daughter of a gakgan named Chulchung (출충; 出忠).
  - 1st son: King Guhyeong (구형왕; 仇衡王)
  - 2nd son: Gim Talji (김탈지; 金脫知)

== See also ==
- List of Korean monarchs
- History of Korea
- Gaya confederacy
- Three Kingdoms of Korea

== Notes ==
Preceded by Jilji	King of Geumgwan Gaya; 492–521	Succeeded by Guhyeong
