= Mapum of Geumgwan Gaya =

Mapum Wang 麻品王 마품왕
- King of Geumgwan Gaya
- Predecessor: Geodeung of Geumgwan Gaya
- Successor: Geojilmi of Geumgwan Gaya
- Died: 291
- Spouse: Hogu

- Mapum of Geumgwan Gaya
- Hangul: 마품왕
- Hanja: 麻品王; 馬品王
- RR: Mapumwang
- MR: Map'umwang

Mapum (died 291, r. 259–291) was king of Geumgwan Gaya, a member state of the Gaya confederacy in Korea. He was preceded by his father, King Geodeung and succeeded by his son King Geojilmi.

Like the other members of the Geumgwan royal line, his surname was Kim. Mapum married Queen Hogu, who was the granddaughter of the high official Jo Gwang.

== Family ==
- Father: King Geodeung (거등왕; 居登王)
- Mother: Lady Mojeong (모정부인; 慕貞夫人)
- Wife: Lady Hogu (호구부인; 好仇夫人) – granddaughter of Jo Gwang (조광; 趙匡).
  - Son: King Geojilmi (거질미왕; 居叱彌王)

== See also ==
- List of Korean monarchs
- History of Korea
- Three Kingdoms of Korea

Preceded by Geodeung	King of Gaya; 259–291	Succeeded by Geojilmi
