= Jilji of Geumgwan Gaya =

- Hangul: 질지왕; 금질왕
- Hanja: 銍知王; 金銍王
- RR: Jiljiwang; Geumjirwang
- MR: Chilchiwang; Kŭmjirwang

Jilji of Geumgwan Gaya (died 492) (r. 451–492) was the eighth ruler of Geumgwan Gaya, a Gaya state of ancient Korea. He was the son of King Chwihui and Queen Indeok.

A passage in the Samguk yusa indicates that he built a Buddhist temple for the ancestral queen Heo Hwang-ok on the spot where she and King Suro were married. He called the temple Wanghusa ("the Queen's temple", 王后寺) and provided it with ten gyeol of stipend land. The temple reportedly endured for five hundred years. A gyeol or kyŏl (결 or 結), varied in size from 2.2 acres to 9 acres (8,903–36,422 m2) depending upon the fertility of the land.

== Family ==
- Father: King Chwihui (취희왕; 吹希王)
- Mother: Lady Indeok (인덕부인; 仁德夫人)
- Wife: Lady Bangwon (방원부인; 邦媛夫人) – daughter of a sagan named Gimsang (김상; 金相).
  - Son: King Gyeomji (겸지왕; 鉗知王)

== See also ==
- List of Korean monarchs
- History of Korea
- Gaya confederacy
- Three Kingdoms of Korea

== Notes ==
| Preceded by Chwihui | King of Geumgwan Gaya; 451–492 | Succeeded by Gyeomji |
