= Chwihui of Geumgwan Gaya =

5th-century Korean ruler

- Hangul: 취희왕; 질가왕
- Hanja: 吹希王; 叱嘉王
- RR: Chwihuiwang; Jilgawang
- MR: Ch'wihŭiwang; Chilgawang

Chwihui of Geumgwan Gaya (died 451) (r. 421–451) was the seventh ruler of Geumgwan Gaya, a Gaya state of ancient Korea. He was the son of King Jwaji and Queen Boksu.

== Family ==
- Father: King Jwaji (좌지왕; 坐知王)
- Mother: Lady Boksu (복수부인; 福壽夫人)
- Wife: Lady Indeok (인덕부인; 仁德夫人) – daughter of a gakgan named Jinsa (진사; 進思).
  - Son: King Jilji (질지왕; 銍知王)

== See also ==
- List of Korean monarchs
- History of Korea
- Gaya confederacy
- Three Kingdoms of Korea

== Notes ==
Preceded by Jwaji	King of Geumgwan Gaya; 421–451	Succeeded by Jilji
