= Kʼan Chitam =

- Ajaw
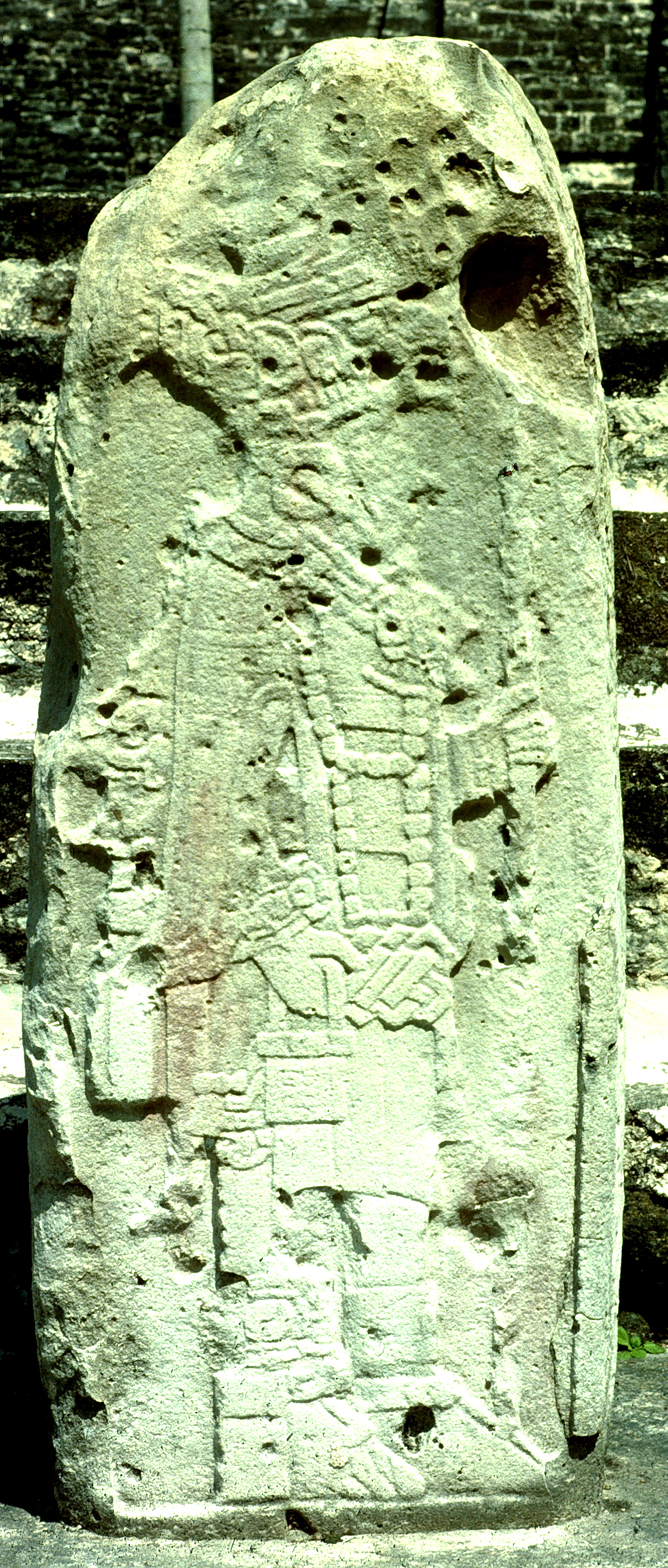
- Kʼan Chitam's portrait in Stela 13

King of Tikal
- Reign: 8 August 458 - 486?
- Predecessor: Sihyaj Chan Kʼawiil II
- Successor: Chak Tok Ichʼaak II
- Born: 26 November 415; Tikal
- Died: 486? Tikal
- Spouse: Lady Tzutz Nik of Naranjo
- Issue: Chak Tok Ichʼaak II
- Father: Sihyaj Chan Kʼawiil II
- Mother: Lady Ahiin
- Religion: Maya religion

Kʼan Chitam, (Note: The ruler's name, when transcribed is (KʼAN)CHITAM?, translated "Precious/Yellow Peccary", Martin & Grube 2008, p.37.) also known as Kan Boar and Kʼan Ak (November 26, 415? – 486?), was an ajaw of the Maya city of Tikal. He took the throne on 8 August 458. (Note: These are the dates indicated on the Maya inscriptions in Mesoamerican Long Count calendar, Birth: 8.18.19.12.1 8 Imix 14 Sak and Accession: 9.1.2.17.17 4 Kaban 15 Xul, Martin & Grube 2008, p.37.) He was son of Sihyaj Chan Kʼawiil II and Lady Ahiin. He married Lady Tzutz Nik, daughter of Tzik'in Bahlam, ruler of Naranjo. The monuments associated with Kʼan Chitam are Stelae 2?, 9, 13 and 40.

== Footnotes ==
Regnal titles
Preceded by Sihyaj Chan Kʼawiil II	Ajaw of Tikal; August 8, 458-486?	Succeeded by Chak Tok Ichʼaak II
