= Sihyaj Chan Kʼawiil II =

Ajaw of the Maya city of Tikal

- Ajaw
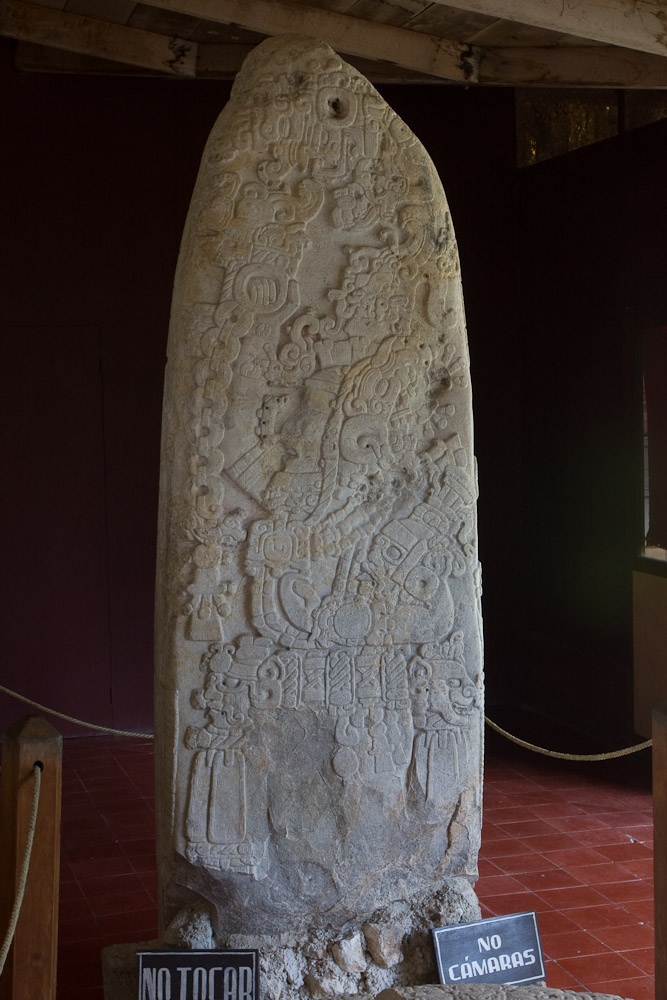
- Sihyaj Chan Kʼawiil II's portrait on Stela 31.

King of Tikal
- Reign: 26 November 411 - 3 February 456
- Predecessor: Yax Nuun Ahiin I
- Successor: Kʼan Chitam
- Died: 3 February 456; Tikal
- Burial: Temple 33 (Burial 48)
- Spouse: Lady Ahiin
- Issue: Kʼan Chitam, King of Tikal; Six Sky, King of Río Azul
- Father: Yax Nuun Ahiin I
- Mother: Lady Kʼinich
- Religion: Maya religion

Sihyaj Chan Kʼawiil II, (Note: The ruler's name, when transcribed is SIH-(Y)AJ-CHAN KʼAWI꞉L, translated "Sky-born Kʼawiil", Martin & Grube 2008, p.34.) also known as Storm Sky and Manikin Cleft Sky (died 3 February 456), was an ajaw of the Maya city of Tikal. He took the throne on 26 November 411 and reigned until his death. (Note: These are the dates indicated on the Maya inscriptions in Mesoamerican Long Count calendar, Accession: 8.18.15.11.0 3 Ajaw 13 Sak and Death: 9.1.0.8.0 10 Ajaw 13 Muwan, Martin & Grube 2008, p.34.) He was a son of his predecessor Yax Nuun Ahiin I and Lady Kʼinich, and a grandson of Spearthrower Owl. Stela 31, erected during his reign, describes the death of his grandfather in 439; other monuments associated with Sihyaj Chan Kʼawiil II are Stelae 1 and possibly Stelae 28. Tikal Temple 33 was Sihyaj Chan Kʼawiil II's funerary pyramid and his tomb was located beneath it.

== Footnotes ==
Regnal titles
| Preceded by Yax Nuun Ahiin I | Ajaw of Tikal; November 26, 411-February 3, 456 | Succeeded by Kʼan Chitam |
