= Geumgwan Gaya =

Former state in Korea

- Hangul: 금관가야
- Hanja: 金官伽倻
- RR: Geumgwan Gaya
- MR: Kŭmgwan Kaya

Alternate name
- Hangul: 본가야
- Hanja: 本伽倻
- RR: Bongaya
- MR: Pon'gaya

Alternate name
- Hangul: 가락국
- RR: Garakguk
- MR: Karakkuk

Geumgwan Gaya (Korean: 금관가야; Hanja: 金官伽倻), also known as Bongaya (본가야; 本伽倻; lit. 'original Gaya') or Garakguk (가락국), was the ruling city-state of the Gaya confederacy that existed from 43 to 532 CE, during the Three Kingdoms period, in Korea. It is believed to have been located around the modern-day city of Gimhae, Southern Gyeongsang province, near the mouth of the Nakdong River. Due to its geographic location, this kingdom played a dominant role in the regional affairs from the Byeonhan period onward to the end of the Gaya confederacy.

== Creation myth ==
The creation myth of Geumgwan Gaya is a myth about King Gim Suro, the progenitor of Geumgwan Gaya and the progenitor of the Gimhae Kim clan. This story is written in The Garak Gukgi (가락국기) of the "Samguk Yusa" Volume 2. This story tells that the six eggs turned into boys, and they became founders of each country of the Gaya confederacy.

=== History ===
It is the same as the 'Dangun Myth', 'The Myth of King Dongmyeong', and 'The Myth of Bak Hyeokgeose' in that it is a founding myth. However, it is different from the others in terms of the sequential structure of the biography leading to birth and death. 'The Myth of King Dongmyeong' and 'The Myth of Seok Talhae' are structured in the ordeal of birth due to paternal infidelity and the ordeal and struggle to become the founder of a nation. On the other hand, 'Bak Hyeokgeose Myth' and 'The Myth of King Suro' deny both paternal and maternal lineage, but they have no struggle to rise to the throne as the founder of a nation without going through the ordeal of birth. The former can be defined as 'the myth of the illegitimate child type' and the latter as the 'myth of the foster child type'. From this point of view, 'The Myth of King Suro' can be said to be a founding myth and a progenitor myth, as well as a myth that reflects the collective unconsciousness of the foster child.

=== Plot ===
After the beginning of the world, there were still no titles to call a country on this land, and there were no titles to call a king or a subject. However, there were nine gans: Adogan, Yeodogan, Pidogan, Odogan, Ryusugan, Ryucheongan, Sincheongan, Ocheongan, and Singuigan, and they became chiefs and led the people. There were 75,000 people in 100 households. Each of them lived together in the mountains and fields, dug wells, drank, and plowed the fields. In the third lunar month of the 18th year of Emperor Guangwu's reign in the late Han dynasty (A.D. 42, and the year of Linin (壬寅)), the Gyeyok event was held, which is a day when people gather at the water's edge to ward off evil in spring and autumn. There was a sign of something calling in a suspicious voice here in Bukguji, so a group of 200 to 300 people gathered. It sounded like a human voice, but it hid its form and said out loud, “Is anyone there?” Did the nine gan answered, “We are.” And the voice said again, "Where am I?" So they replied, “It is Guji.” He also said, “The reason God commanded me was to come here to renew the country and become king. That's why I came down here. You will hold a handful of soil from the top of the peak and sing a song and dance, then this will be the joy of jumping to meet the Great King."

Gujiga

Turtle, turtle
Put your head out
If you don't,
I'll roast you and eat you,

The nine gans enjoyed singing the song Gujiga and dancing as told. After a while, they looked up and saw a purple string hanging down from the sky and touching the ground. When they looked for the end of the string, they found a golden box wrapped in a red cloth. They opened the box, then there were six golden eggs round like the sun. The people were all amazed and delighted and bowed together countless times. After a while, they packed up the eggs again, returned to Adogan's house, put them on the table, and dispersed.

Twelve hours later, the next day, around dawn, the group gathered again and opened the box, and six eggs turned into boys whose faces were dignified. As soon as they sat down at the table, the crowd celebrated, bowed, and respected him wholeheartedly. They grew up day by day and passed ten days and nights. They were 9 feet tall, so they could be called Tang of Shang; their faces were like a dragon, so they could be called Emperor Gaozu of Han; their eyebrows were eight different colors, like that of Emperor Yao; their pupils were doubled, like those of Emperor Shun. The first of the six eggs which turned into a human, ascended the throne on the fifteenth day of the same month, and because it appeared first, it was named 'Suro' or 'Sureung,' and the country was called 'Daegarak' or 'Gayaguk,' which is one of the six Gaya countries. The remaining five became the heads of the five Gaya.

=== Analysis ===
Historical research to reconstruct the history of Garakguk, literary research centered on the interpretation of 'Gujiga (구지가, 龜旨歌)', and folklore research to explain in relation to ancient rituals were conducted. In terms of literature, above all, research was conducted to clarify the literary value of 'The Myth of King Gim Suro' by examining the entire context of the myth, the surface layer and depth of the text, and the entire type of founding myth. There are studies that revealed the fact that 'The Myth of King Gim Suro' is an oral correlate of the coronation ceremony of kings and that 'Gujiga' is an exorcism song for a ritual to ward off disaster, and there are studies on the specificity of the narrative principle of myths, and studies on the ritual structure of 'The Myth of King Gim Suro' in the context of the ritual narrative structure of the founding myth. The psychological approach to 'The Myth of King Gim Suro' is further diversifying the layers of meaning, and in particular, recently, studies on storytelling methods for cultural content have been conducted, and the current significance of the myth is being newly illuminated.

== Rise of the kingdom ==
Gaya confederacy (42–532 CE), founded by the King Suro, originated from the Byeonhan (also called Pyonhan, Byeon and Byeonjin) tribe, and it had 12 statelets. Byeonhan was one of the 3 Samhan, other 2 being Jinhan and Mahan. According to the Samguk Yusa, Geumgwan Kaya was made of 9 villages united by King Suro of Gaya. His wife and queen, Heo Hwang-ok, whom he married in 48 AD, is believed to be from an Ayuta kingdom. As a confederacy of city states, Gaya rose to prosperity due to sea port trade with Japan and other states as well as land trade with China in the north. Daegaya was an important city state and sea port as part of the Gaya Confederacy, it is associated with the place the Queen Heo had first arrived in Korea from her foreign location.

During this early time in the history of Gaya, several waves of migration from the north, including the earlier-extant Gojoseon, Buyeo, and the Goguryeo, arrived and integrated with existing populations and stimulated cultural and political developments. A sharp break in burial styles is found in archaeological sites dated near the late 3rd century AD, when these migrations are to have taken place. Burial forms associated with North Asian nomadic peoples, such as the burial of horses with the dead, suddenly replace earlier forms in the tombs of the elite. In addition, evidence exists indicating that earlier burials were systematically destroyed. In the early 1990s, a royal tomb complex was unearthed in Daeseong-dong, Gimhae, attributed to Geumgwan Gaya but apparently used since Byeonhan times.

According to the Records of the Three Kingdoms, It is presumed the four countries, Sinunsin (Korean: 臣雲遣支報, Anra (安邪踧支濆), Sinbunhwal (臣離兒不例) and Geumgwan (拘邪秦支廉), had a superior position in the southern peninsula around the 3rd century.

== List of kings ==
In chronological order:

- Geumgwan Gaya (lit. Gaya Confederacy) or Bon Gaya (lit. Original Gaya) era
1. King Suro
2. King Geodeung
3. King Mapum
4. King Geojilmi
5. King Isipum
6. King Jwaji
7. King Chwihui
8. King Jilji
9. King Gyeomji
10. King Guhyeoung

== Decline ==
Geumgwan Gaya declined due to the wars with Japan and the tribes in the north. Its various constituent city statelets fell one by one to Silla. After Geumgwan Gaya capitulated to Silla in 532 AD, its royal house was accepted into the Sillan aristocracy (perhaps because by that time, a major house of Silla, of the Gyeongju Kim clan, was related to the Gaya royal house, which was the Gimhae Kim clan) and given the rank of "true bone," the second-highest level of the Silla bone rank system. General Kim Yu-sin of Silla (also of the Gimhae Kim clan) was a descendant of the last king of Gaya.

== Gallery ==
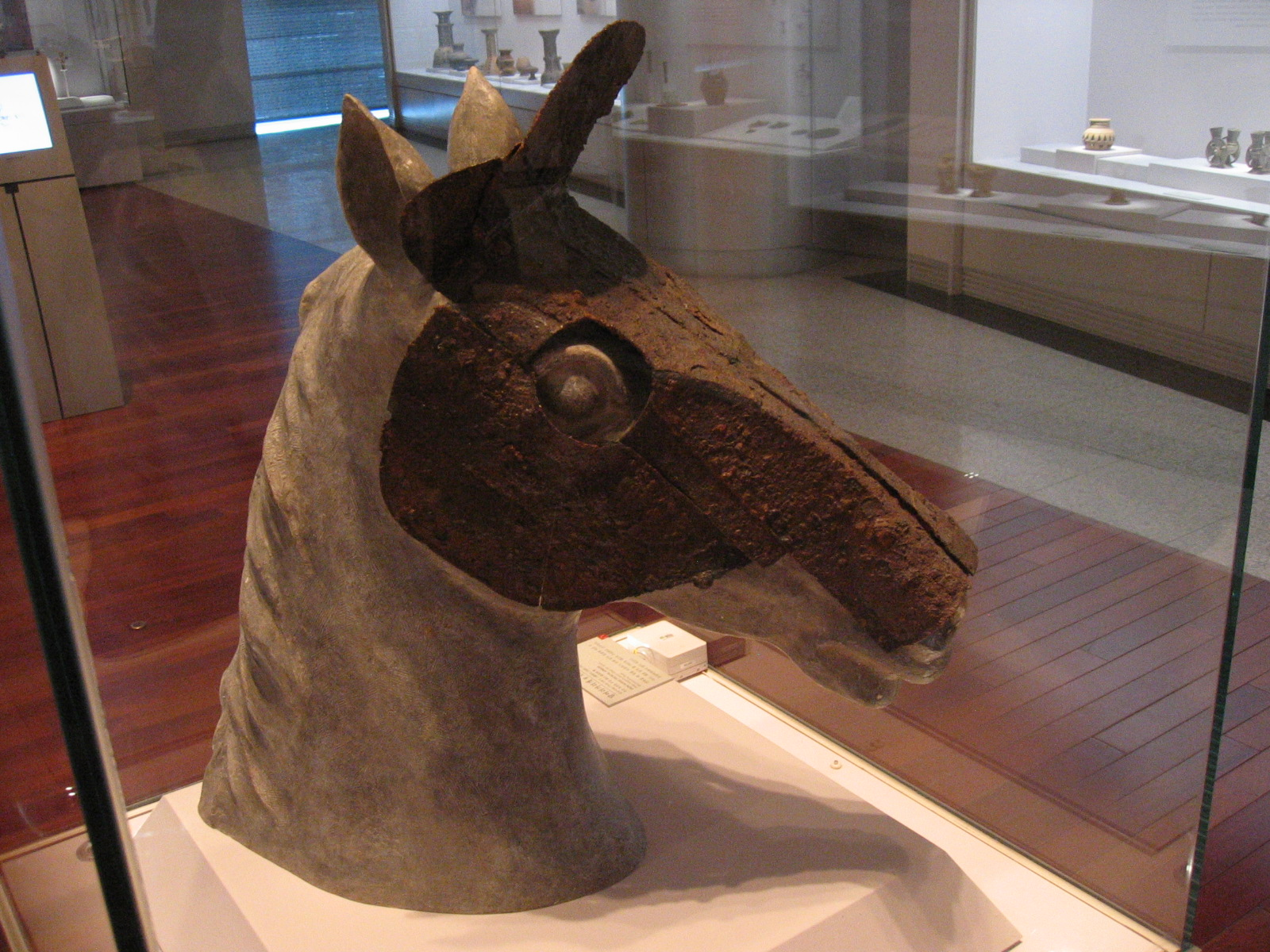
Gaya horse armour

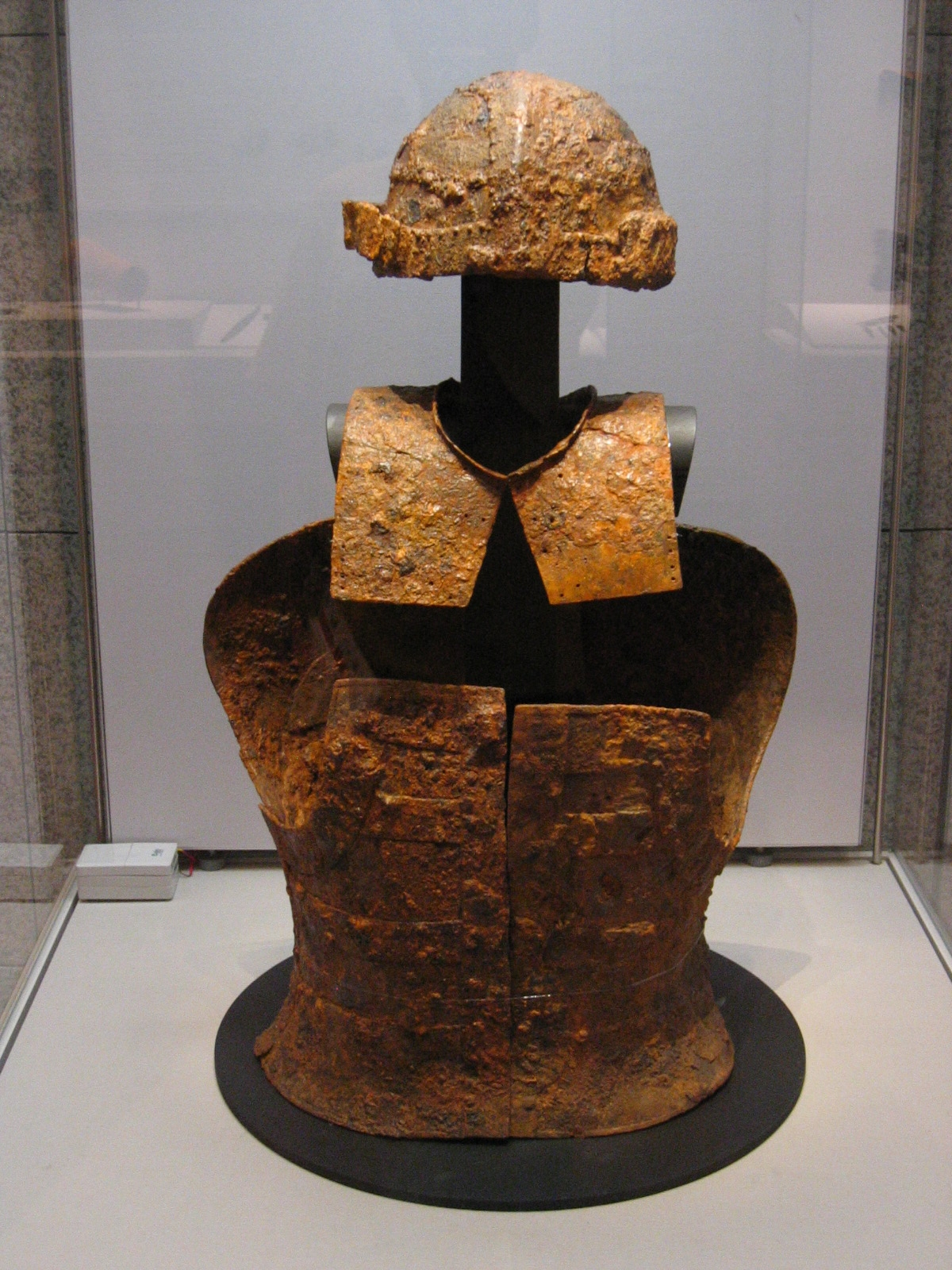
Gaya armour

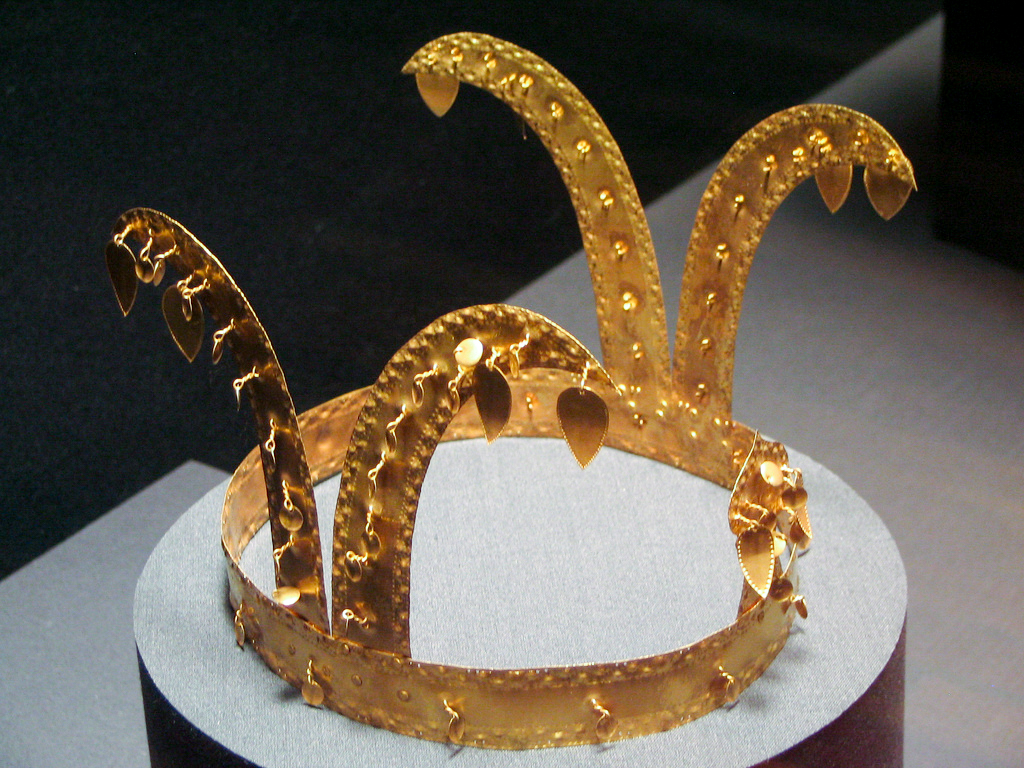
Gaya crown

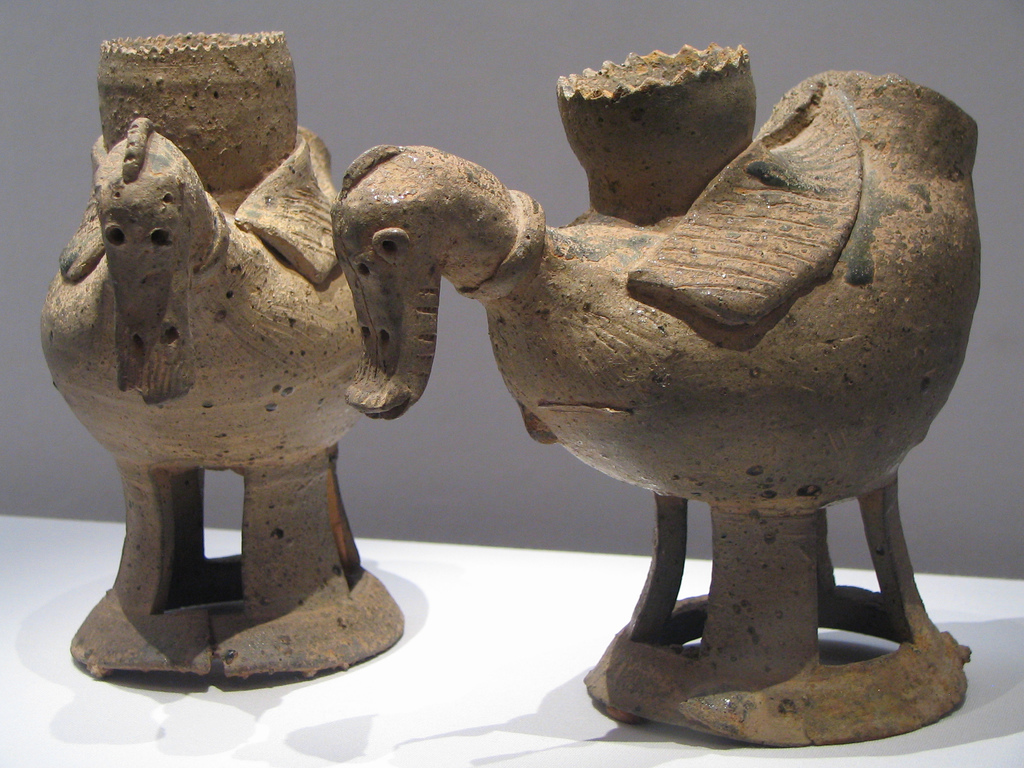
Gaya pottery

== See also ==
- History of Korea
- List of Korean monarchs
- Daegaya
- Suro of Geumgwan Gaya
- Gimhae Kim clan
- Song of Guji

== Bibliography ==
- Cheol, S.K. (2000). Relations between Kaya and Wa in the third to fourth centuries AD. Journal of East Asian Archeology 2(3–4), 112–122.
- Il, yeon. Garak-gukgi chronicles, Samgukyusa
