= Spearthrower Owl =

Teotihuacan symbol

Atlatl Cauac (Jatz'om Kuy, Spearthower Owl)
- Ajaw

King of Teotihuacan
- Reign: 2 May 374 – 9 June 439
- Successor: Nuun Yax Ayin? or Sihyaj Chan Kʼawiil II (grandson)?
- Born: Teotihuacan?
- Died: 9 June 439; Monte Albán
- Spouse: Lady Unen K'awiil of Tikal
- Issue: Yax Nuun Ahiin I, King of Tikal
- Religion: Maya religion

"Spearthrower Owl" (possibly Jatz'om Kuy, translating to "Striker Owl") was a Mesoamerican person from the Early Classic period, who is identified in Maya inscriptions and iconography. Mayanist David Stuart has suggested that Spearthrower Owl was a ruler of Teotihuacan at the start of the height of its influence across Mesoamerica in the 4th and 5th century, and that he was responsible for an intense period of Teotihuacan presence in the Maya area, including the conquest of Tikal in 378 CE.

== Name ==
Name glyph for Atlatl Cauac / Jatz'om Kuy / "Spearthrower Owl." Redrawn from carved stone.

"Spearthrower Owl" is a name invented by archaeologists to describe the Teotihuacan-originated atlatl-holding owl symbol, stylised as one or two Maya glyphs usually used to represent his name.

One version of the ruler's name glyph shows a weapon (an atlatl or other type) combined with an owl sign. At Tikal, the name appears written once with phonetic elements, suggesting the Mayan version of the name is Jatz'om Kuy, "striker owl," or "owl that will strike". The weapon-owl version is therefore probably the logographs for JATZ' together with KUY or KUJ.

Various logographs or glyphs depicting an owl and a spear-thrower are documented in Teotihuacan and in the Maya cities of Tikal, Uaxactun, Yaxchilan, and Toniná. They may or may not refer to the same individual, or have other symbolic meanings.

== Biography ==
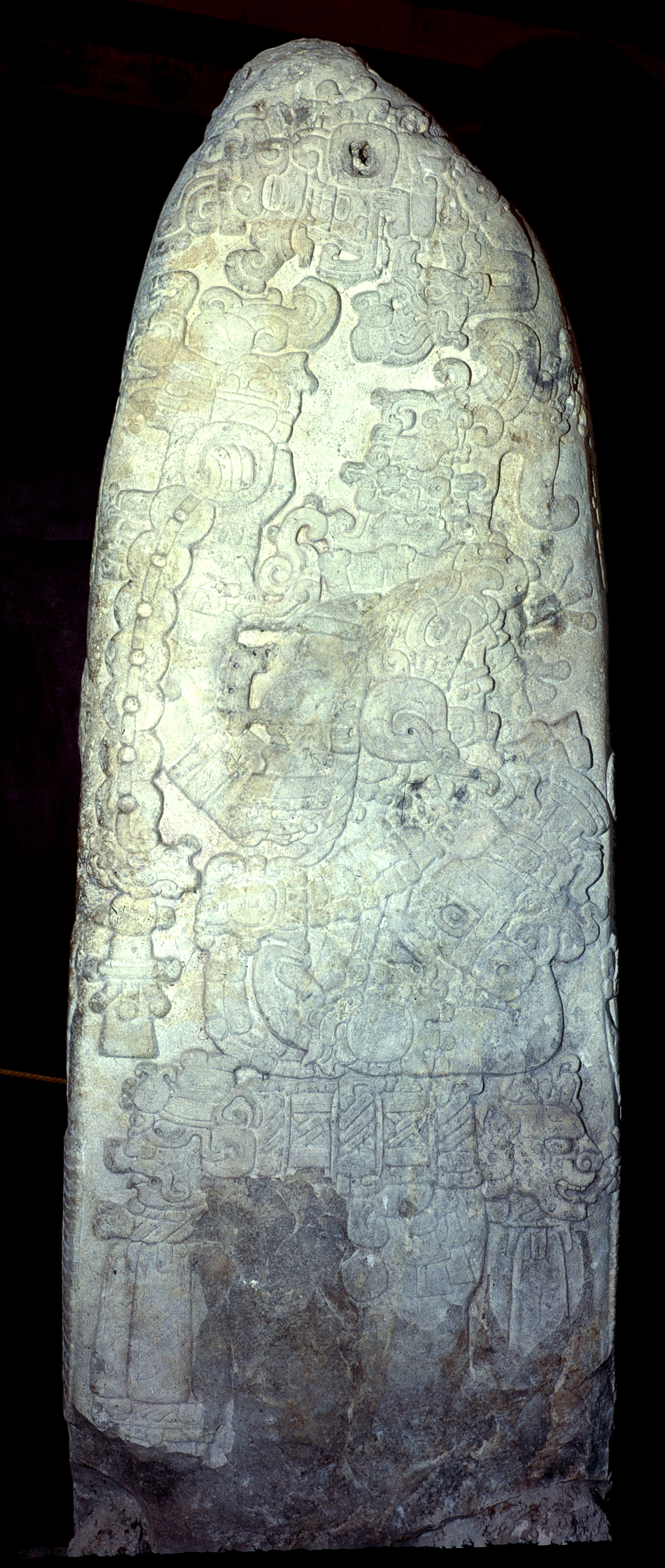
Tikal Stela 31, describing the ascension of Sihyaj Chan Kʼawiil II to the Tikal throne, and Spearthrower Owlʼs death 50 years later.

Maya inscriptions at several sites describe the arrival of strangers from the west, depicted with Teotihuacan-style garments and carrying weapons. These arrivals are connected to changes in political leadership at several of the sites.

Stuart noted that the Marcador monument at the Petén Basin center of Tikal records Spearthrower Owlʼs ascension to the throne of an unspecified polity on a date equivalent to 4 May 374 CE. Monuments at El Perú, Tikal and/or Uaxactun describe the arrival of a personage Siyaj Kʼakʼ somehow under the auspices of Spearthrower Owl in the month of January 378. The exact date of his arrival in Tikal is identical with the death of the Tikal ruler, Chak Tok Ichʼaak I. Tikal Stela 31 describes that in 379, a year after the arrival of Siyaj Kʼakʼ at Tikal, Yax Nuun Ahiin, described as a son of Spearthrower Owl and not of the previous ruler Chak Tok Ichʼaak, was installed as king of Tikal. His rule saw the introduction of Teotihuacan-style imagery in the iconography of Tikal. Stela 31 was erected during the reign of Yax Nuun Ahiinʼs son Sihyaj Chan Kʼawil and describes the death of that rulerʼs grandfather, Spearthrower Owl, in 439 CE (Maya date 9.0.3.9.18).

Spearthrower Owl was mentioned in later texts; for example, on a door lintel of Temple I where the Tikal ruler Jasaw Chan Kʼawiil I celebrated the thirteen kʼatun (13x20x360 days) anniversary (in 695 CE) of Spearthrower Owlʼs death when they "conjured the holy one."

== Interpretations ==
The connection of Spearthrower Owl to Teotihuacan as well as the precise nature of Teotihuacanʼs influence on the Maya has been a hotly debated topic since the hieroglyphic texts first became fully readable in the 1990s. The controversy is related to the general discussion of central Mexican influence in the Maya area which was sparked by the findings of Teotihuacan-related objects in the early Maya site of Kaminaljuyú in the 1930s.

The controversy has two sides. The "internalist" side argues for limited direct contact between Teotihuacan and the Maya area. This side has been represented by epigraphers such as Linda Schele and David Freidel who have argued that the Maya merely had friendly diplomatic relations with Teotihuacan which caused the Maya elite to emulate Teotihuacano culture and ideology. The "externalist" side argues that Teotihuacan was an important factor in the development of Maya culture and politics in the Classic period. This viewpoint was first associated with archaeologist William Sanders who argued for an extreme externalist viewpoint. But as more evidence of direct Teotihuacan influence in the Maya area surged at Copán and new hieroglyphic decipherments by epigraphers such as David Stuart interpreted Teotihuacan incursion as a military invasion, the externalist position was strengthened. In 2003, George Cowgill, an archaeologist specialising in Teotihuacan who had formerly espoused a mostly internalist perspective on Teotihuacan–Maya relations, summarised the debate, conceding that Teotihuacan had probably exercised some kind of political control in the Maya area in the early classic period and that left an important legacy into the late and epi-classic periods.

In 2008 an interpretation of Spearthrower Owl-related iconography at Teotihuacan suggested that Spearthrower Owl was an important military god at Teotihuacan that had his given name to both a place known as "Spearthrower Owl Hill" and to the ruler mentioned in the Maya hieroglyphic texts.
