= Ayodhya =

City in Uttar Pradesh, India

- City
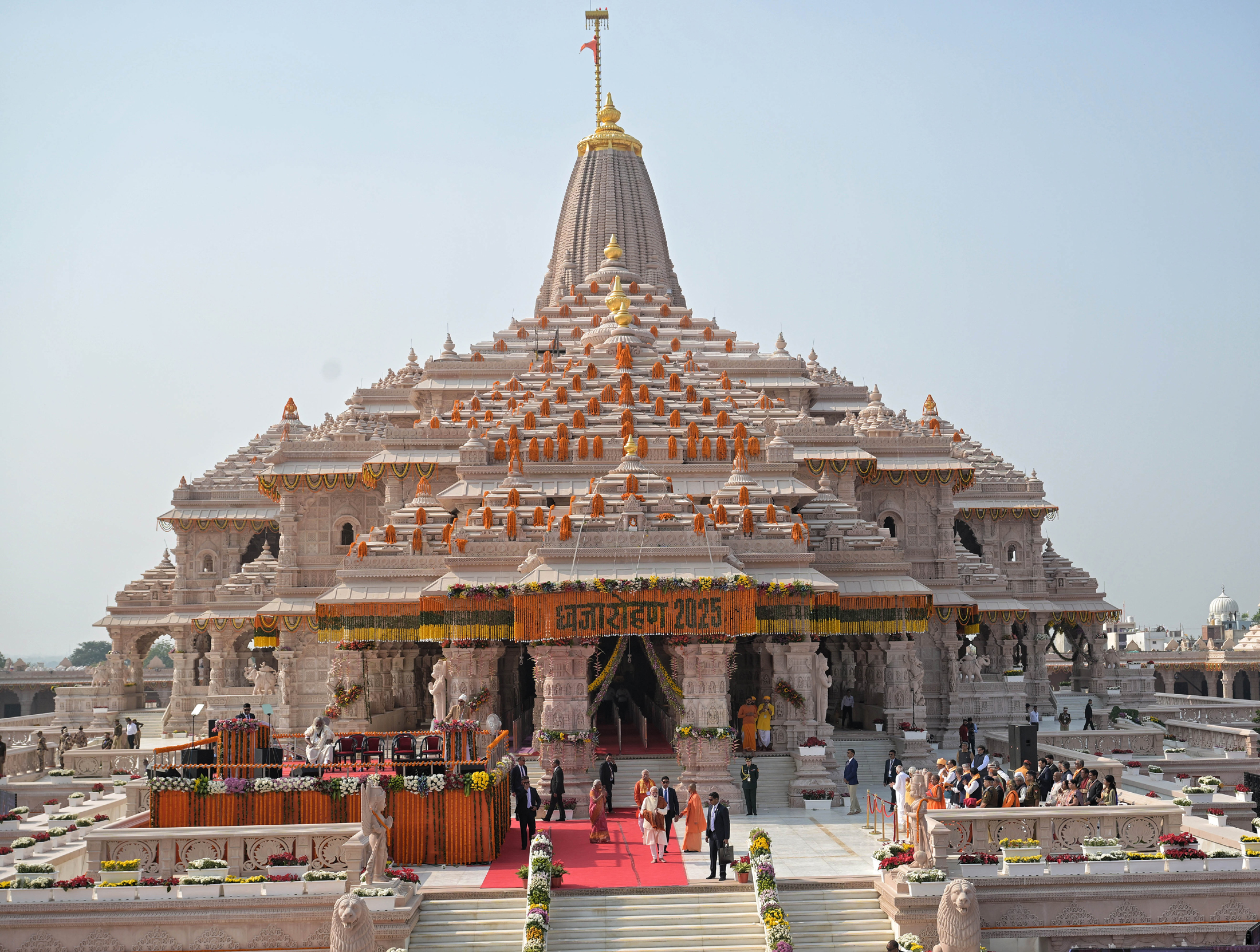
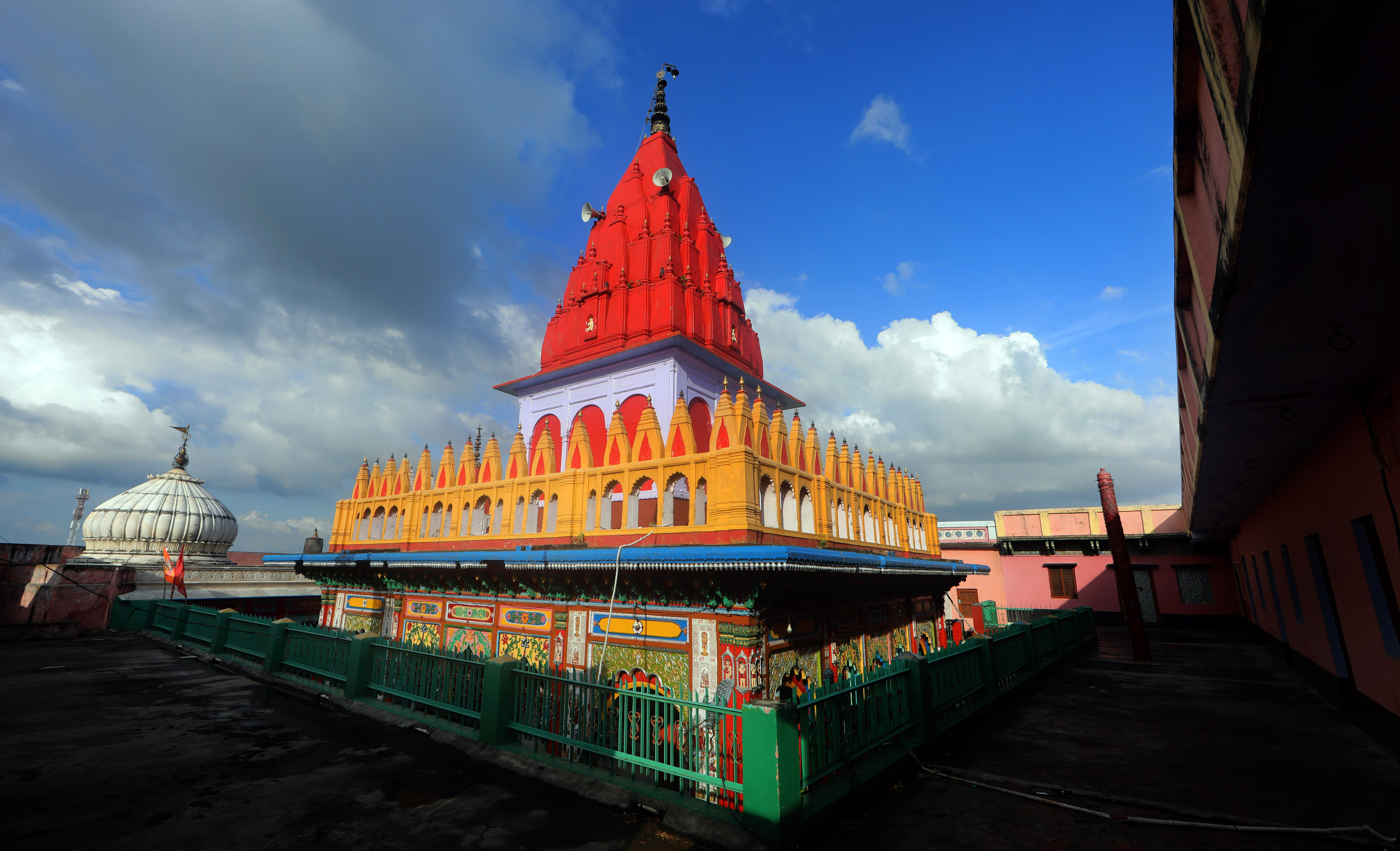
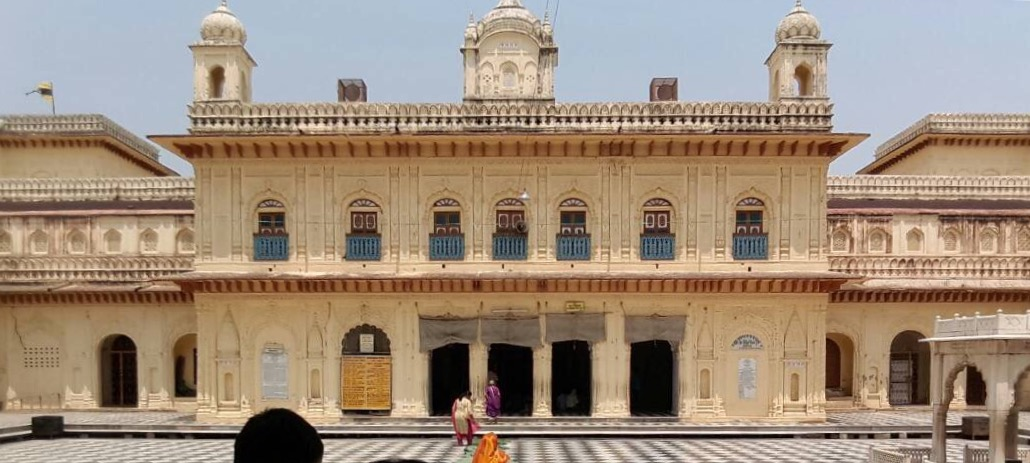
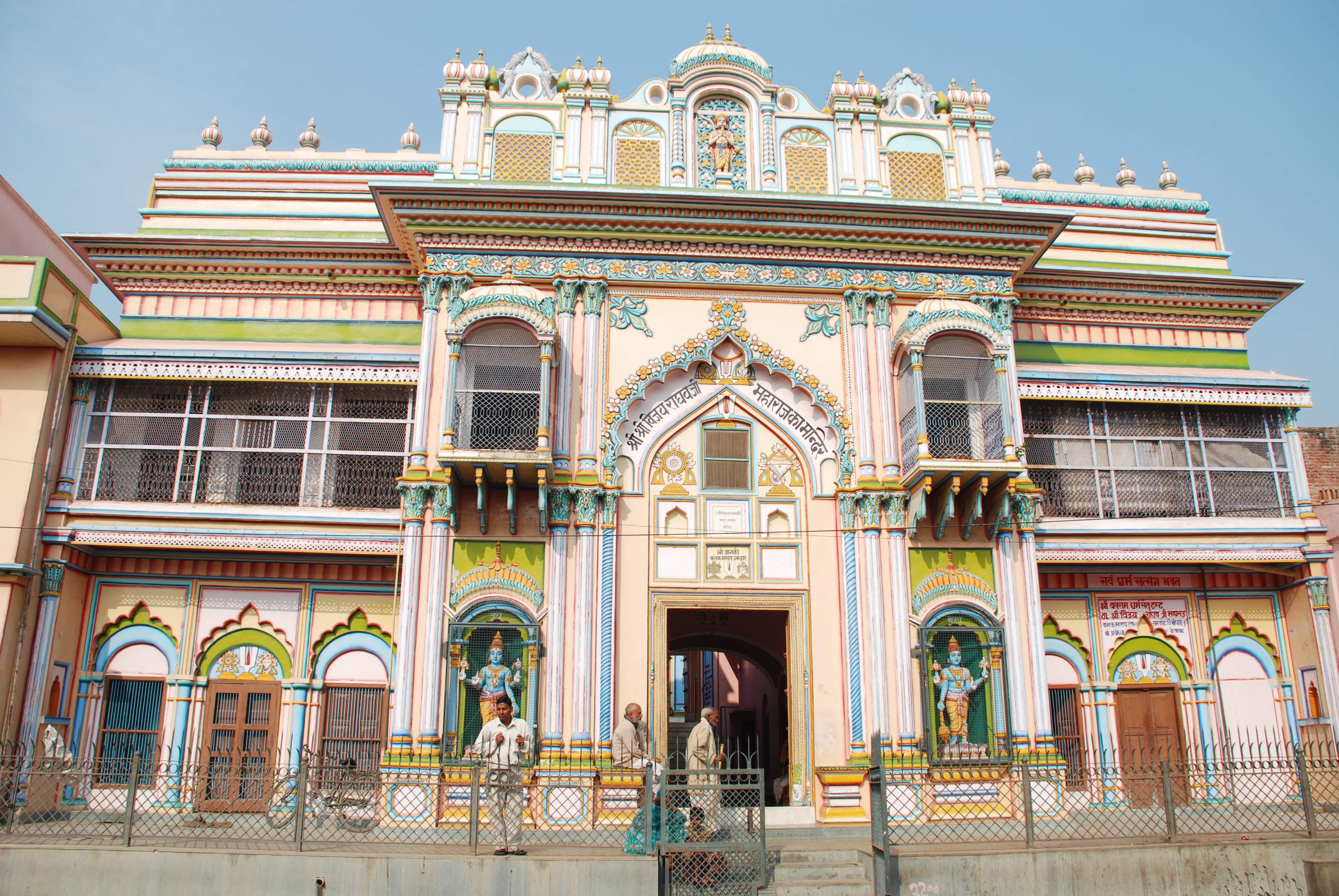
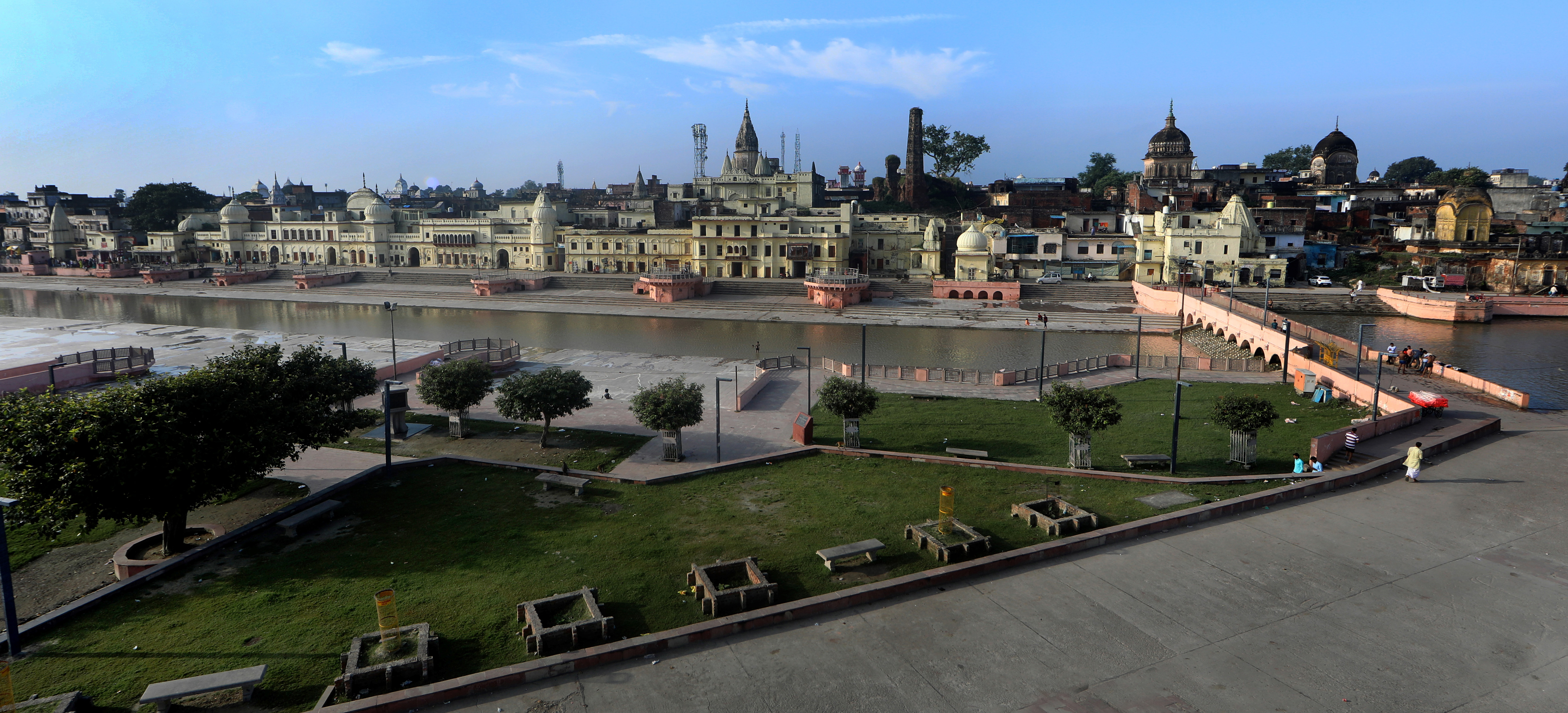
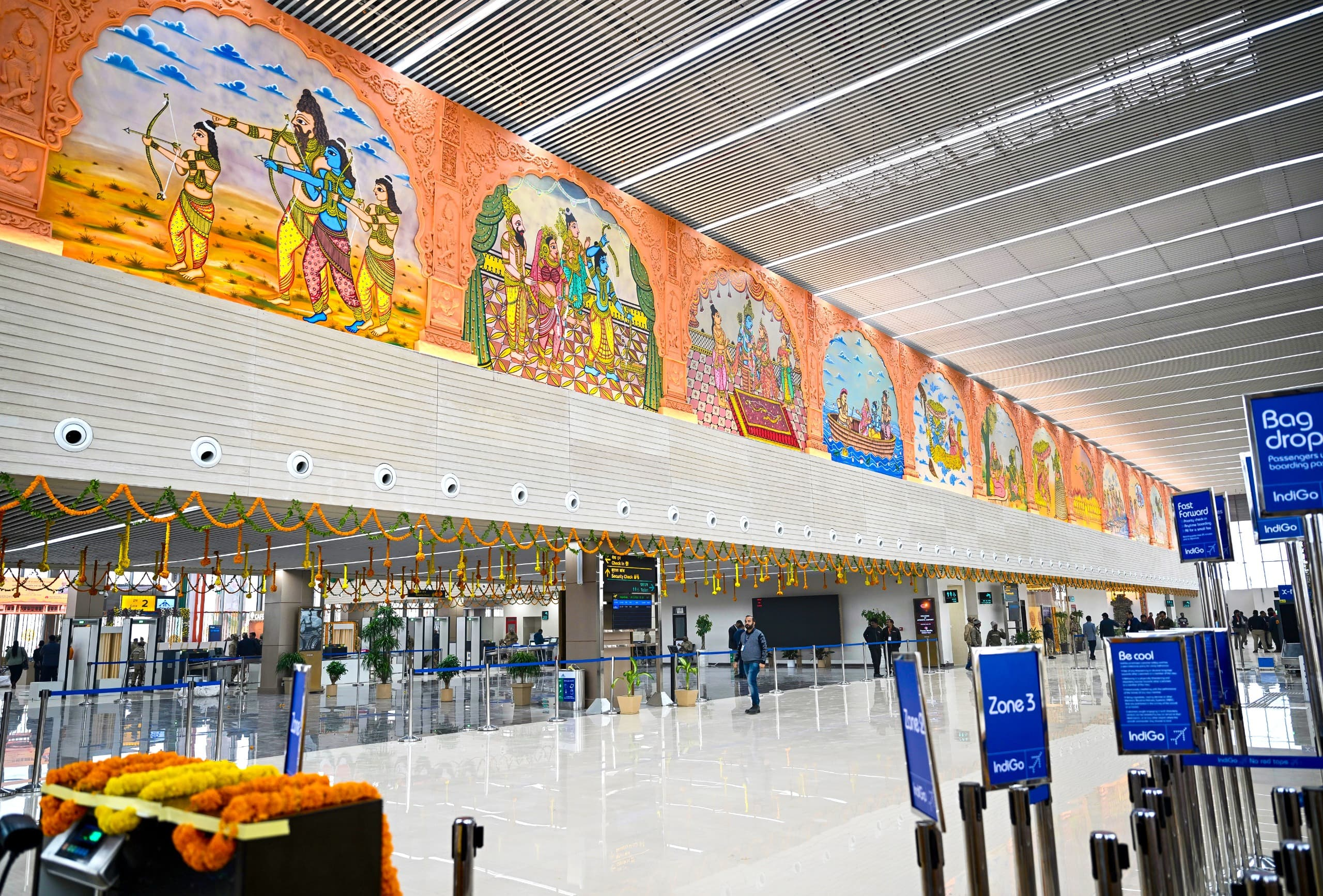
- Ram Mandir Ram ki Paidi Ghat on Saryu River Hanuman Garhi Temple Kanak Bhawan Temple Vijayraghav Mandir Guptar Ghat on Saryu River Ayodhya Airport
- Nicknames: Ram Nagri, The Temple Town
- location in India and Uttar Pradesh Ayodhya (India)
- Coordinates: 26°47′57″N 82°12′16″E
- Country: India
- State: Uttar Pradesh
- Division: Ayodhya
- District: Ayodhya

Government
  - Type: Municipal Corporation
  - Body: Ayodhya Municipal Corporation
  - Mayor: Girish Pati Tripathi (BJP)
  - Lok Sabha MP: Awadhesh Prasad (SP)
  - MLA: Ved Prakash Gupta (BJP)

Area
  - Total: 120.8 km^{2} (46.6 sq mi)
- Elevation: 93 m (305 ft)

Population (2011)
  - Total: 55,890
  - Density: 462.7/km^{2} (1,198/sq mi)
- Demonym(s): Ayodhyawasi, Awadhwasi

Language
  - Official: Hindi
  - Additional official: Urdu
  - Regional: Awadhi
- Time zone: UTC+05:30 (IST)
- PIN(s): 224001, 224123, 224133, 224135
- Area code: +91-5278
- Vehicle registration: UP-42
- Website: ayodhya.nic.in

Ayodhya (Hindi: Ayodhyā, pronounced [ɐˈjoːd̪ʱjɐː]) is a city situated on the banks of the Saryu river in the Indian state of Uttar Pradesh. It is the administrative headquarters of the Ayodhya district as well as the Ayodhya division of Uttar Pradesh, India. Ayodhya became the top tourist destination of Uttar Pradesh with 110 million visitors in the first half of 2024, surpassing Varanasi.

The settlement was historically known as Sāketa until it was renamed to Ayodhya during the Gupta period. The early Buddhist and Jain canonical texts mention that the religious leaders Gautama Buddha and Mahavira visited and lived in the city. The Jain texts also describe it as the birthplace of five tirthankaras namely, Rishabhanatha, Ajitanatha, Abhinandananatha, Sumatinatha and Anantanatha, and associate it with the legendary Bharata Chakravarti. From the Gupta period onwards, several sources mention Ayodhya and Saketa as the name of the same city.

The legendary city of Ayodhya, popularly identified as the present-day Ayodhya, is identified in the epic Ramayana and its many versions as the birthplace of the Hindu deity Rama of Kosala and is hence regarded as the first of the seven most important pilgrimage sites for Hindus. A 2nd-century CE stone slab inscription recovered from nearby Kaushambi contains a Brahmi dedicatory epigraph invoking the worship of Bhagavat Rama-Narayana, providing early epigraphic evidence of the deification of Rama within the regional Vaishnavism tradition during the Kushan period. Hans T. Bakker also notes that the earliest attestation to a place called Ayodhya is from the 2nd century CE.

The Ayodhya dispute was centred on the Babri mosque, built 1528–29 under the Mughal emperor Babur and said to have been built on top of a Hindu temple that stood at the birth spot of Rama. In 1992 a Hindu mob demolished the mosque, provoking riots throughout the country. In 2019, the Supreme Court of India announced the final verdict that the land belonged to the government based on tax records; It further ordered the land to be handed over to a trust to build the Ram Mandir; which was consecrated in January 2024. It also ordered the government to give an alternate five acre tract of land to the Uttar Pradesh Sunni Central Waqf Board to build the mosque.

== Etymology ==
The word "Ayodhya" is a regularly formed derivation of the Sanskrit verb yudh, "to fight, or wage war". Yodhya is the future passive participle, meaning "to be fought"; the initial a is the negative prefix; the whole, therefore, means "not to be fought" or, more idiomatically in English, "invincible". This meaning is attested by the Atharvaveda, which uses it to refer to the unconquerable city of gods. The ninth century Jain poem Adi Purana also states that Ayodhya "does not exist by name alone but by the merit" of being unconquerable by enemies. Satyopakhyana interprets the word differently, stating that it means "that which cannot be conquered by sins" (instead of enemies).

"Saketa" is the older name for the city, attested in Sanskrit, Jain, Buddhist, Greek and Chinese sources. According to Vaman Shivram Apte, the word "Saketa" is derived from the Sanskrit words Saha (with) and Aketen (houses or buildings). The Adi Purana states that Ayodhya is called Saketa "because of its magnificent buildings which had significant banners as their arms". According to Hans T. Bakker, the word may be derived from the roots sa and ketu ("with banner"); the variant name saketu is attested in the Vishnu Purana.

Ayodhya was stated to be the capital of the ancient Kosala kingdom in the Ramayana. Hence it was also referred to as "Kosala". The Adi Purana states that Ayodhya is famous as su-kośala "because of its prosperity and good skill".

The cities of Ayutthaya (Thailand), and Yogyakarta (Indonesia), are named after Ayodhya.

== History ==
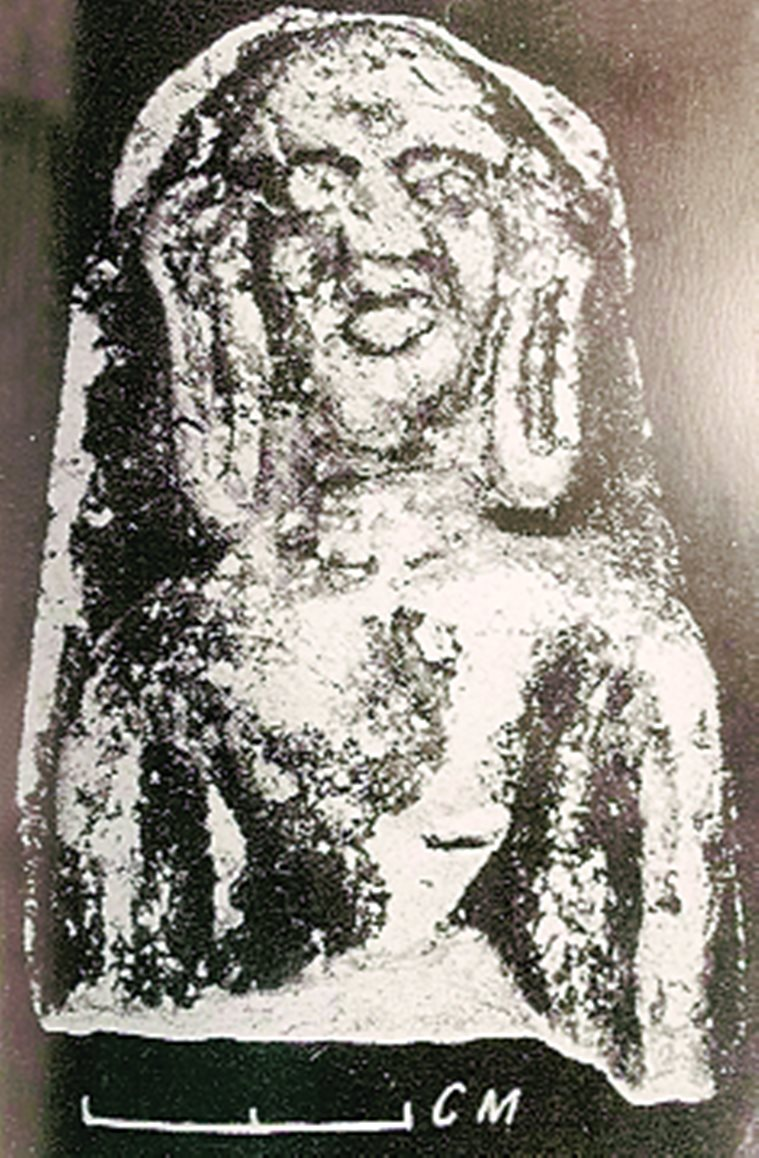
Terracotta image of a Jain tirthankara dated fourth century BCE excavated from Ayodhya

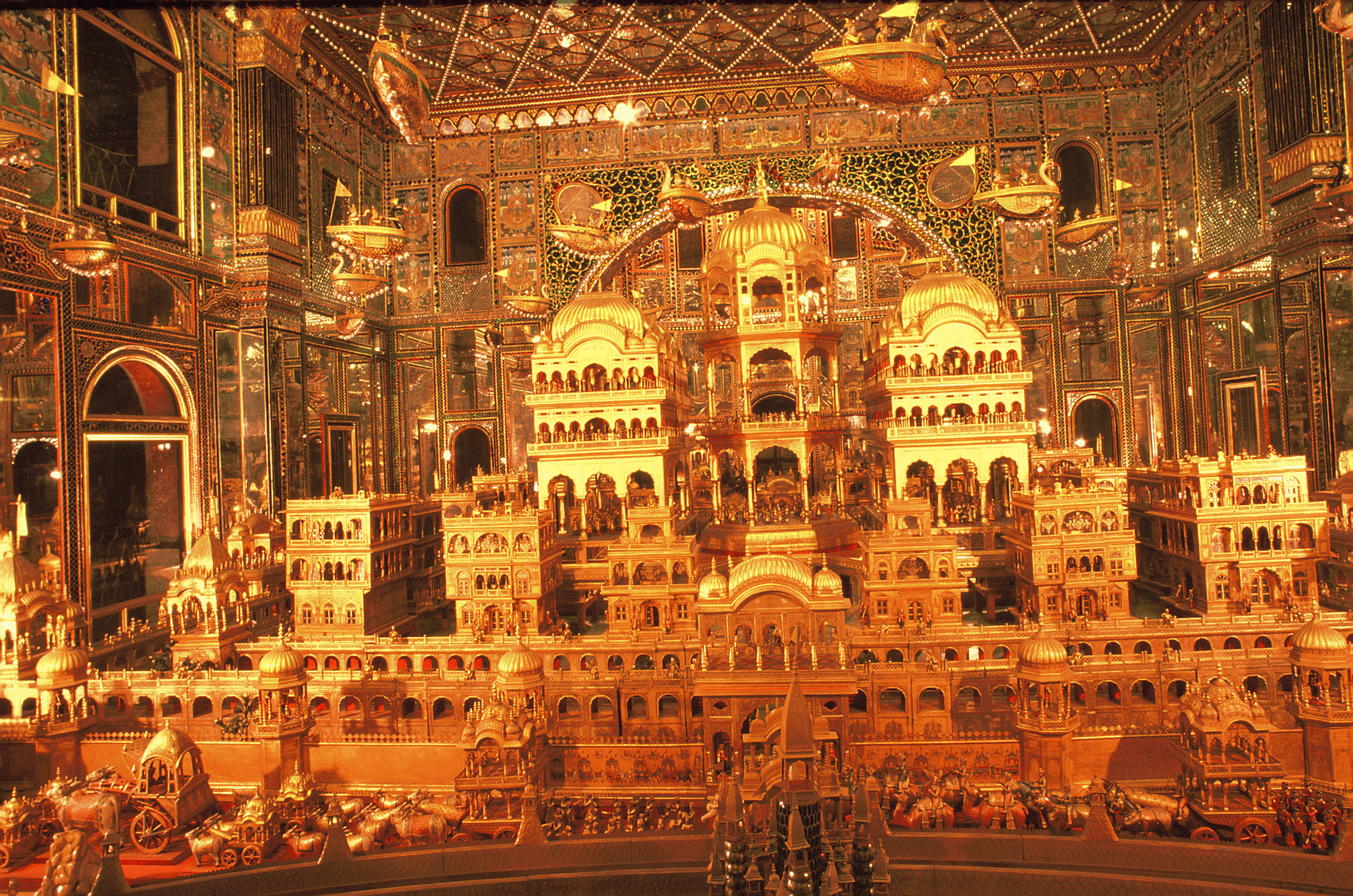
Gold carving depiction of the legendary Ayodhya at the Ajmer Jain temple

Ancient Indian Sanskrit-language epics, such as the Ramayana and the Mahabharata mention a legendary city called Ayodhya, which was the capital of the legendary Ikshvaku kings of Kosala, including Rama. Neither these texts, nor the earlier Sanskrit texts such as the Vedas, mention a city called Saketa. Non-religious, non-legendary ancient Sanskrit texts, such as Panini's Ashtadhyayi and Patanjali's commentary on it, do mention Saketa. The later Buddhist text Mahavastu describes Saketa as the seat of the Ikshvaku king Sujata, whose descendants established the Shakya capital Kapilavastu.

The earliest of the Buddhist Pali-language texts and the Jain Prakrit-language texts mention a city called Saketa (Sageya or Saeya in Prakrit) as an important city of the Kosala mahajanapada. Topographical indications in both Buddhist and Jain texts suggest that Saketa is the same as the present-day Ayodhya. For example, according to the Samyutta Nikaya and the Vinaya Pitaka, Saketa was located at a distance of six yojanas from Shravasti. The Vinaya Pitaka mentions that a big river was located between the two cities, and the Sutta Nipata mentions Saketa as the first halting place on the southward road from Shravasti to Pratishthana.

Fourth century onwards, multiple texts, including Kalidasa's Raghuvamsha, mention Ayodhya as another name for Saketa. The later Jain canonical text Jambudvipa-Pannati describes a city called Viniya (or Vinita) as the birthplace of Rishabhanatha, and associates this city with Bharata Chakravartin; the Kalpa-Sutra describes Ikkhagabhumi as the birthplace of Rishabhanatha. The index on the Jain text Paumachariya clarifies that Aojjha (Aodhya), Kosala-puri ("Kosala city"), Viniya, and Saeya (Saketa) are synonyms. The post-Canonical Jain texts also mention "Aojjha"; for example, the Avassagacurni describes it as the principal city of Kosala, while the Avassaganijjutti names it as the capital of Sagara Chakravartin. The Avassaganijjutti implies that Viniya ("Vinia"), Kosalapuri ("Kosalapura"), and Ikkhagabhumi were distinct cities, naming them as the capitals of Abhinamdana, Sumai, and Usabha respectively. Abhayadeva's commentary on the Thana Sutta, another post-canonical text, identifies Saketa, Ayodhya, and Vinita as one city.

According to one theory, the legendary Ayodhya city is the same as the historical city of Saketa and the present-day Ayodhya. According to another theory, the legendary Ayodhya is a mythical city, and the name "Ayodhya" came to be used for the Saketa (present-day Ayodhya) only around the fourth century, when a Gupta emperor (probably Skandagupta) moved his capital to Saketa, and renamed it to Ayodhya after the legendary city. Alternative, but less likely, theories state that Saketa and Ayodhya were two adjoining cities, or that Ayodhya was a locality within the Saketa city.

=== As Saketa ===
Archaeological and literary evidence suggests that the site of present-day Ayodhya had developed into an urban settlement by the fifth or sixth-century BC. The site is identified as the location of the ancient Sāketa city, which probably emerged as a marketplace located at the junction of the two important roads, the Shravasti-Pratishthana north–south road, and the Rajagriha-Varanasi-Shravasti-Taxila east–west road. Ancient Buddhist texts, such as Samyutta Nikaya, state that Saketa was located in the Kosala kingdom ruled by Prasenajit (or Pasenadi; c. sixth–5th century BC), whose capital was located at Shravasti. The later Buddhist commentary Dhammapada-atthakatha states that the Saketa town was established by merchant Dhananjaya (the father of Visakha), on the suggestion of king Prasenajit. The Digha Nikaya describes it as one of the six large cities of India. The early Buddhist canonical texts mention Shravasti as the capital of Kosala, but the later texts, such as the Jain texts Nayadhammakahao and Pannavana Suttam, and the Buddhist Jatakas, mention Saketa as the capital of Kosala.

As a busy town frequented by travellers, it appears to have become important for preachers such as Gautama Buddha and Mahavira. The Samyutta Nikaya and Anguttara Nikaya mention that Buddha resided at Saketa at times. The early Jain canonical texts (such as Antagada-dasao, Anuttarovavaiya-dasao, and Vivagasuya) state that Mahavira visited Saketa; Nayadhammakahao states that Parshvanatha also visited Saketa. The Jain texts, both canonical and post-canonical, describe Ayodhya as the location of various shrines, such as those of snake, the yaksha Pasamiya, Suvratasvamin, and Surappia.

It is not clear what happened to Saketa after Kosala was conquered by the Magadha emperor Ajatashatru around fifth century BC. There is lack of historical sources about the city's situation for the next few centuries: it is possible that the city remained a commercial centre of secondary importance, but did not grow into a political centre of Magadha, whose capital was located at Pataliputra. Several Buddhist buildings may have been constructed in the town during the rule of the Maurya emperor Ashoka in the third century BC: these buildings were probably located on the present-day human-made mounds in Ayodhya. Excavations at Ayodhya have resulted in the discovery of a large brick wall, identified as a fortification wall by archaeologist B. B. Lal. This wall probably erected in the last quarter of the third-century BC.

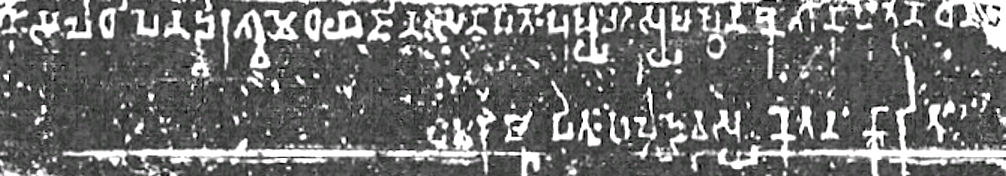
The Dhanadeva-Ayodhya inscription, first-century BC

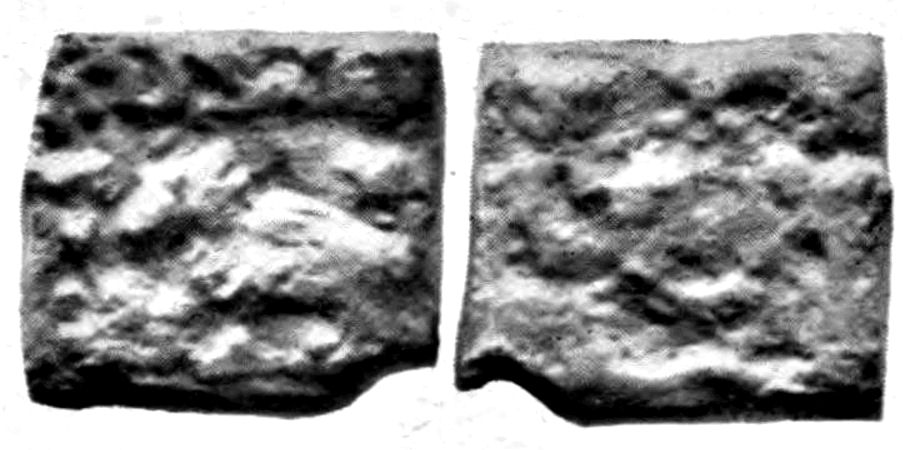
Coin of ruler Muladeva, of the Deva dynasty minted in Ayodhya, Kosala. Obv: Muladevasa, elephant to left facing symbol. Rev: Wreath, above symbol, below snake.

After the decline of the Maurya empire, Saketa appears to have come under the rule of Pushyamitra Shunga. The first century BC inscription of Dhanadeva suggests that he appointed a governor there. The Yuga Purana mentions Saketa as the residence of a governor, and describes it as being attacked by a combined force of Greeks, Mathuras, and Panchalas. Patanjali's commentary on Panini also refers to the Greek siege of Saketa.

Later, Saketa appears to have become part of a small, independent kingdom. The Yuga Purana states that Saketa was ruled by seven powerful kings after the retreat of the Greeks. The Vayu Purana and the Brahmanda Purana also state that seven powerful kings ruled in the capital of Kosala. The historicity of these kings is attested by the discovery of the coins of the Deva dynasty kings, including Dhanadeva, whose inscription describes him as the king of Kosala (Kosaladhipati). As the capital of Kosala, Saketa probably eclipsed Shravasti in importance during this period. The east–west route connecting Pataliputra to Taxila, which earlier passed through Saketa and Shravasti, appears to have shifted southwards during this period, now passing through Saketa, Ahichhatra and Kanyakubja.

After the Deva kings, Saketa appears to have been ruled by the Datta, Kushan, and Mitra kings, although the chronological order of their rule is uncertain. Bakker theorises that the Dattas succeeded the Deva kings in the mid-1st century AD, and their kingdom was annexed to the Kushan Empire by Kanishka. The Tibetan text Annals of Li Country (c. 11th century) mentions that an alliance of king Vijayakirti of Khotan, king Kanika, the king of Gu-zan, and the king of Li, marched to India and captured the So-ked city. During this invasion, Vijayakirti took several Buddhist relics from Saketa, and placed them in the stupa of Phru-no. If Kanika is identified as Kanishka, and So-ked as Saketa, it appears that the invasion of Kushans and their allies led to the destruction of the Buddhist sites at Saketa.

Nevertheless, Saketa appears to have remained a prosperous town during the Kushan rule. The second century geographer Ptolemy mentions a metropolis "Sageda" or "Sagoda", which has been identified with Saketa. The earliest inscription that mentions Saketa as a place name is dated to the late Kushan period: it was found on the pedestal of a Buddha image in Shravasti, and records the gift of the image by Sihadeva of Saketa. Before or after the Kushans, Saketa appears to have been ruled by a dynasty of kings whose names end in "-mitra", and whose coins have been found at Ayodhya. They may have been members of a local dynasty that was distinct from the Mitra dynasty of Mathura. These kings are attested only by their coinage: Sangha-mitra, Vijaya-mitra, Satya-mitra, Deva-mitra, and Arya-mitra; coins of Kumuda-sena and Aja-varman have also been discovered.

=== Gupta period ===
Around the fourth century, the region came under the control of the Guptas, who revived Brahmanism. The Vayu Purana and the Brahmanda Purana attest that the early Gupta kings ruled Saketa. No Gupta-era archaeological layers have been discovered in present-day Ayodhya, although a large number of Gupta coins have been discovered here. It is possible that during the Gupta period, the habitations in the city were located in the areas that have not yet been excavated. The Buddhist sites that had suffered destruction during the Khotanese-Kushan invasion appear to have remained deserted. The fifth-century Chinese traveller Faxian states that the ruins of Buddhist buildings existed at "Sha-chi" during his time. One theory identifies Sha-chi with Saketa, although this identification is not undisputed. If Sha-chi is indeed Saketa, it appears that by the fifth century, the town no longer had a flourishing Buddhist community or any important Buddhist building that was still in use.

An important development during the Gupta period was the recognition of Saketa as the legendary city of Ayodhya, the capital of the Ikshvaku dynasty. The 436 AD Karamdanda (Karmdand) inscription, issued during the reign of Kumaragupta I, names Ayodhya as the capital of the Kosala province, and records commander Prithvisena's offerings to Brahmins from Ayodhya. Later, the capital of the Gupta Empire was moved from Pataliputra to Ayodhya. Paramartha states that king Vikramaditya moved the royal court to Ayodhya; Xuanzang also corroborates this, stating that this king moved the court to the "country of Shravasti", that is, Kosala. A local oral tradition of Ayodhya, first recorded in writing by Robert Montgomery Martin in 1838, mentions that the city was deserted after the death of Rama's descendant Brihadbala. The city remain deserted until King Vikrama of Ujjain came searching for it, and re-established it. He cut down the forests that had covered the ancient ruins, erected the Ramgar fort, and built 360 temples.

Vikramditya was a title of multiple Gupta kings, and the king who moved the capital to Ayodhya is identified as Skandagupta. Bakker theorises that the move to Ayodhya may have been prompted by a flooding of the river Ganges at Pataliputra, the need to check the Huna advance from the west, and Skandagupta's desire to compare himself with Rama (whose Ikshvaku dynasty is associated with the legendary Ayodhya). According to Paramaratha's Life of Vasubandhu, Vikramaditya was a patron of scholars, and awarded 300,000 pieces of gold to Vasubandhu. The text states that Vasubandhu was a native of Saketa ("Sha-ki-ta"), and describes Vikramaditya as the king of Ayodhya ("A-yu-ja"). This wealth was used to build three monasteries in the country of A-yu-ja (Ayodhya). Paramartha further states that the later king Baladitya (identified with Narasimhagupta) and his mother also awarded large sums of gold to Vasubandhu, and these funds were used to build another Buddhist temple at Ayodhya. These structures may have been seen by the seventh century Chinese traveller Xuanzang, who describes a stupa and a monastery at Ayodhya ("O-yu-t-o"). He found over a hundred Buddhist Viharas and only 10 Hindu temples in Ayodhya.

=== Decline as a political centre ===
Ayodhya probably suffered when the Hunas led by Mihirakula invaded the Gupta empire in the sixth century. After the fall of the Guptas, it may have been ruled by the Maukhari dynasty, whose coins have been found in the nearby areas. It was not devastated, as Xuanzang describes it as a flourishing town and a Buddhist centre. However, it had lost its position as an important political centre to Kanyakubja (Kannauj). At the time of Xuanzang's visit, it was a part of Harsha's empire, and was probably the seat of a vassal or an administrative officer. Xuanzang states that the city measured about 0.6 km (20 li) in circumference. Another seventh-century source, Kāśikāvṛttī, mentions that the town was surrounded by a moat similar to that around Pataliputra.

After the fall of Harsha's empire, Ayodhya appears to have been variously controlled by local kings and the rulers of Kannauj, including Yashovarman and the Gurjara-Pratiharas. The town is not mentioned in any surviving texts or inscriptions composed during 650–1050 AD, although it may be identified with the "city of Harishchandra" mentioned in the eighth-century poem Gaudavaho. Archaeological evidence (including images to Vishnu, Jain tirthankaras, Ganesha, the seven Matrikas, and a Buddhist stupa) suggests that the religious activity in the area continued during this period.

=== Early medieval period ===
According to Indologist Hans T. Bakker, the only religious significance of Ayodhya in the first millennium AD was related to the Gopratara tirtha (now called Guptar Ghat), where Rama and his followers are said to have ascended to heaven by entering the waters of Sarayu.

In the 11th century, the Gahadavala dynasty came to power in the region, and promoted Vaishnavism. They built several Vishnu temples in Ayodhya, five of which survived till the end of Aurangzeb's reign. Hans Bakker concludes that there might have been a temple at the supposed birth spot of Rama built by the Gahadavalas (see Vishnu Hari inscription). In subsequent years, the cult of Rama developed within Vaishnavism, with Rama being regarded as among the foremost avatars of Vishnu. Between the 13th and 18th century, Ayodhya's importance as a pilgrimage centre grew.

In 1226 AD, Ayodhya became the capital of the province of Awadh (or "Oudh") within the Delhi sultanate. Muslim historians state that the area was little more than wilderness prior to this. Pilgrimage was tolerated, but the tax on pilgrims ensured that the temples did not receive much income.

=== Mughal period ===
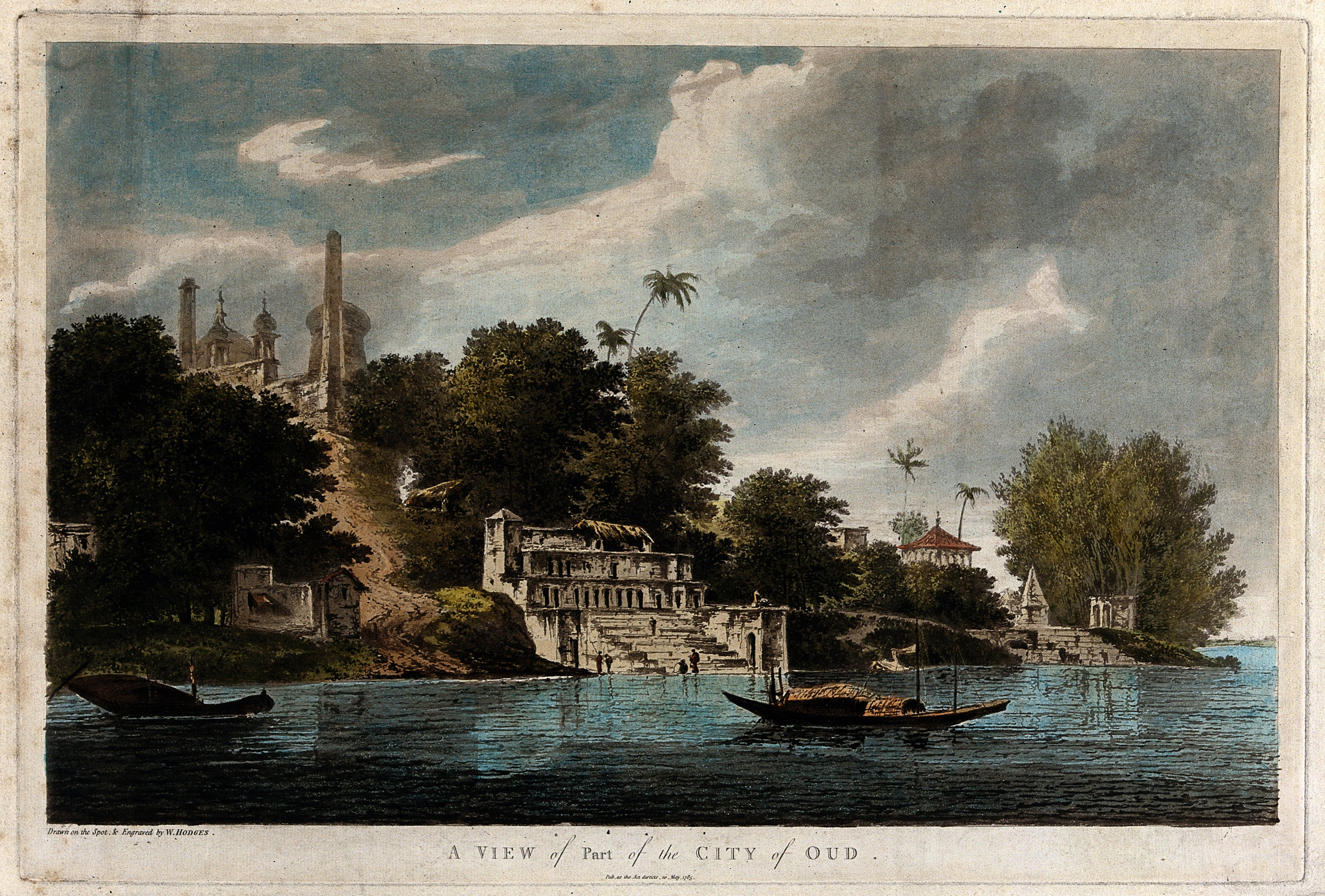
Ayodhya in 1785 as seen from river Ghaghara; painting by William Hodges. It depicts the Svargadvar Ghat. A mosque of Aurangzeb period in the background.

Under Mughal rule, the Babri mosque was constructed in Ayodhya. The city was the capital of the province of Awadh (pronounced as "Oudh" by the British), which is also believed to be a variant of the name "Ayodhya".

After the death of Aurangzeb in 1707 AD, the central Muslim rule weakened, and Awadh became virtually independent, with Ayodhya as its capital. However, the rulers became increasingly dependent on the local Hindu nobles, and control over the temples and pilgrimage centres was relaxed.

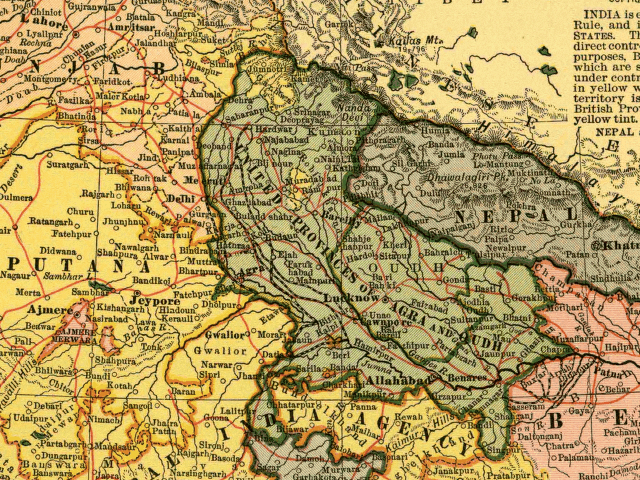
United Provinces of Agra and Oudh, showing 'Ajodhia', 1903 map

=== British period ===
In the 1850s, a group of Hindus attacked the Babri mosque, on the grounds that it was built over the birthplace of the Hindu deity Rama. To prevent further disputes, British colonial authorities divided the mosque premises between Hindus and Muslims. Ayodhya was annexed in 1856 by the British East India Company (EIC). The rulers of Awadh were Shia, and the Sunni groups had already protested against the permissive attitude of the former government. The EIC intervened and managed to suppress the Sunni agitation. In 1857, the British annexed Oudh (Awadh) and subsequently reorganised it into the United Provinces of Agra and Oudh.

=== Independent India ===
A movement was launched in 1984 by the Vishva Hindu Parishad party to reclaim the Babri mosque site for a Rama temple. In 1992, a right wing Hindu nationalist rally turned into a riot, leading to the demolition of the Babri mosque. A makeshift temple at Ram Janmabhoomi for Ram Lalla, infant Rama was constructed. Under the Indian government orders, no one was permitted near the site within 200 yards, and the gate was locked to the outside. Hindu pilgrims, however, began entering through a side door to offer worship.

In 2003, the Archaeological Survey of India (ASI) carried out an excavation at the mosque site to determine if it was built over the ruins of a temple. The excavation uncovered pillar bases indicating a temple had been in existence under the mosque. Besides Hindus, the Buddhist and Jain representatives claimed that their temples existed at the excavated site.

On 5 July 2005, five terrorists attacked the site of the makeshift Ramlalla temple in Ayodhya. All five were killed in the ensuing gunfight with security forces, and one civilian died in the bomb blast triggered as they attempted to breach the cordon wall.

On 30 September 2010, the Lucknow bench of the Allahabad High Court ruled that one-third of the disputed land should be given to the Uttar Pradesh Sunni Central Waqf Board, one-third to the Nirmohi Akhara and one-third to the Hindu party for the shrine of "Ram Lalla" (infant Rama). The court further ruled that the area where the idols of Ram are present be given to Hindus in the final decree, while the rest of the land shall be divided equally by metes and bounds among the three parties. The judgement, along with evidences provided by the Archaeological Survey of India, upheld that the Babri Masjid was built after demolishing the Hindu temple, which is the birthplace of Rama, and that the mosque was not constructed according to the principles of Islam. The final verdict by the Supreme Court on the case ruled the disputed land in the favour of Hindus for the construction of Ram Mandir and ordered an alternative piece of land be given to the Muslim community for the construction of a mosque.

In a judgement pronounced by a 5 judge bench of the Supreme Court of India on 9 November 2019, the land was handed over to the government to form a trust for the construction of a temple. The court instructed the government to also allot a plot of 2.0 hectares (5 acres) in Ayodhya to the Uttar Pradesh Sunni Central Waqf Board to construct a mosque/Masjid.

Some South Koreans have identified the "Ayuta" mentioned in their ancient Samgungnyusa legend with Ayodhya. According to this legend, the ancient Korean princess Heo Hwang-ok came from Ayuta. In the 2000s, the local government of Ayodhya and South Korea acknowledged the connection and held a ceremony to raise a statue of the princess.

==== Ram temple ====
On 5 August 2020, the prime minister of India, Narendra Modi, laid the ceremonial foundation stone for a new temple at what is believed to be the birthplace of the god, Ram. It was planned to build a new township, Navya Ayodhya, on a 200-hectare (500-acre) site next to the Faizabad-Gorakhpur highway, which will have luxury hotels and apartment complexes.

The Ram Mandir (lit. 'Rama Temple') is a Hindu temple complex in Ayodhya, Uttar Pradesh, India. Many Hindus believe that it is located at the site of Ram Janmabhoomi, considered as the birthplace of Rama, a principal deity of Hinduism. The temple was inaugurated on 22 January 2024 after a prana pratishtha (consecration) ceremony.

== Demographics ==
1. Hinduism (93.2%)
2. Islam (6.19%)
3. Jainism (0.16%)
4. Sikhism (0.14%)
5. Buddhism (0.12%)
6. Others^ (0.16%)
^ includes Christians and other religion

As of the 2011 Census of India, Ayodhya had a population of 55,890. Males constituted 56.7% of the population and females 43.3%. Ayodhya had an average literacy rate of 78.1%. As per the religion data of 2011 Census, the majority population is of Hindu religion with 93.23%, and Muslims comes the second with 6.19%.

== Geography and climate ==
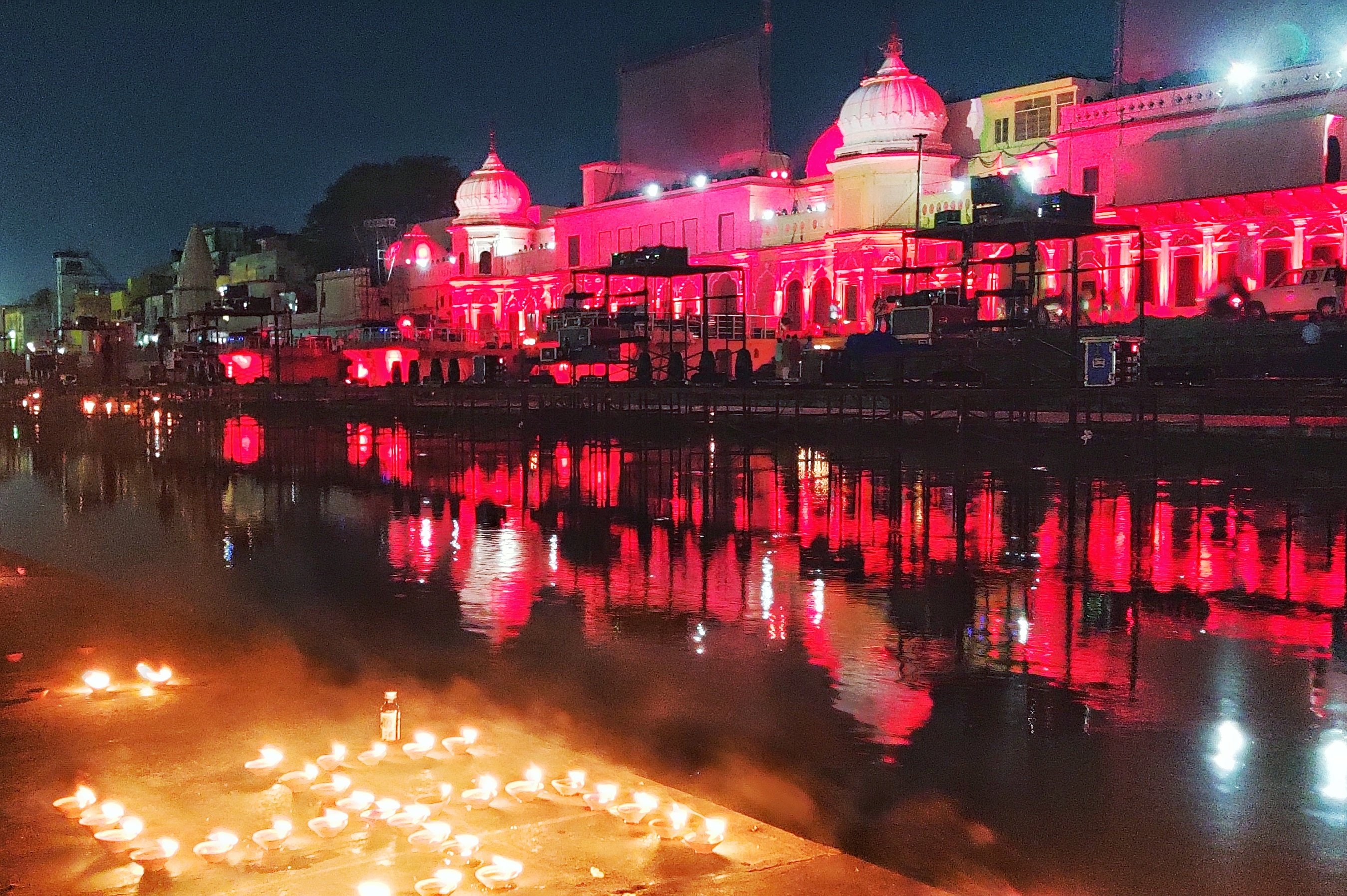
Deepawali being celebrated at Ram ki Paidi ghat on the banks of Saryu river in Ayodhya

Ayodhya has a humid subtropical climate, typical of central India. Summers are long, dry and hot, lasting from late March to mid-June, with average daily temperatures near 32 °C (90 °F). They are followed by the monsoon season which lasts till October, with annual precipitation of approximately 1,067 mm (42.0 in) and average temperatures around 28 °C (82 °F). Winter starts in early November and lasts till the end of January, followed by a short spring in February and early March. Average temperatures are mild, near 16 °C (61 °F), but nights can be colder.

Climate data for Gokarna
Month	Jan	Feb	Mar	Apr	May	Jun	Jul	Aug	Sep	Oct	Nov	Dec	Year
Mean daily maximum °C (°F)	24 (75)	27 (81)	34 (93)	40 (104)	43 (109)	41 (106)	35 (95)	35 (95)	34 (93)	33 (91)	30 (86)	26 (79)	34 (92)
Mean daily minimum °C (°F)	12 (54)	14 (57)	20 (68)	26 (79)	31 (88)	32 (90)	29 (84)	27 (81)	26 (79)	24 (75)	20 (68)	15 (59)	23 (74)
Average precipitation mm (inches)	23 (0.9)	18 (0.7)	11 (0.4)	8 (0.3)	14 (0.6)	113 (4.4)	438 (17.2)	316 (12.4)	219 (8.6)	49 (1.9)	0 (0)	2 (0.1)	1,211 (47.5)
Source: https://weatherandclimate.com/india/uttar-pradesh/ayodhya

== Places of interest ==
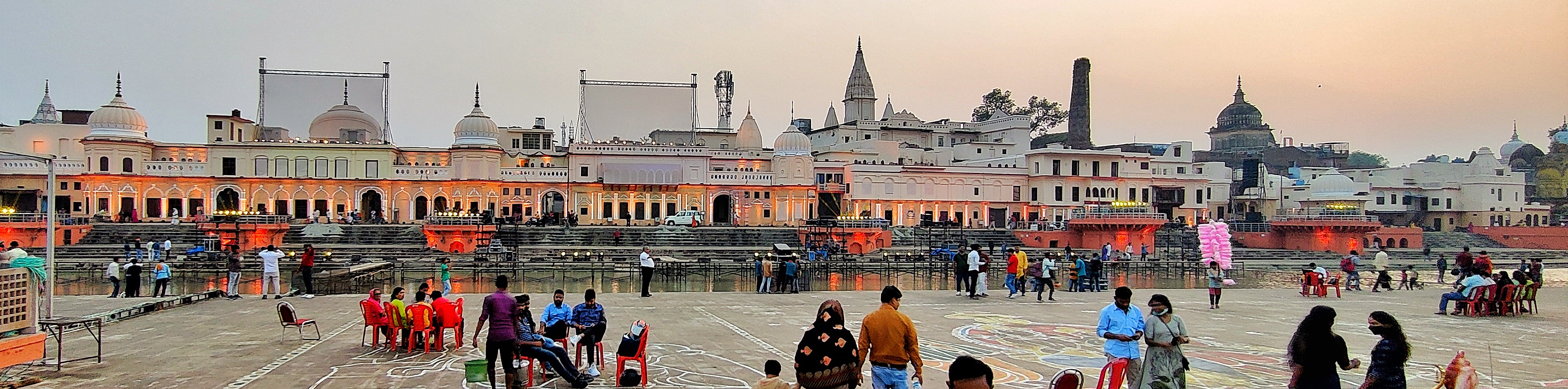
Panoramic view of Ram ki Paidi ghat

Ayodhya is an important place of pilgrimage for the Hindus. A verse in the Brahmanda Purana names Ayodhya among "the most sacred and foremost cities", the others being Mathura, Haridvara, Kashi, Kanchi and Avantika. This verse is also found in the other Puranas with slight variations. In Garuda Purana, Ayodhya is said to be one of seven holiest places for Hindus in India, with Varanasi being the most sacrosanct. In 2023, a Diwali celebration in Ayodhya, broke the Guinness World Record of its previous world record of 1,576,944 for the largest display of oil lamp with 2,223,676 displayed on the eve of Diwali.

=== Ram Mandir ===
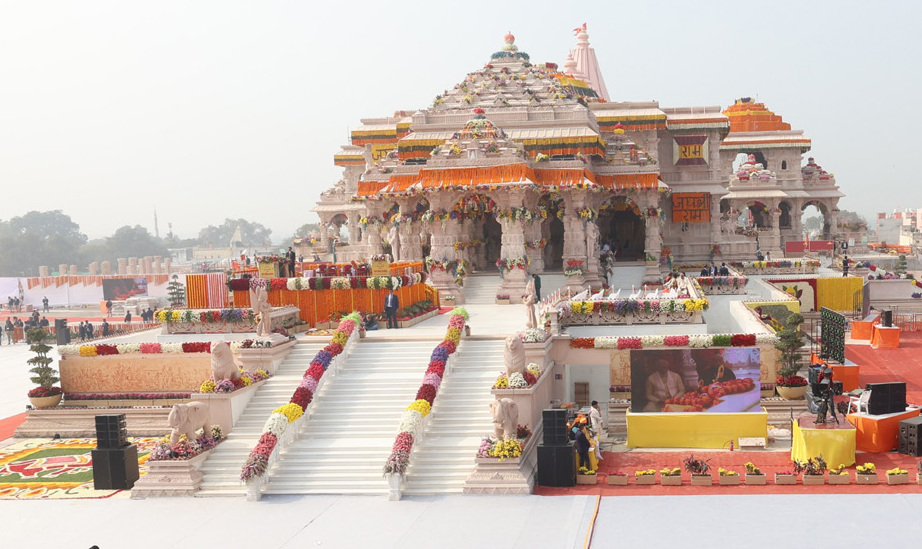
Ram Mandir in Ayodhya is believed to be the birthplace of Rama

Ram Mandir, also known as the Shri Ram Janmabhoomi Mandir, is a Hindu temple complex under construction in Ayodhya. The site is significant to Hindus as it is believed to be the birthplace of their revered deity Rama. Balak Ram or the Infant form of Rama is the presiding deity of the temple consecrated on 22 January 2024.

=== Hanuman Garhi Fort ===
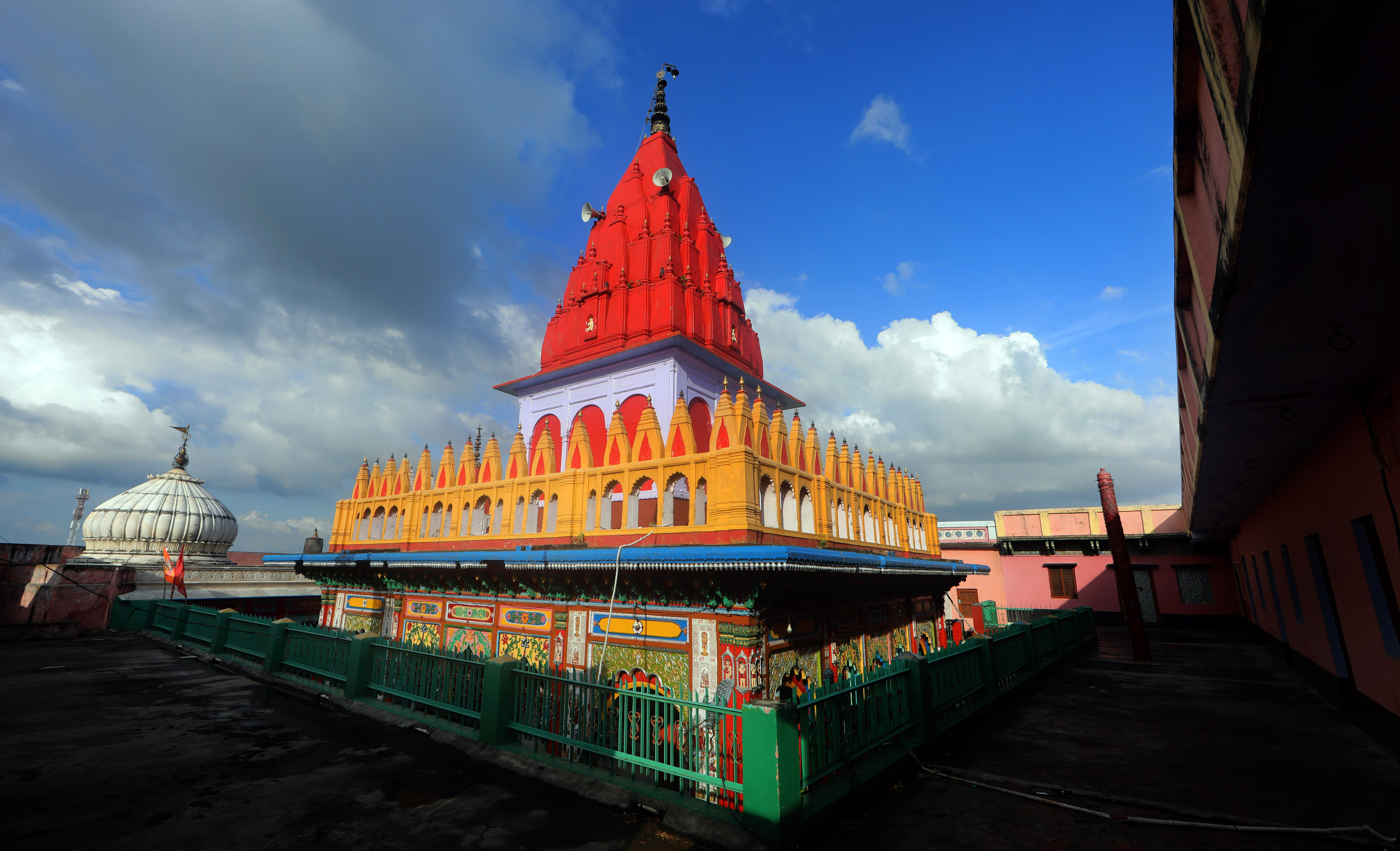
Hanuman Garhi Temple

Hanuman Garhi, a massive four-sided fort with circular bastions at each corner and a temple of Hanuman inside, is the most popular shrine in Ayodhya. Situated in the centre of town, it is approachable by a flight of 76 steps. Its legend is that Hanuman lived here in a cave and guarded the Janambhoomi, or Ramkot. The main temple contains the statue of Maa Anjani with Bal Hanuman seated on her lap. The faithful believe wishes are granted with a visit to the shrine. Kanak Bhawan is a temple said to have been given to Sita and Rama by Rama's stepmother Kaikeyi as a wedding gift, and only contains statues of Sita with her husband.

=== Ramkot ===
Ramkot is the main place of worship in Ayodhya, and the site of the ancient citadel of its namesake, standing on elevated ground in the western city. Although visited by pilgrims throughout the year, it attracts devotees from all over the world on "Ram Navami", the day of the birth of Rama. Ram Navami is celebrated with great pomp in the Hindu month of Chaitra, which falls between March and April. Swarg Dwar is believed to be the site of cremation of Rama. Mani Parbat and Sugriv Parbat are ancient earth mounds, the first identified by a stupa built by the emperor Ashoka, and the second is an ancient monastery. Treta ke Thakur is a temple standing at the site of the Ashvamedha Yajnya of Rama. Three centuries prior, the Raja of Kulu built a new temple here, which was improved by Ahilyabai Holkar of Indore in 1784, the same time the adjacent Ghats were built. The initial idols in black sandstone were recovered from Sarayu and placed in the new temple, which was known as Kaleram-ka-Mandir. Chhoti Devkali Mandir is the temple of goddess Ishani, or Durga, Kuldevi of Sita.

=== Nageshwarnath Temple ===
The temple of Nageshwarnath was established by Kush, son of Rama. Legend has it that Kush lost his armlet while bathing in the Sarayu, and it was retrieved by a Nag-Kanya who fell in love with him. As she was a devotee of Shiva, Kush built her this temple. It was the only temple to survive when Ayodhya was abandoned until the time of Vikramaditya. While the rest of city was in ruin and covered by dense forest, this temple allowed Vikramaditya to recognise the city. The festival of Shivratri is celebrated here with great splendor.

=== Shri Valmiki Ramayana Bhawan ===
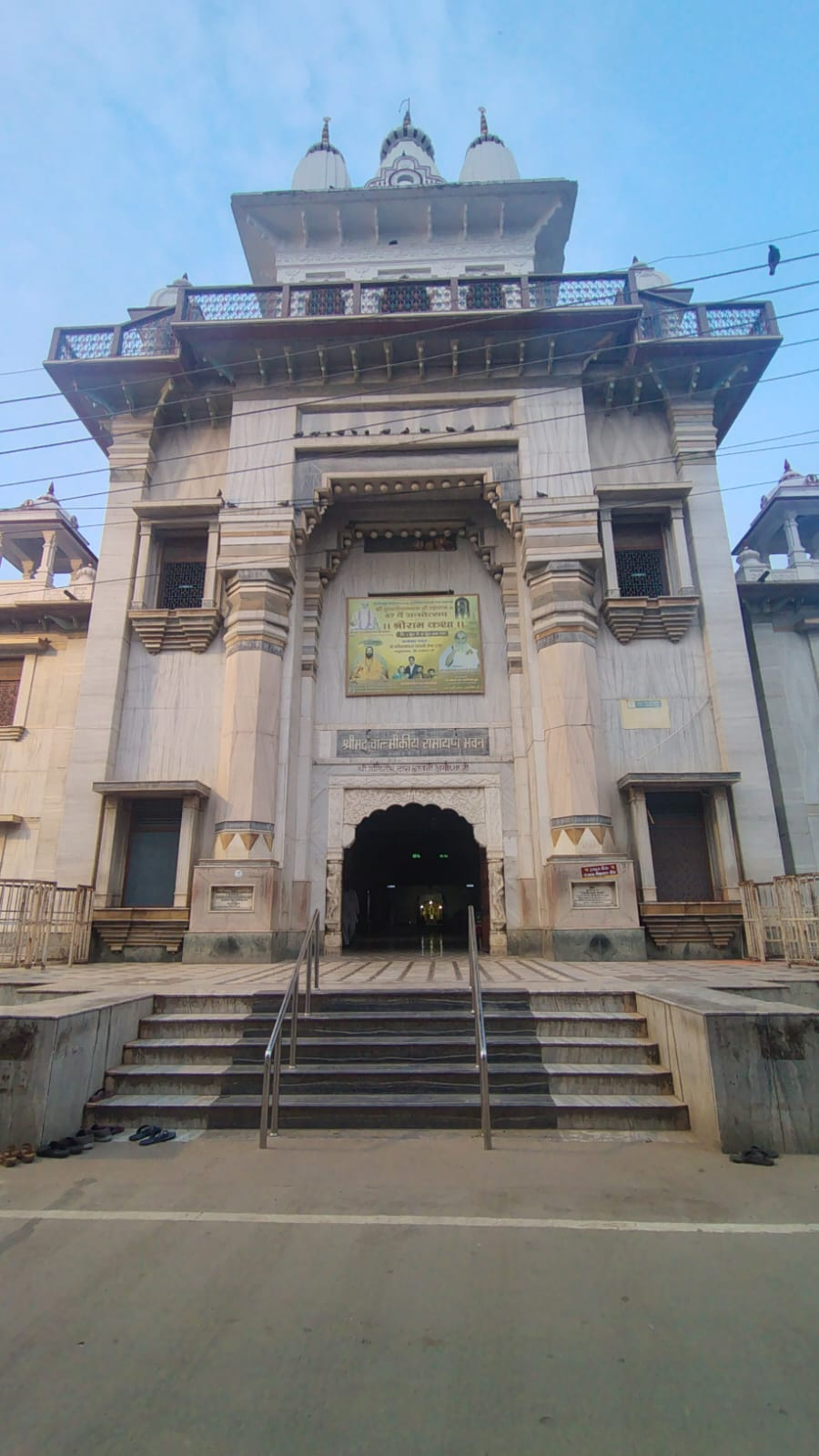
Shri Valmiki Ramayana Bhawan

Shri Valmiki Ramayan Bhawan (श्री वाल्मीकि रामायण भवन) is a prominent religious and cultural site located in Ayodhya, Uttar Pradesh, India. The Bhawan is dedicated to Maharishi Valmiki, the Adi Kavi (first poet) and author of the Ramayana. The complex serves as a center for the recitation, study, and promotion of the Ramayana. Devotees and scholars gather here regularly to read and listen to the epic, keeping alive the spiritual and cultural heritage of Lord Rama’s life and teachings. The architecture of the building reflects traditional North Indian temple style with marble structures and decorative domes.

=== Other places of interest ===
- Brahma Kund
- Ram ki Paidi
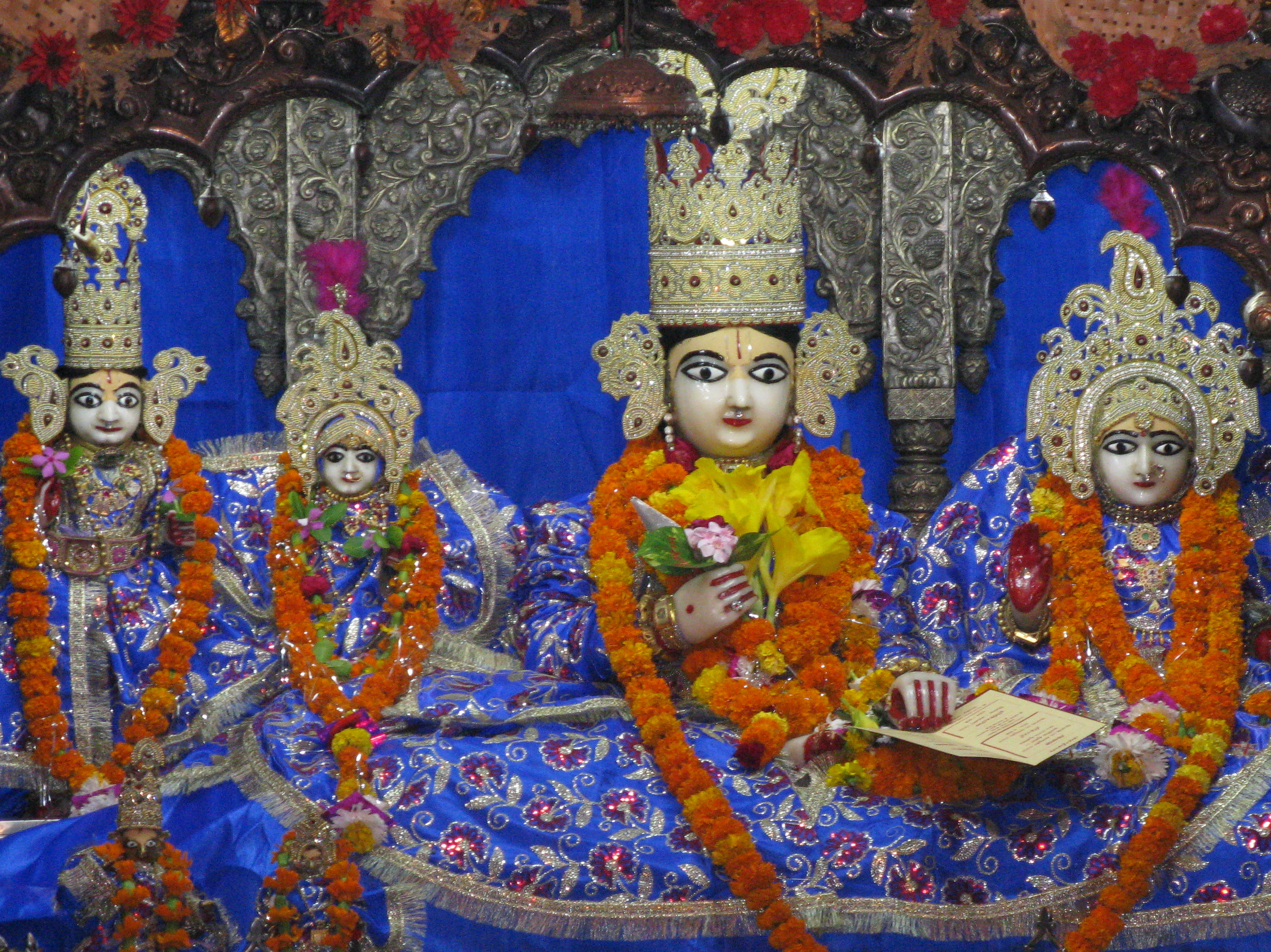
Kanak Bhawan Temple dedicated to Rama and his consort Sita is in the centre of Ayodhya.

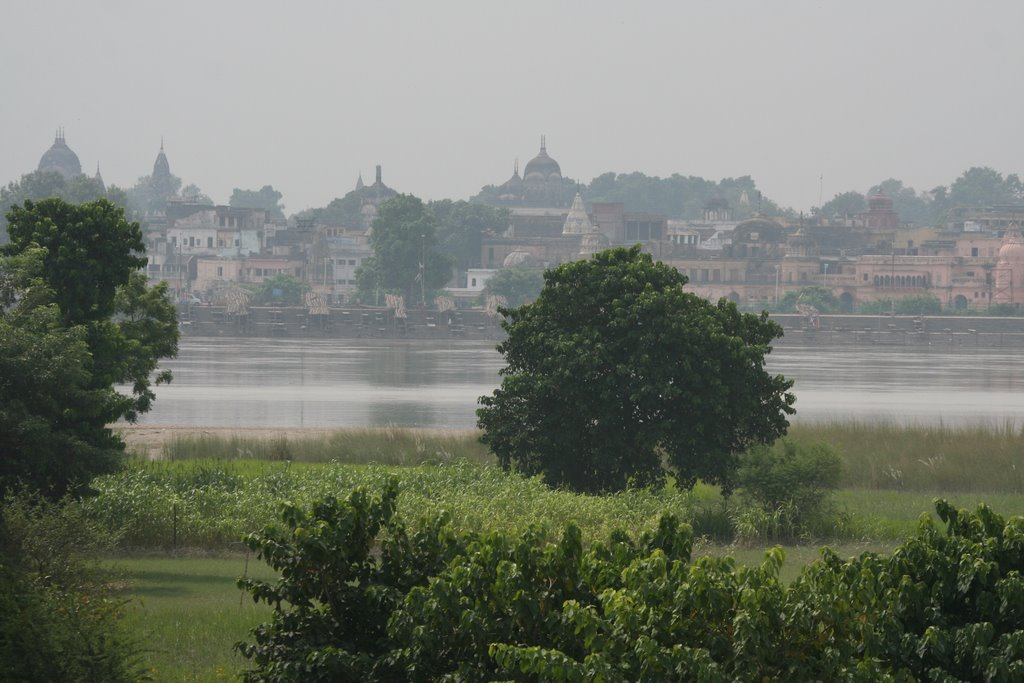
Ayodhya Ghaat on the banks of the Ghaghara river

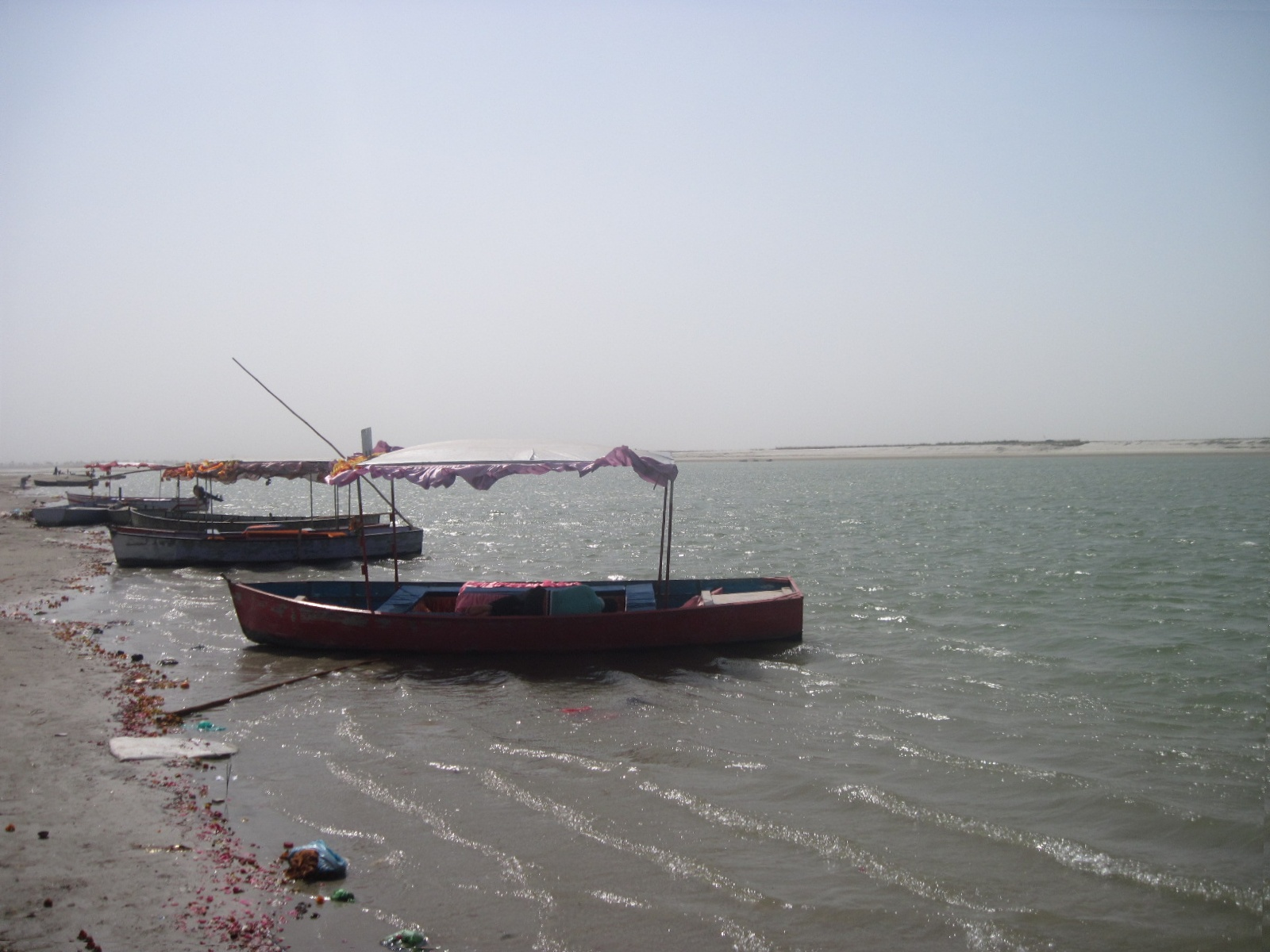
Ghaghra river, locally known as Saryu

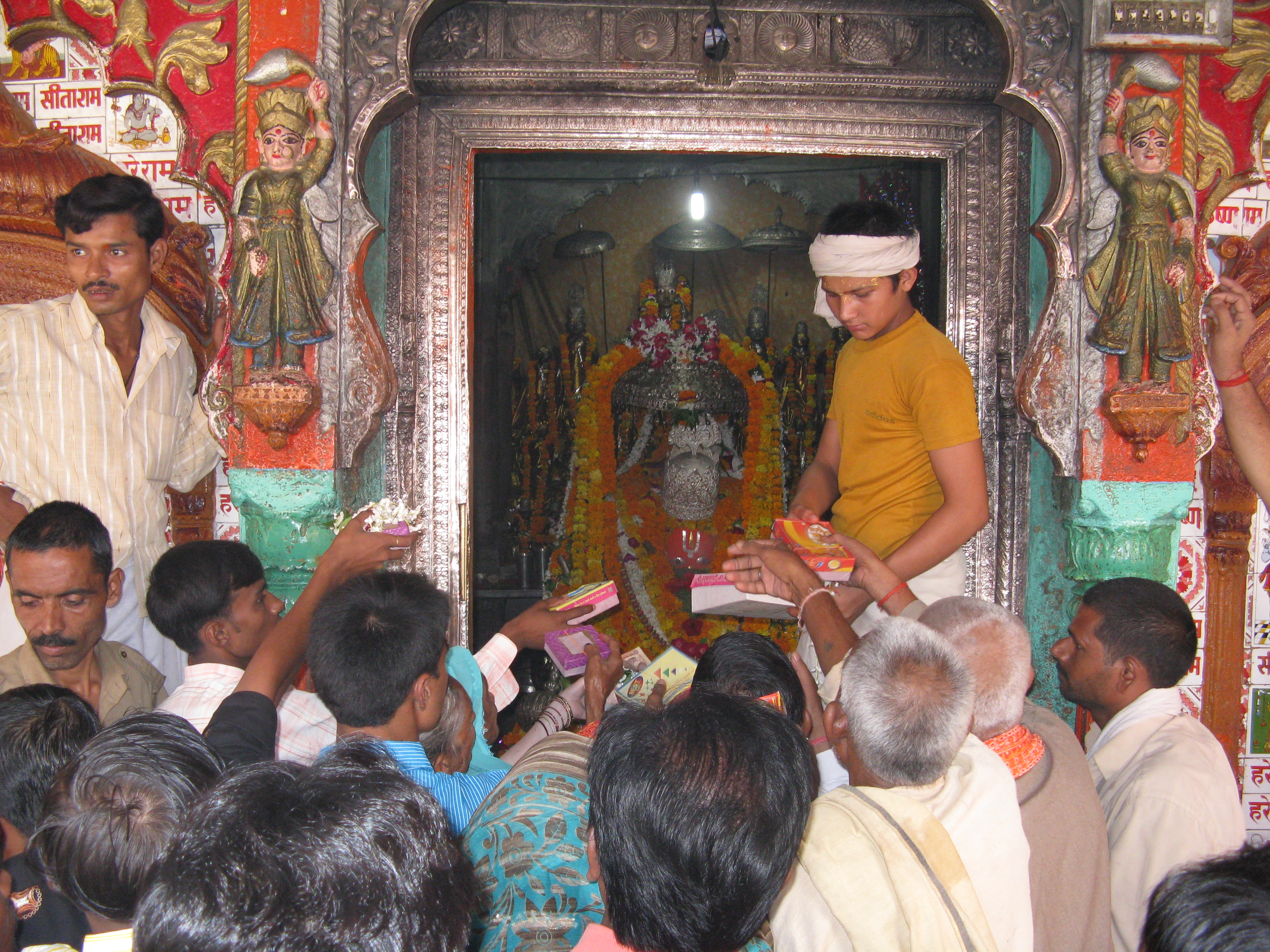
Hanuman Garhi temple

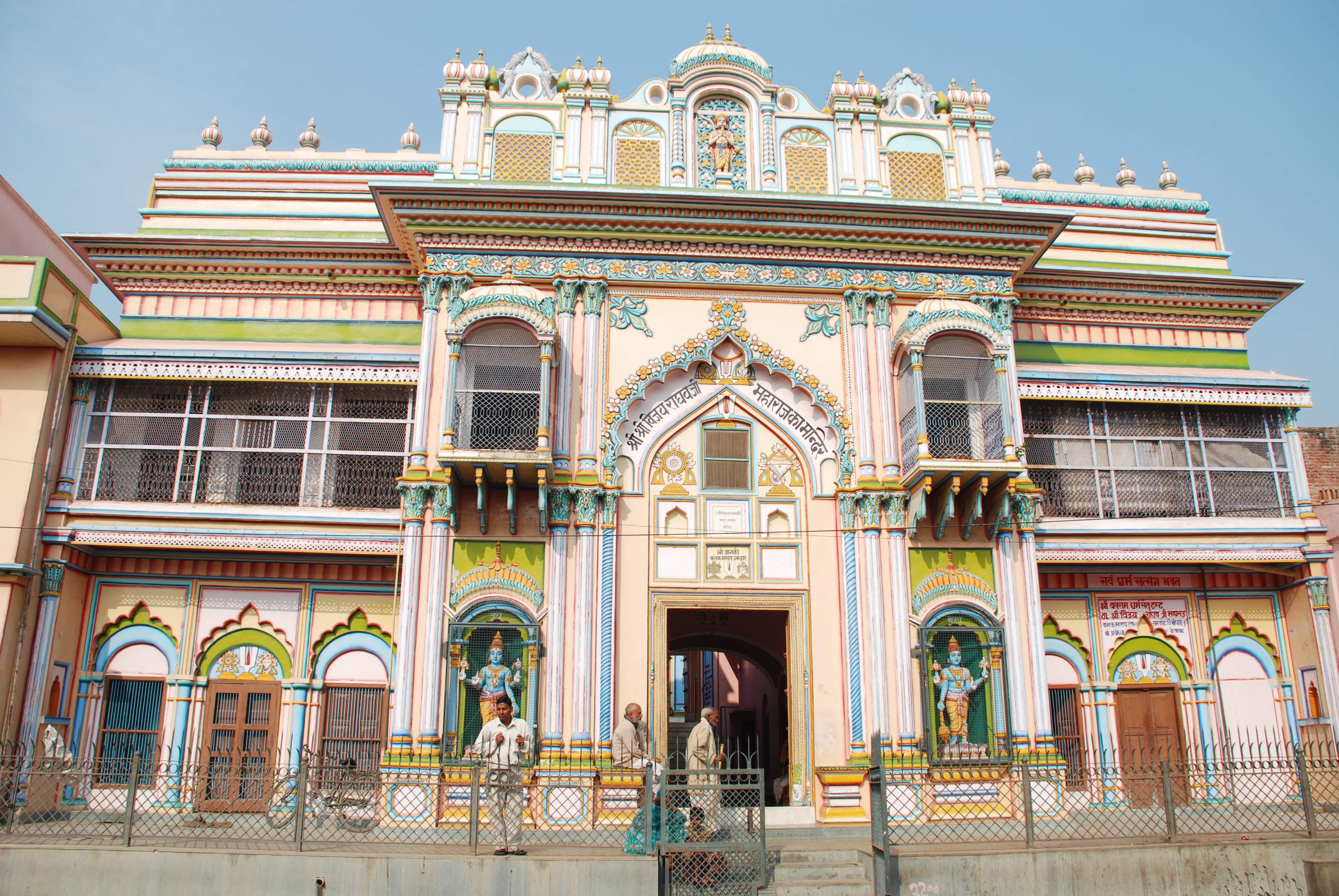
Vijayraghav Mandir

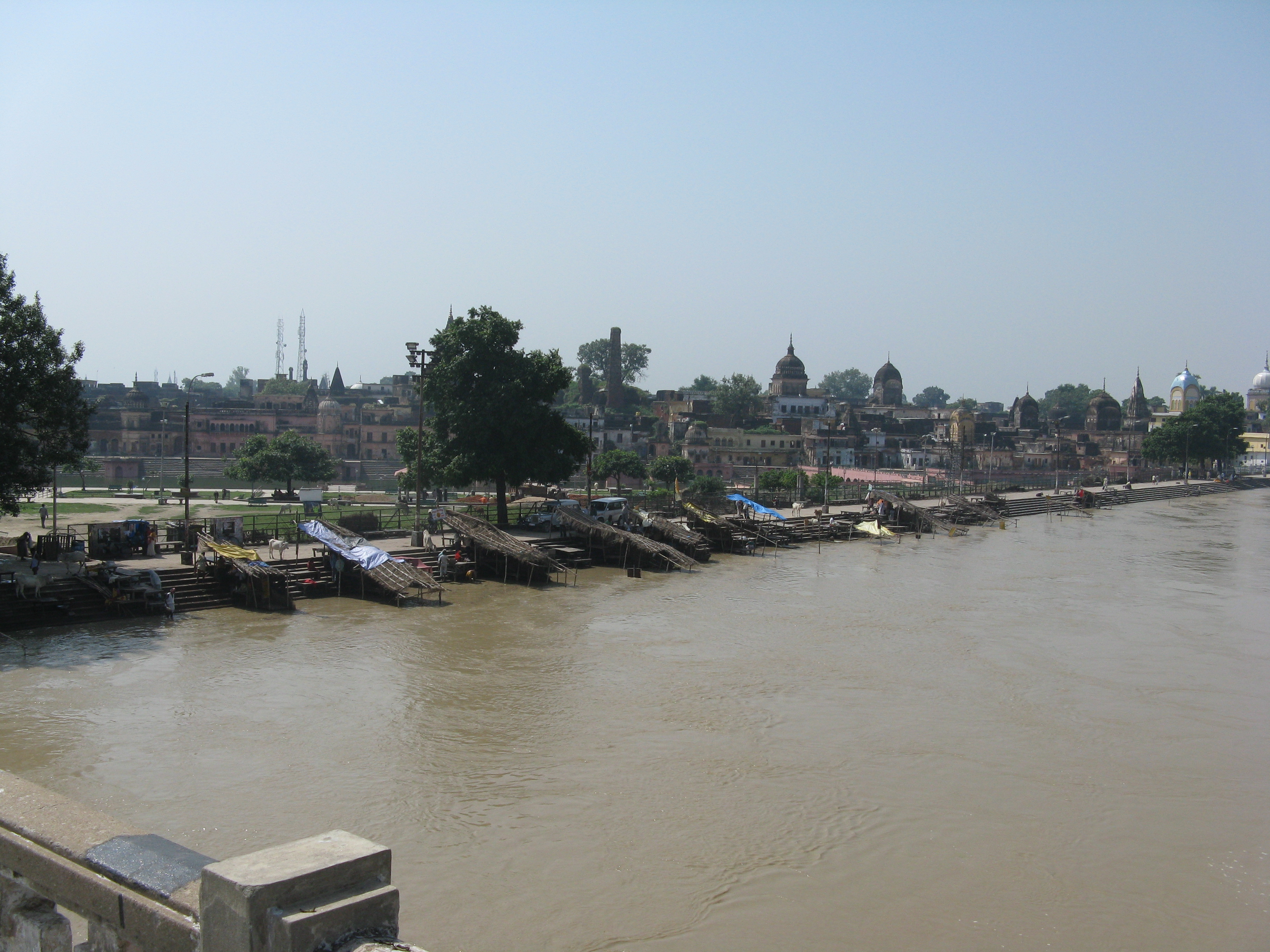
Steps on the banks of the Ghaghara river

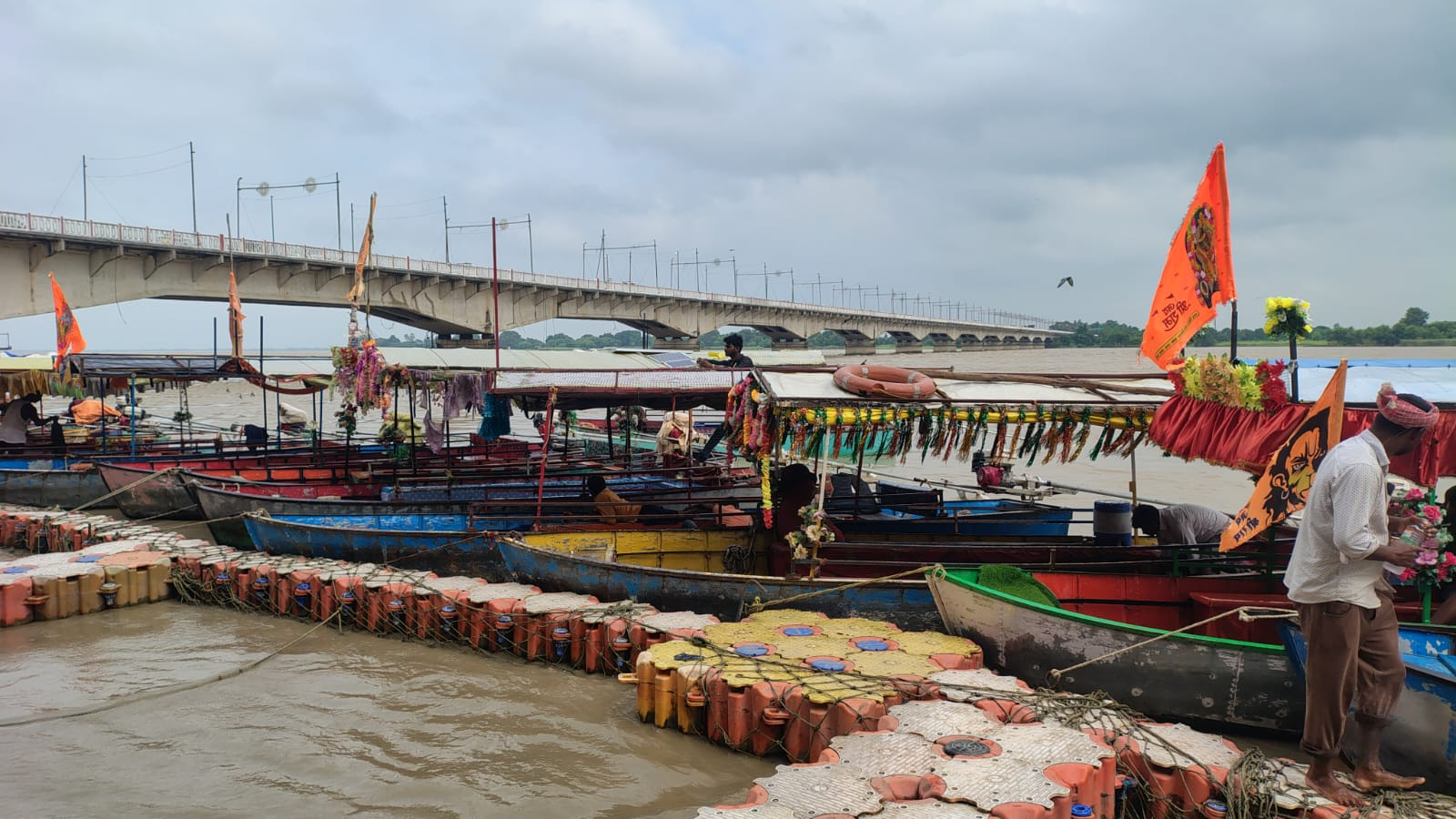
Boats in the Naya ghat on the Ghaghara river

=== Memorial of Heo Hwang-ok ===
The legendary princess Heo Hwang-ok, who married king Suro of Geumgwan Gaya of Korea, is believed by some to be a native of Ayodhya. In 2001, a Memorial of Heo Hwang-ok was inaugurated by a Korean delegation, which included over a hundred historians and government representatives. In 2016, a Korean delegation proposed to develop the memorial. The proposal was accepted by the Uttar Pradesh chief minister Akhilesh Yadav.

== Sister cities ==
- Gimhae, South Korea
  - The mayors of Ayodhya and Gimhae signed a sister city bond in March 2001, based on Ayodhya's identification as the birthplace of the legendary queen Heo Hwang-ok.
- Janakpur, Nepal.
  - Ayodhya and Janakpur became sister cities in November 2014. Ayodhya is the birthplace of Rama and Janakpur is the birthplace of his consort, Sita.

== Transportation ==
=== Road ===
Ayodhya is connected by road to several major cities and towns, including Lucknow (130 km (81 mi)), Gorakhpur (140 km (87 mi)), Prayagraj (160 km (99 mi)), Varanasi (200 km (120 mi)) and Delhi (636 km (395 mi)).

A direct bus service has been started between Ayodhya and Janakpur (birthplace of Sita), in Nepal as a part of Ramayana circuit.

=== Rail ===
The city is on the broad gauge Northern Railway line on Pandit Din Dayal Upadhyay Junction and Lucknow main route with Ayodhya Junction and Faizabad Junction (Ayodhya Cantt) railway stations.

Ramayana Circuit Train : Special Train that runs from Delhi to main sites of the Ramayana Circuit

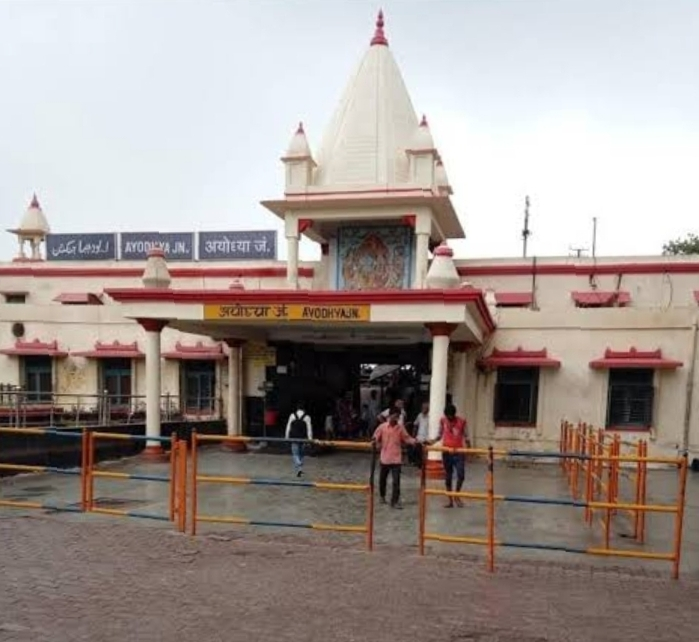
Ayodhya Junction railway station

=== Flight ===
The nearest airports are Ayodhya Airport, 5 km (3.1 mi) away, Chaudhary Charan Singh International Airport in Lucknow, 134 km (83 mi) away, and Prayagraj Airport, 166 km (103 mi) away.

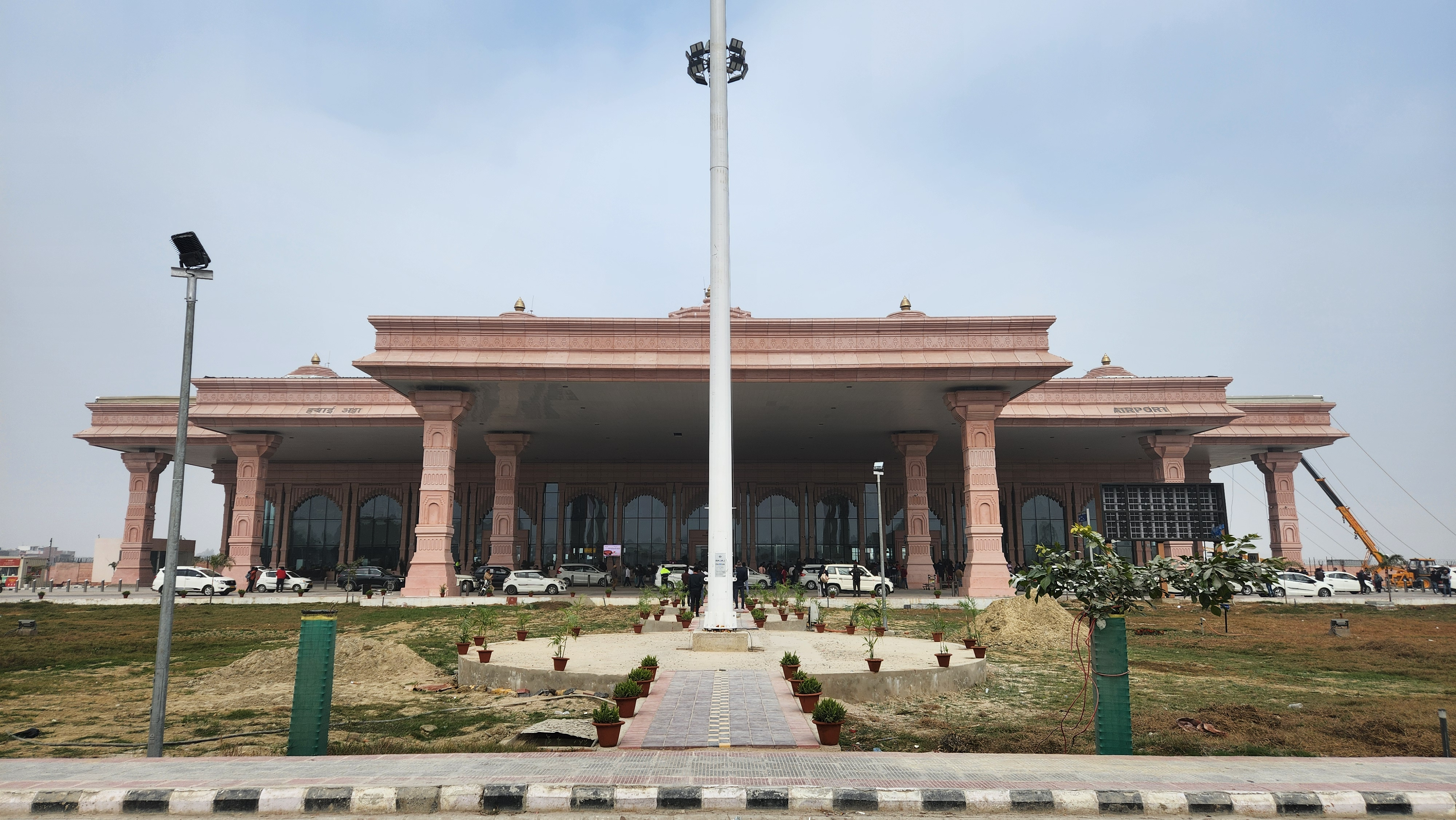
Ayodhya Airport

== See also ==
- Sapta Puri
- Haridwar
- Devashila Yatra
