= Ram Ki Paidi =

Pilgrim spot in Ayodhya

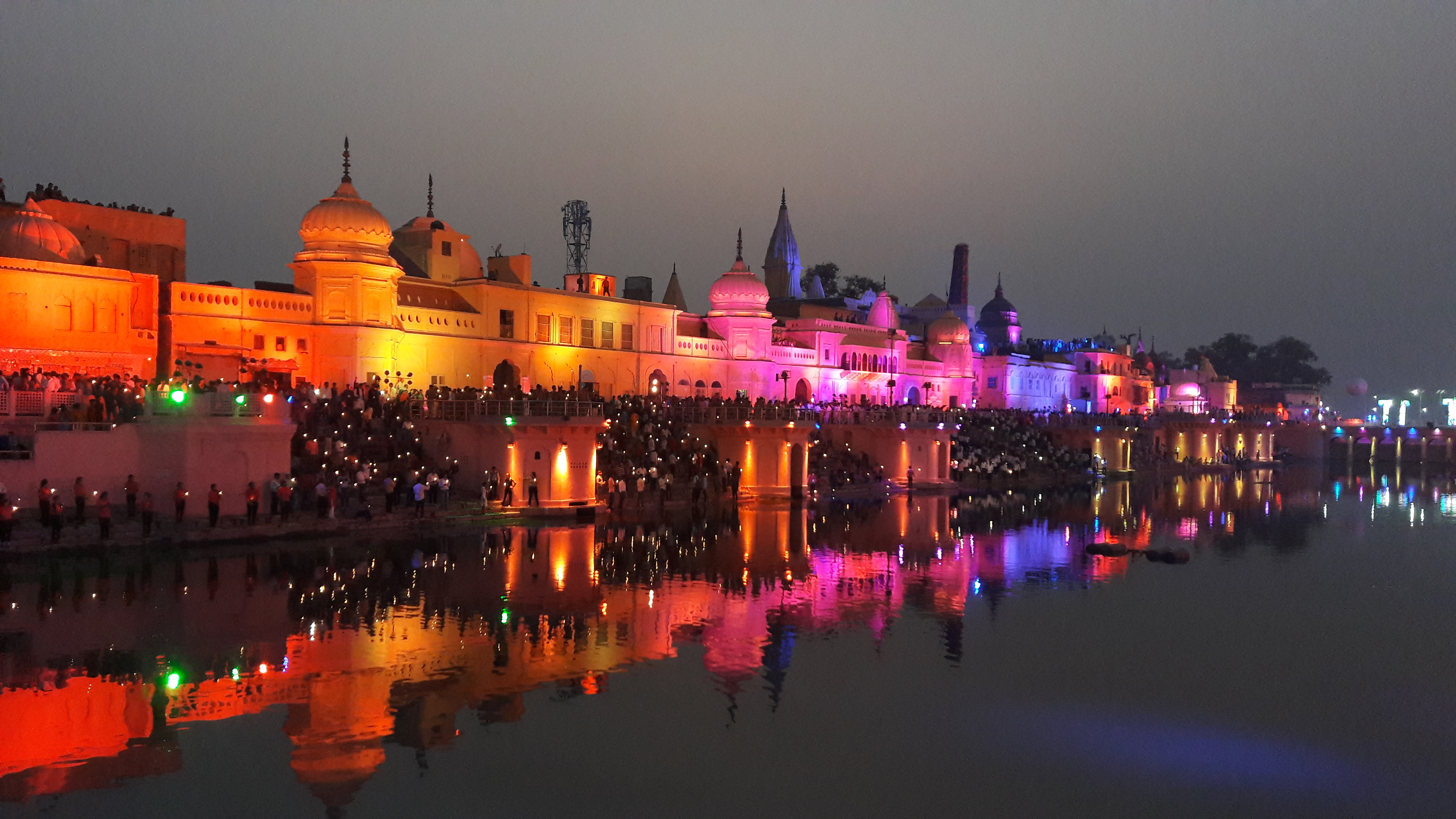
Ram Ki Paidi, as seen at night during Diwali celebrations in Ayodhya. People can be seen lighting diyas on the ghat.

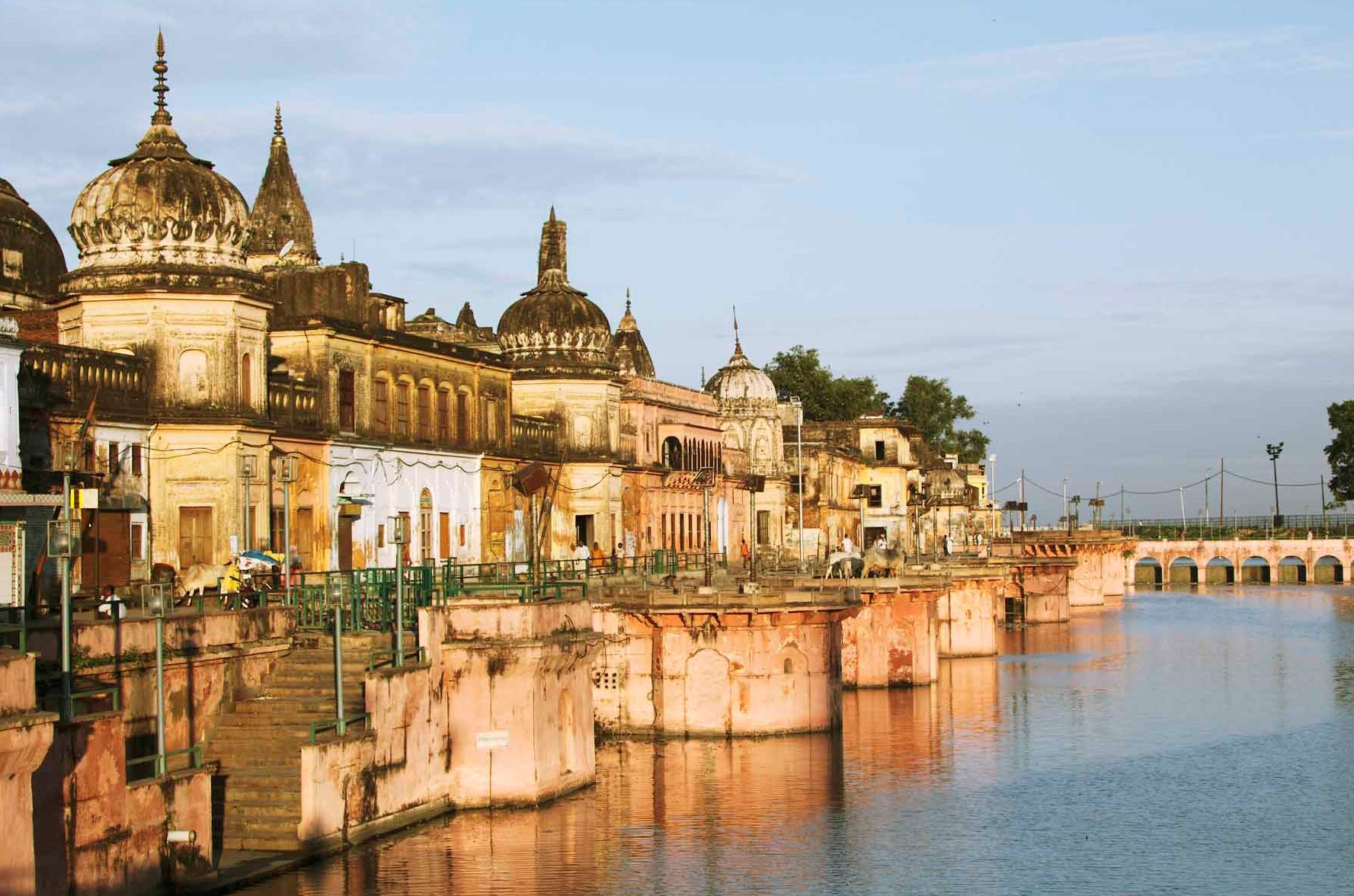
Sarayu Ghat during day time.

Ram Ki Paidi (Hindi: राम की पैड़ी) is a series of ghats on the bank of the Saryu river in Ayodhya, India. A large number of pilgrims visit daily to take a bath in the holy waters.

There were enormous bathing ghats throughout the banks of the Sarayu, and the ones at Nayaghat were immersed in heavy rain and floods. These were rebuilt in 1985.

On Deepawali in October 2019 Ayodhya created a Guinness world record by lighting 450,000 lamps at the Ram Ki Paidi.
