= Kosambi (disambiguation) =

Kosambi is an old city and Buddhist pilgrimage site in India.

Kosambi may also refer to:

- Kosambi, Tangerang, a subdistrict of Tangerang Regency, Banten, Indonesia
- Damodar Dharmananda Kosambi (1907–1966), Indian polymath
- Dharmananda Damodar Kosambi (1876–1947), Indian Buddhist and Pali language scholar
- Duri Kosambi, Cengkareng, an administrative village (kelurahan) of Cengkareng, West Jakarta, Indonesia

== See also ==
- Kaushambi (disambiguation)
