= Kanak Bhawan =

Temple in Ayodhya, India

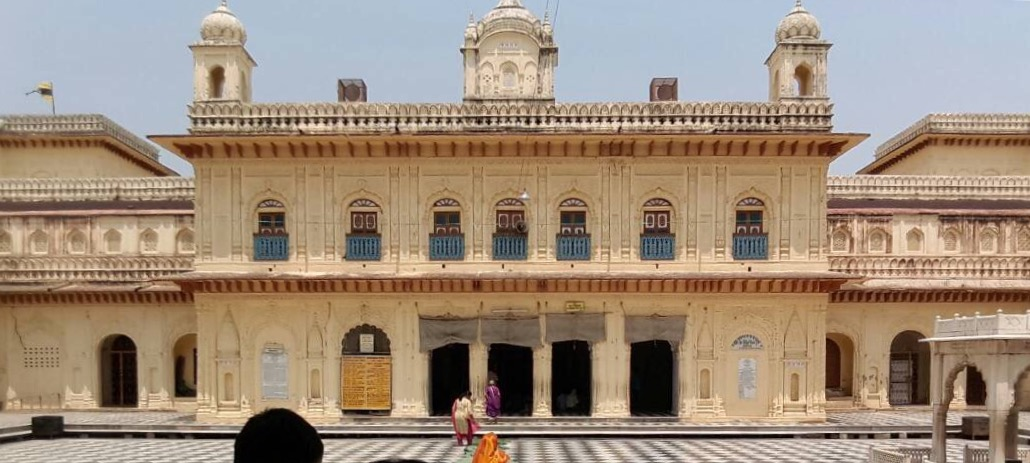
- Kanak Bhawan Mandir, Ayodhya

- Location within Uttar Pradesh Location within India

Religion
- Affiliation: Hinduism
- Deity: Rama and Sita
- Festivals: Ram Navami, Janaki Navami
- Governing body: Shri Ram Janmabhoomi Teerth Kshetra

Location
- Location: Ram Janmabhoomi, Ayodhya
- State: Uttar Pradesh
- Country: India
- Coordinates: 26.798451658752814°N 82.19929949532217°E

Website
- https://srjbtkshetra.org/

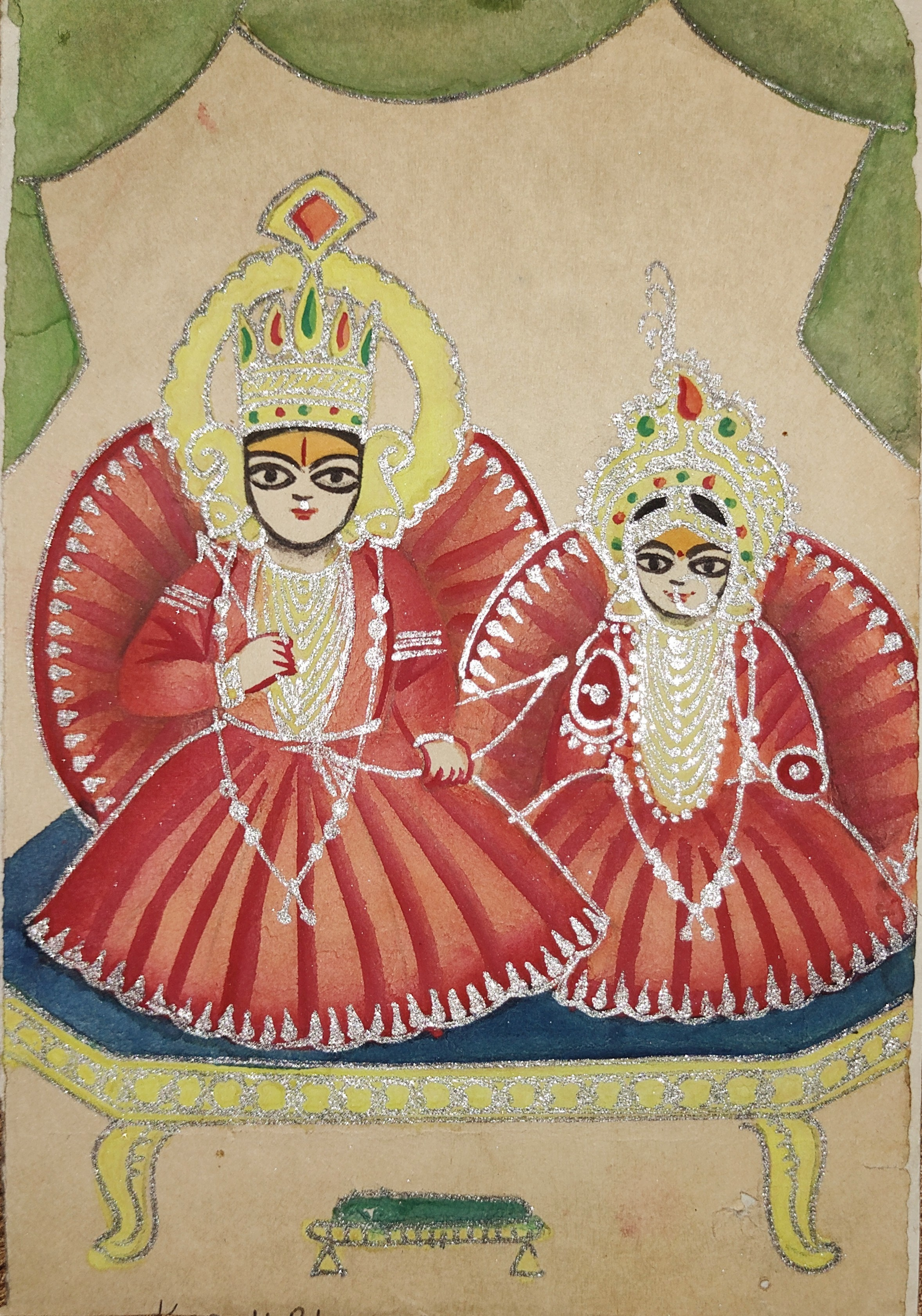
Kanak Bihari of Ayodhya, Painting

Kanak Bhawan (lit. 'Golden Palace') is a temple in Ram Janmabhoomi, Ayodhya, which is in the north-east of Ramkot. It is one of the most famous temples of Ayodhya. It is believed that this palace (temple) was gifted by Kaikeyi, immediately after the marriage of Rama with Sita and hence, it is their personal palace. According to the mythology, after the original Kanak Bhawan was damaged, it was rebuilt by Krishna himself in the Dvapar Yuga. It is believed that it was renovated by Vikramaditya in the medieval period. Later, it was renovated by Queen Vrishabhanu Kunwari which is still present today. The main idols installed in the sanctum sanctorum are of Rama and Sita.

== History ==
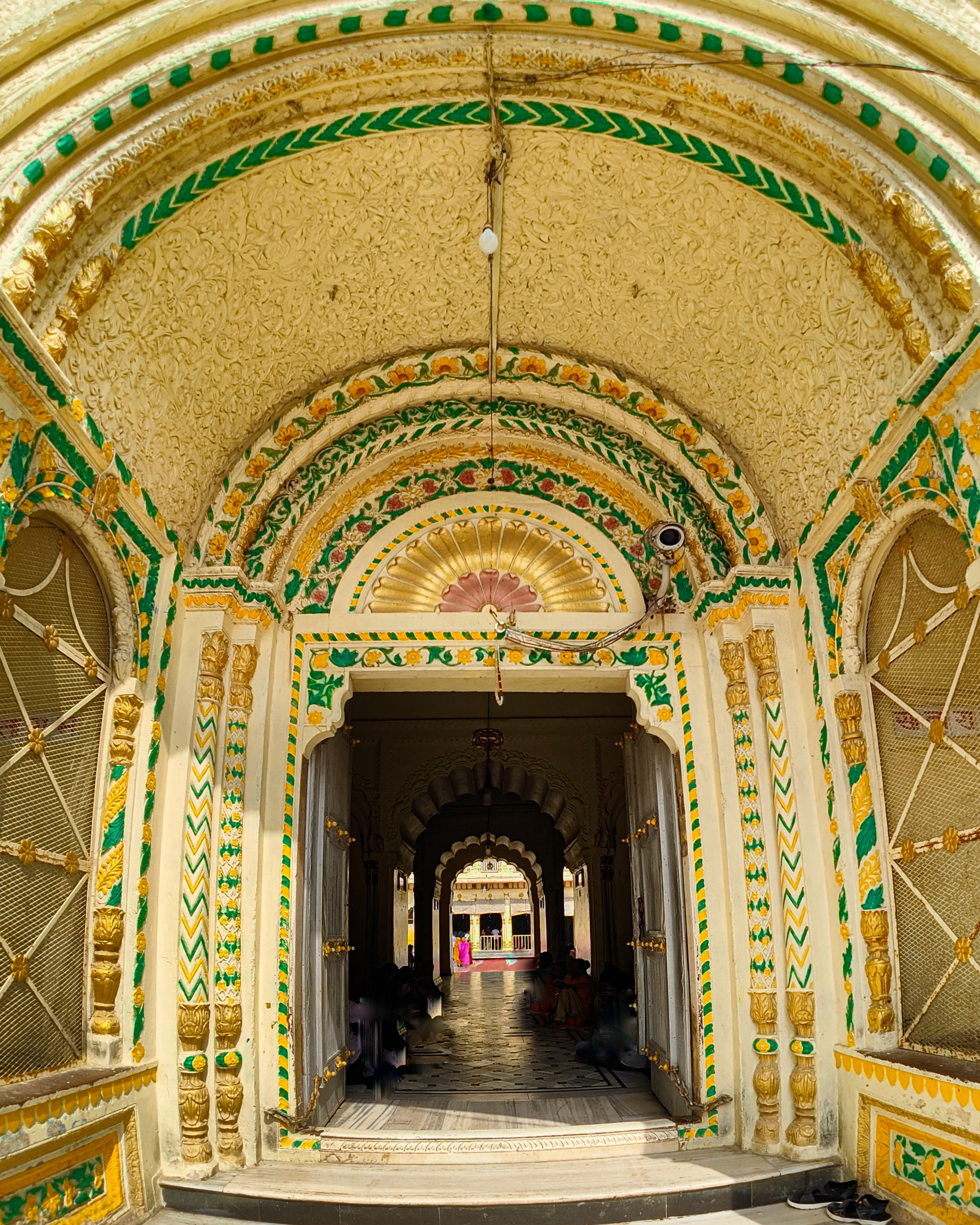
Entrance and corridor of Kanak Bhawan.

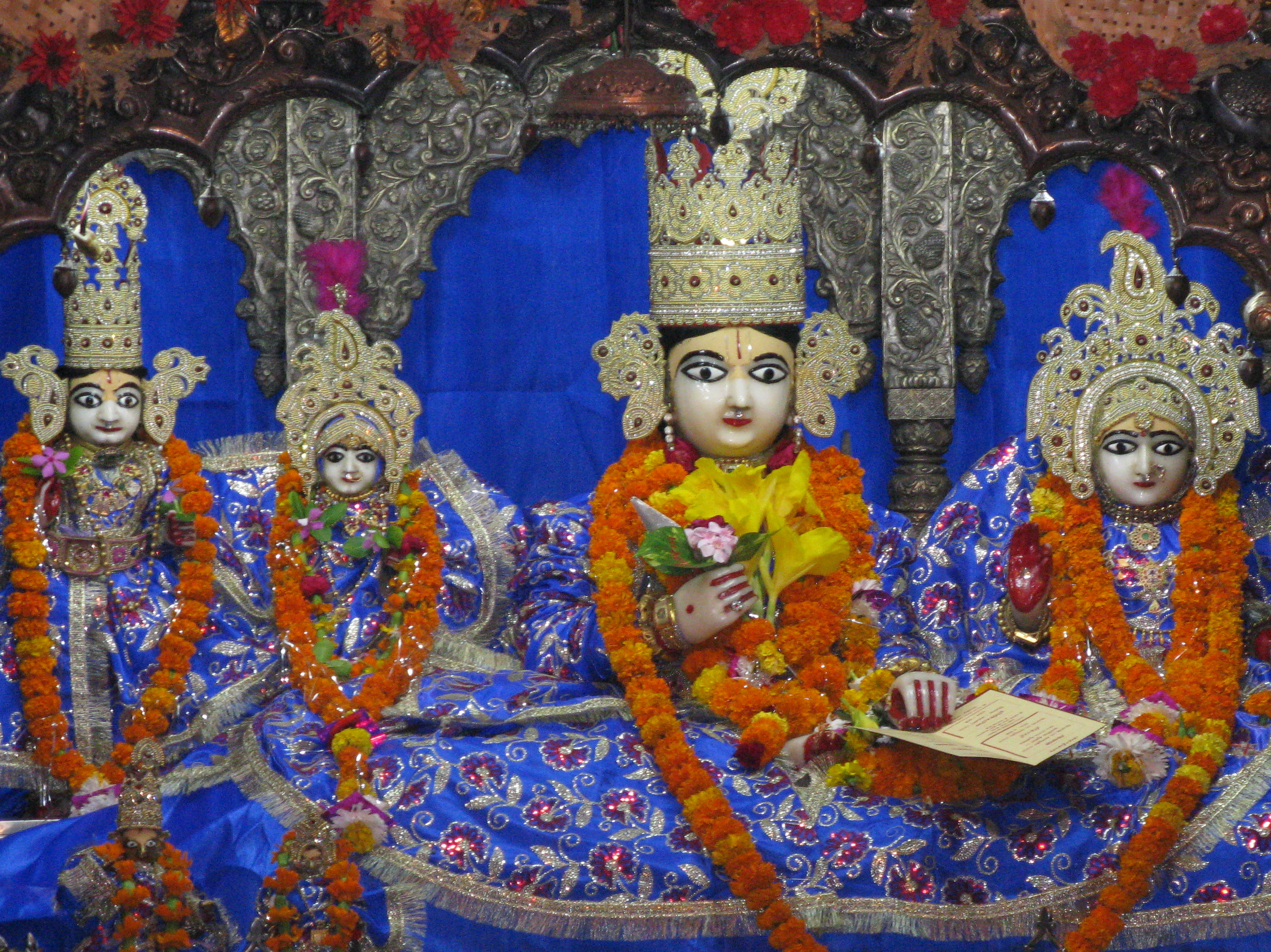
Idols of Rama and Sita in Kanak Bhawan, Ayodhya.

The temple was designed as a huge palace. The architecture of this temple resembles the palaces of Rajasthan and Bundelkhand. The history basically goes back to Treta Yuga when it was given by Rama's step-mother Kaikeyi to his wife Sita as a gift over marriage. Over the time, it became dilapidated and was even completely destroyed. It is rebuilt and renovated several times throughout its history. The first re-construction was done by Rama's son Kush in the early period of Dvapara Yuga. After this, it was rebuilt by King Rishabh Dev (Tirthankara) in the middle of Dvapara Yuga and Shri Krishna is also believed to have visited this ancient place in the pre-Kali Yuga period (about 614 BC).

In the present era, it was first built by Chandragupta-II of the Gupta empire in the Yudhishthira period in 2431 BC. After that, it was done by Samudragupta in 387 AD. The temple was destroyed by Nawab Salarjung-II Ghazi in 1027 AD and was renovated by Bundela Rajput Maharaj of Orchha and Tikamgarh of Bundelkhand, Maharaj Mahendra Pratap Singh and his wife Maharani Vrishabhan Kunwari in 1891. This construction was completed on the Shaishthi of Vaishakh Shukla of Guru Paush.

There are three pairs of idols here and all three are of Rama and Sita. The largest statue was installed by Maharani Vrishabhan Kunwari. It is believed that she was the main person behind the re-construction and establishment of the temple. A statue of somewhat lower height is installed on the right side of this pair by King Vikramaditya. This idol was kept safe by him when this ancient temple was attacked. The third and the smallest pair is said to have been gifted by Shri Krishna to a female devotee who was worshiping Rama at this place.

Shri Krishna instructed the woman to bury these idols with her after her demised because this place would be later marked as holy place and a great king will build a huge temple at this place in Kali Yuga. Later, when Maharaj Vikramaditya led the foundation of this temple and excavated the base, he found these ancient idols.

At the time of construction of present temple, all three pairs were enshrined in the sanctum sanctorum. Now, all three pairs can be seen.

== Transport ==
=== Airways ===
The nearest airport is 11 kilometers away from the newly build Ram Mandir, Ayodhya. Faizabad-Gorakhpur airport is 158 km approx. Prayagraj airport is 172 km approx. and Varanasi's Lal Bahadur Shastri airport is 224 km away approx.

=== Railway ===
Railway stations are well-connected. By Faizabad railway, it is 128 km from Lucknow, 171 km from Gorakhpur, 157 km from Prayagraj, 196 km from Varanasi whereas by Ayodhya Railway, it is 135 km from Lucknow, 164 km from both Gorakhpur and Prayagraj and 189 km from Varanasi.

=== Road ===
Uttar Pradesh State Road Transport Corporation's bus services are available for several hours and it is easy to get here from remote area also. It is 152 km from Lucknow, 158 km from Gorakhpur, 172 km from Allahabad and 224 km from Varanasi.
