= Kaushambi =

Kaushambi may refer to:

- Kosambi, an ancient city of India; Kosambi is a Pali language name; the original Sanskrit name of the city was Kaushambi
- Kaushambi district, a district in Uttar Pradesh, India
  - Kaushambi (Lok Sabha constituency)
- Kaushambi (Ghaziabad), a neighbourhood of Ghaziabad city in Uttar Pradesh, India
  - Kaushambi metro station, of the Delhi Metro
- Kaushambi Bhatt, Indian actress

== See also ==
- Kosambi (disambiguation)
- Kushambha, mythical founder of the Indian city
